= List of Hyacinthaceae of South Africa =

List of flowering plants in the family Hyacinthaceae recorded from South Africa

Hyacinthaceae is a family of bulbous monocotyledenous flowering plants (anthophytes) in the order Asparagales. Named after the genus Hyacinthus, Hyacinthaceae include many garden plants and are distributed mostly in Mediterranean climates, including South Africa, Central Asia and South America. Their flowers have six tepals and six stamens with a superior ovary, which previously placed them within the lily family (Liliaceae), and their leaves are fleshy, mucilaginous, and arranged in a basal rosette.

23,420 species of vascular plant have been recorded in South Africa, making it the sixth most species-rich country in the world and the most species-rich country on the African continent. Of these, 153 species are considered to be threatened. Nine biomes have been described in South Africa: Fynbos, Succulent Karoo, desert, Nama Karoo, grassland, savanna, Albany thickets, the Indian Ocean coastal belt, and forests.

The 2018 South African National Biodiversity Institute's National Biodiversity Assessment plant checklist lists 35,130 taxa in the phyla Anthocerotophyta (hornworts (6)), Anthophyta (flowering plants (33534)), Bryophyta (mosses (685)), Cycadophyta (cycads (42)), Lycopodiophyta (Lycophytes(45)), Marchantiophyta (liverworts (376)), Pinophyta (conifers (33)), and Pteridophyta (cryptogams (408)).

43 genera are represented in the literature. Listed taxa include species, subspecies, varieties, and forms as recorded, some of which have subsequently been allocated to other taxa as synonyms, in which cases the accepted taxon is appended to the listing. Multiple entries under alternative names reflect taxonomic revision over time.

== Albuca ==
Genus Albuca:

- Albuca abyssinica Jacq. indigenous
- Albuca acuminata Baker, indigenous
- Albuca affinis Baker, indigenous
- Albuca albucoides (Aiton) J.C.Manning & Goldblatt, endemic
- Albuca altissima Dryand. accepted as Albuca canadensis (L.) F.M.Leight.
- Albuca angolensis Welw. ex Baker, accepted as Ornithogalum abyssinicum (Jacq.) J.C.Manning & Goldblatt
- Albuca anisocrispa Mart.-Azorin & M.B.Crespo, endemic
- Albuca annulata Mart.-Azorin & M.B.Crespo, endemic
- Albuca arenosa J.C.Manning & Goldblatt, endemic
- Albuca aspera U.Mull.-Doblies, accepted as Albuca viscosa L.f.
- Albuca aurea Jacq. indigenous
- Albuca autumnula (U.Mull.-Doblies & D.Mull.-Doblies) J.C.Manning & Goldblatt, endemic
- Albuca bakeri Mart.-Azorin & M.B.Crespo, endemic
- Albuca barbata (Jacq.) J.C.Manning & Goldblatt, indigenous
- Albuca batteniana Hilliard & B.L.Burtt, indigenous
- Albuca baurii Baker, indigenous
- Albuca bifolia Baker, endemic
- Albuca bifoliata R.A.Dyer, indigenous
- Albuca bontebokensis U.Mull.-Doblies, accepted as Albuca viscosa L.f.
- Albuca boucheri U.Mull.-Doblies, endemic
- Albuca bracteata (Thunb.) J.C.Manning & Goldblatt, indigenous
- Albuca brevipes Baker, accepted as Albuca suaveolens (Jacq.) J.C.Manning & Goldblatt
- Albuca bruce-bayeri U.Mull.-Doblies, accepted as Albuca hallii U.Mull.-Doblies
- Albuca buffelspoortensis Van Jaarsv. endemic
- Albuca canadensis (L.) F.M.Leight. indigenous
- Albuca caudata Jacq., endemic
- Albuca chartacea (Mart.-Azorin, M.B.Crespo & A.P.Dold) J.C.Manning & Goldblatt, endemic
- Albuca ciliaris U.Mull.-Doblies indigenous
- Albuca circinata Baker, accepted as Albuca namaquensis Baker
- Albuca clanwilliamaegloria U.Mull.-Doblies, indigenous
- Albuca collina Baker indigenous
- Albuca concordiana Baker indigenous
- Albuca consanguinea (Kunth) J.C.Manning & Goldblatt, endemic
- Albuca cooperi Baker indigenous
- Albuca corymbosa Baker, indigenous
- Albuca craibii (Mart.-Azorin, M.B.Crespo & A.P.Dold) J.C.Manning & Goldblatt, endemic
- Albuca cremnophila Van Jaarsv. & A.E.van Wyk, endemic
- Albuca crinifolia Baker, indigenous
- Albuca crispa J.C.Manning & Goldblatt, endemic
- Albuca crudenii Archibald, endemic
- Albuca dalyae Baker, indigenous
- Albuca darlingana U.Mull.-Doblies, endemic
- Albuca deaconii Van Jaarsv. indigenous
- Albuca decipiens U.Mull.-Doblies, indigenous
- Albuca deserticola J.C.Manning & Goldblatt, indigenous
  - Albuca deserticola J.C.Manning & Goldblatt subsp. deserticola, indigenous
- Albuca dilucula (Oberm.) J.C.Manning & Goldblatt, endemic
- Albuca dyeri (Poelln.) J.C.Manning & Goldblatt, indigenous
- Albuca echinosperma U.Mull.-Doblies, indigenous
- Albuca etesiogaripensis U.Mull.-Doblies, indigenous
- Albuca exigua (Mart.-Azorin, M.B.Crespo, A.P.Dold, M.Pinter & Wetschnig) J.C.Manning, endemic
- Albuca exuviata Baker, indigenous
- Albuca fastigiata Dryand. endemic
  - Albuca fastigiata Dryand. var. fastigiata, indigenous
- Albuca flaccida Jacq. indigenous
- Albuca foetida U.Mull.-Doblies, indigenous
- Albuca fragrans Jacq. indigenous
- Albuca gariepensis J.C.Manning & Goldblatt, endemic
- Albuca gethylloides (U.Mull.-Doblies & D.Mull.-Doblies) J.C.Manning & Goldblatt, endemic
- Albuca gildenhuysii (Van Jaarsv.) Van Jaarsv. endemic
- Albuca glandulifera J.C.Manning & Goldblatt, indigenous
- Albuca glandulosa Baker, indigenous
- Albuca glauca Baker, indigenous
- Albuca glaucifolia (U.Mull.-Doblies & D.Mull.-Doblies) J.C.Manning & Goldblatt, endemic
- Albuca goswinii U.Mull.-Doblies, indigenous
- Albuca grandis J.C.Manning & Goldblatt, endemic
- Albuca granulata Baker, accepted as Albuca shawii Baker
- Albuca hallii U.Mull.-Doblies, indigenous
- Albuca hesquaspoortensis U.Mull.-Doblies, indigenous
- Albuca humilis Baker, indigenous
- Albuca imbricata F.M.Leight. accepted as Albuca juncifolia Baker
- Albuca jacquinii U.Mull.-Doblies, accepted as Albuca viscosa L.f.
- Albuca juncifolia Baker, indigenous
- Albuca juncifolia Baker subsp. xanthocodon (Hilliard & B.L.Burtt) U.Mull.-Doblies, accepted as Albuca xanthocodon Hilliard & B.L.Burtt, indigenous
- Albuca karachabpoortensis (U.Mull.-Doblies & D.Mull.-Doblies) J.C.Manning & Goldblatt, endemic
- Albuca karooica U.Mull.-Doblies, accepted as Albuca cooperi Baker
- Albuca kirstenii (J.C.Manning & Goldblatt) J.C.Manning & Goldblatt, endemic
- Albuca knersvlaktensis (U.Mull.-Doblies & D.Mull.-Doblies) J.C.Manning & Goldblatt, endemic
- Albuca leucantha U.Mull.-Doblies, indigenous
- Albuca littoralis (N.R.Crouch, D.Styles, A.J.Beaumont & Mart.-Azorin) J.C.Manning, endemic
- Albuca longifolia Baker, indigenous
- Albuca longipes Baker, indigenous
- Albuca macowanii Baker, indigenous
- Albuca massonii Baker, indigenous
- Albuca mater-familias U.Mull.-Doblies, accepted as Albuca flaccida Jacq.
- Albuca maxima Burm.f., accepted as Albuca canadensis (L.) F.M.Leight.
- Albuca melleri (Baker) Baker, accepted as Ornithogalum abyssinicum (Jacq.) J.C.Manning & Goldblatt
- Albuca monarchos (U.Mull.-Doblies & D.Mull.-Doblies) J.C.Manning & Goldblatt, endemic
- Albuca namaquensis Baker, indigenous
- Albuca nana Schonland, indigenous
- Albuca nathoana (U.Mull.-Doblies & D.Mull.-Doblies) J.C.Manning & Goldblatt, endemic
- Albuca navicula U.Mull.-Doblies, indigenous
- Albuca nelsonii N.E.Br. indigenous
- Albuca obtusa J.C.Manning & Goldblatt, indigenous
- Albuca osmynella (U.Mull.-Doblies & D.Mull.-Doblies) J.C.Manning & Goldblatt, endemic
- Albuca ovata (Thunb.) J.C.Manning & Goldblatt, indigenous
- Albuca papyracea J.C.Manning & Goldblatt, endemic
- Albuca paradoxa Dinter, indigenous
- Albuca patersoniae Schonland, indigenous
- Albuca paucifolia (U.Mull.-Doblies & D.Mull.-Doblies) J.C.Manning & Goldblatt, endemic
  - Albuca paucifolia (U.Mull.-Doblies & D.Mull.-Doblies) J.C.Manning & Goldblatt subsp. karooparkensis, endemic
  - Albuca paucifolia (U.Mull.-Doblies & D.Mull.-Doblies) J.C.Manning & Goldblatt subsp. paucifolia, endemic
- Albuca pearsonii (F.M.Leight.) J.C.Manning & Goldblatt, indigenous
- Albuca pentheri (Zahlbr.) J.C.Manning & Goldblatt, endemic
- Albuca polyphylla Baker, indigenous
- Albuca prasina (Ker Gawl.) J.C.Manning & Goldblatt, indigenous
- Albuca prolifera J.H.Wilson, indigenous
- Albuca psammophora (U.Mull.-Doblies & D.Mull.-Doblies) J.C.Manning & Goldblatt, endemic
- Albuca pseudobifolia Mart.-Azorin & M.B.Crespo, endemic
- Albuca riebeekkasteelberganula U.Mull.-Doblies, endemic
- Albuca robertsoniana U.Mull.-Doblies, indigenous
- Albuca rogersii Schonland, indigenous
- Albuca roodeae (E.Phillips) J.C.Manning & Goldblatt, indigenous
- Albuca rupestris Hilliard & B.L.Burtt, indigenous
- Albuca sabulosa (U.Mull.-Doblies & D.Mull.-Doblies) J.C.Manning & Goldblatt, endemic
- Albuca scabrocostata (U.Mull.-Doblies & D.Mull.-Doblies) J.C.Manning & Goldblatt, endemic
- Albuca schlechteri Baker, indigenous
- Albuca schoenlandii Baker, indigenous
- Albuca secunda (Jacq.) J.C.Manning & Goldblatt, endemic
- Albuca seineri (Engl. & K.Krause) J.C.Manning & Goldblatt, indigenous
- Albuca semipedalis Baker, endemic
- Albuca setosa Jacq. indigenous
- Albuca shawii Baker, indigenous
- Albuca spiralis L.f. indigenous
- Albuca stuetzeliana (U.Mull.-Doblies & D.Mull.-Doblies) J.C.Manning & Goldblatt, indigenous
- Albuca suaveolens (Jacq.) J.C.Manning & Goldblatt, indigenous
- Albuca subglandulosa (U.Mull.-Doblies & D.Mull.-Doblies) J.C.Manning & Goldblatt, endemic
- Albuca tenuifolia Baker, indigenous
- Albuca thermarum Van Jaarsv. endemic
- Albuca tortuosa Baker, indigenous
- Albuca toxicaria (C.Archer & R.H.Archer) J.C.Manning & Goldblatt, indigenous
- Albuca trachyphylla U.Mull.-Doblies, indigenous
- Albuca transvaalensis Mogg, indigenous
- Albuca unifolia (Retz.) J.C.Manning & Goldblatt, indigenous
- Albuca unifoliata G.D.Rowley, endemic
- Albuca villosa U.Mull.-Doblies, indigenous
  - Albuca villosa U.Mull.-Doblies subsp. glabra U.Mull.-Doblies, endemic
  - Albuca villosa U.Mull.-Doblies subsp. villosa, near endemic
- Albuca virens (Ker Gawl.) J.C.Manning & Goldblatt, indigenous
  - Albuca virens (Ker Gawl.) J.C.Manning & Goldblatt subsp. arida (Oberm.) J.C.Manning & Goldblatt, indigenous
  - Albuca virens (Ker Gawl.) J.C.Manning & Goldblatt subsp. virens, indigenous
- Albuca viscosa L.f. indigenous
- Albuca viscosella U.Mull.-Doblies, accepted asAlbuca viscosa L.f.
- Albuca vittata Ker Gawl. indigenous
- Albuca watermeyeri (L.Bolus) J.C.Manning & Goldblatt, endemic
- Albuca weberlingiorum U.Mull.-Doblies, indigenous
- Albuca xanthocodon Hilliard & B.L.Burtt, indigenous
- Albuca zebrina Baker, endemic

== Amphisiphon ==
Genus Amphisiphon:

- Amphisiphon stylosa W.F.Barker, accepted as Daubenya stylosa (W.F.Barker) A.M.van der Merwe & J.C.Manning
- Androsiphon capense Schltr. accepted as Daubenya capensis (Schltr.) A.M.van der Merwe & J.C.Manning

== Baeoterpe ==
Genus Baeoterpe:

- Baeoterpe corymbosa (L.) Salisb. accepted as Lachenalia corymbosa (L.) J.C.Manning & Goldblatt, indigenous

== Bowiea ==
Genus Bowiea:

- Bowiea gariepensis Van Jaarsv. accepted as Bowiea volubilis Harv. ex Hook.f. subsp. gariepensis (Van Jaarsv.) Bruyns
- Bowiea volubilis Harv. ex Hook.f. indigenous
  - Bowiea volubilis Harv. ex Hook.f. subsp. gariepensis (Van Jaarsv.) Bruyns, indigenous
  - Bowiea volubilis Harv. ex Hook.f. subsp. volubilis, indigenous

== Brachyscypha ==
Genus Brachyscypha:

- Brachyscypha undulata (Thunb.) Baker, accepted as Lachenalia pusilla Jacq. indigenous

== Coelanthus ==
Genus Coelanthus:

- Coelanthus complicatus Willd. ex Roem. & Schult. accepted as Lachenalia reflexa Thunb. indigenous

== Daubenya ==
Genus Daubenya:

- Daubenya alba A.M.van der Merwe, endemic
- Daubenya angustifolia (L.f.) A.M.van der Merwe & J.C.Manning, accepted as Massonia angustifolia L.f. indigenous
- Daubenya aurea Lindl. endemic
- Daubenya capensis (Schltr.) A.M.van der Merwe & J.C.Manning, endemic
- Daubenya comata (Burch. ex Baker) J.C.Manning & A.M.van der Merwe, endemic
- Daubenya marginata (Willd. ex Kunth) J.C.Manning & A.M.van der Merwe, endemic
- Daubenya namaquensis (Schltr.) J.C.Manning & Goldblatt, endemic
- Daubenya stylosa (W.F.Barker) A.M.van der Merwe & J.C.Manning, endemic
- Daubenya zeyheri (Kunth) J.C.Manning & A.M.van der Merwe, endemic

== Desertia ==
Genus Desertia:

- Desertia luteovirens Mart.-Azorin, M.Pinter & Wetschnig, accepted as Massonia luteovirens (Mart.-Azorin, M.Pinter & Wetschnig) J.C.Manning, indigenous

== Dipcadi ==
Genus Dipcadi:

- Dipcadi bakerianum Bolus, indigenous
- Dipcadi brevifolium (Thunb.) Fourc. indigenous
- Dipcadi ciliare (Zeyh. ex Harv.) Baker, indigenous
- Dipcadi crispum Baker, indigenous
- Dipcadi glaucum (Burch. ex Ker Gawl.) Baker, indigenous
- Dipcadi gracillimum Baker, indigenous
- Dipcadi longifolium (Ker Gawl.) Baker, indigenous
- Dipcadi marlothii Engl. indigenous
- Dipcadi papillatum Oberm. indigenous
- Dipcadi platyphyllum Baker, indigenous
- Dipcadi rigidifolium Baker, indigenous
- Dipcadi vaginatum Baker, indigenous
- Dipcadi venenatum Schinz, accepted as Dipcadi longifolium (Ker Gawl.) Baker
- Dipcadi viride (L.) Moenc, indigenous

== Drimia ==
Genus Drimia:

- Drimia acarophylla E.Brink & A.P.Dold, endemic
- Drimia albiflora (B.Nord.) J.C.Manning & Goldblatt, endemic
- Drimia altissima (L.f.) Ker Gawl. indigenous
- Drimia angustifolia Baker, indigenous
- Drimia anomala (Baker) Baker, endemic
- Drimia arenicola (B.Nord.) J.C.Manning & Goldblatt, endemic
- Drimia barkerae Oberm. ex J.C.Manning & Goldblatt, endemic
- Drimia calcarata (Baker) Stedje, indigenous
- Drimia capensis (Burm.f.) Wijnands, endemic
- Drimia chalumnensis A.P.Dold & E.Brink, endemic
- Drimia ciliaris Jacq. accepted as Drimia elata Jacq.
- Drimia ciliata (L.f.) J.C.Manning & Goldblatt, endemic
- Drimia cochlearis Mart.-Azorin, M.B.Crespo & A.P.Dold, endemic
- Drimia convallarioides (L.f.) J.C.Manning & Goldblatt, endemic
- Drimia cooperi (Baker) Benth. ex Baker, accepted as Drimia echinostachya (Baker) Eggli & N.R.Crouch
- Drimia cooperi Baker, accepted as Ledebouria concoor (Baker) Jessop, endemic
- Drimia cremnophila Van Jaarsv. endemic
- Drimia cuscutoides (Burch. ex Baker) J.C.Manning & Goldblatt, accepted as Drimia intricata (Baker) J.C.Manning & Goldblatt indigenous
- Drimia cyanelloides (Baker) J.C.Manning & Goldblatt, endemic
- Drimia delagoensis (Baker) Jessop, indigenous
- Drimia depressa (Baker) Jessop, indigenous
- Drimia dregei (Baker) J.C.Manning & Goldblatt, endemic
- Drimia echinostachya (Baker) Eggli & N.R.Crouch, endemic
- Drimia elata Jacq. indigenous
- Drimia ensifolia Eckl. accepted as Ledebouria ensifolia (Eckl.) S.Venter & T.J.Edwards
- Drimia exuviata (Jacq.) Jessop, endemic
- Drimia fasciata (B.Nord.) J.C.Manning & Goldblatt, indigenous
- Drimia filifolia (Jacq.) J.C.Manning & Goldblatt, endemic
- Drimia fimbrimarginata Snijman, endemic
- Drimia flagellaris T.J.Edwards, D.Styles & N.R.Crouch, endemic
- Drimia fragrans (Jacq.) J.C.Manning & Goldblatt, endemic
- Drimia haworthioides Baker, endemic
- Drimia hesperantha J.C.Manning & Goldblatt, endemic
- Drimia hyacinthoides Baker, endemic
- Drimia indica (Roxb.) Jessop, indigenous
- Drimia intricata (Baker) J.C.Manning & Goldblatt, indigenous
- Drimia involuta (J.C.Manning & Snijman) J.C.Manning & Goldblatt, endemic
- Drimia karooica (Oberm.) J.C.Manning & Goldblatt, endemic
- Drimia kniphofioides (Baker) J.C.Manning & Goldblatt, endemic
- Drimia ligulata J.C.Manning & Goldblatt, endemic
- Drimia loedolffiae Van Jaarsv. endemic
- Drimia macrantha (Baker) Baker, indigenous
- Drimia macrocentra (Baker) Jessop, indigenous
- Drimia marginata (Thunb.) Jessop, endemic
- Drimia media Jacq., endemic
- Drimia minor (A.V.Duthie) Jessop, endemic
- Drimia montana A.P.Dold & E.Brink, endemic
- Drimia multifolia (G.J.Lewis) Jessop, endemic
- Drimia multisetosa (Baker) Jessop, indigenous
- Drimia mzimvubuensis Van Jaarsv. endemic
- Drimia nana (Snijman) J.C.Manning & Goldblatt, endemic
- Drimia neriniformis Baker, accepted as Drimia sphaerocephala Baker
- Drimia physodes (Jacq.) Jessop, indigenous
- Drimia platyphylla (B.Nord.) J.C.Manning & Goldblatt, indigenous
- Drimia pulchromarginata J.C.Manning & Goldblatt, endemic
- Drimia pusilla Jacq. endemic
- Drimia robusta Baker, accepted as Drimia elata Jacq.
- Drimia salteri (Compton) J.C.Manning & Goldblatt, endemic
- Drimia sanguinea (Schinz) Jessop, indigenous
- Drimia sclerophylla J.C.Manning & Goldblatt, endemic
- Drimia sigmoidea J.C.Manning & Deacon, indigenous
- Drimia sphaerocephala Baker, indigenous
- Drimia stenocarpa J.C.Manning & Deacon, endemic
- Drimia uniflora J.C.Manning & Goldblatt, indigenous
- Drimia uranthera (R.A.Dyer) J.C.Manning & Goldblatt, endemic
- Drimia vermiformis J.C.Manning & Goldblatt, endemic
- Drimia virens (Schltr.) J.C.Manning & Goldblatt, endemic

== Drimiopsis ==
Genus Drimiopsis:

- Drimiopsis atropurpurea N.E.Br. accepted as Ledebouria atropurpurea (N.E.Br.) J.C.Manning & Goldblatt
- Drimiopsis burkei Baker, accepted as Ledebouria burkei (Baker) J.C.Manning & Goldblatt
  - Drimiopsis burkei Baker subsp. stolonissima U.Mull.-Doblies & D.Mull.-Doblies, accepted as Ledebouria burkei (Baker) J.C.Manning & Goldblatt subsp. stolonissima (U.Mull.-Doblies & D.Mull.-Doblies)
- Drimiopsis comptonii U.Mull.-Doblies & D.Mull.-Doblies, accepted as Ledebouria comptonii (U.Mull.-Doblies & D.Mull.-Doblies) J.C.Manning & Goldblatt
- Drimiopsis davidsoniae U.Mull.-Doblies & D.Mull.-Doblies, accepted as Ledebouria davidsoniae (U.Mull.-Doblies & D.Mull.-Doblies) J.C.Manning & Goldblatt
- Drimiopsis lachenalioides (Baker) Jessop, accepted as Ledebouria lachenalioides (Baker) J.C.Manning & Goldblatt
- Drimiopsis linioseta Hankey & Lebatha, accepted as Ledebouria linioseta (Hankey & Lebatha) J.C.Manning & Goldblatt, indigenous
- Drimiopsis maculata Lindl. & Paxton, accepted as Ledebouria petiolata J.C.Manning & Goldblatt
- Drimiopsis maxima Baker, accepted as Ledebouria humifusa (Baker) J.C.Manning & Goldblatt
- Drimiopsis pusilla U.Mull.-Doblies & D.Mull.-Doblies, accepted as Ledebouria pusilla (U.Mull.-Doblies & D.Mull.-Doblies) J.C.Manning & Goldblatt
- Drimiopsis reilleyana U.Mull.-Doblies & D.Mull.-Doblies, accepted as Ledebouria reilleyana (U.Mull.-Doblies & D.Mull.-Doblies) J.C.Manning & Goldblatt
- Drimiopsis woodii Baker, accepted as Ledebouria woodii (Baker) J.C.Manning & Goldblatt

== Eliokarmos ==
Genus Eliokarmos:

- Eliokarmos craibii Mart.-Azorin, M.B.Crespo, M.Pinter & Wetschnig, accepted as Ornithogalum craibii (Mart.-Azorin, M.B.Crespo, M.Pinter & Wetschnig) J.C.Manning, endemic

== Elsiea ==
Genus Elsiea:

- Elsiea corymbosa F.M.Leight. accepted as Ornithogalum esterhuyseniae Oberm.

== Ethesia ==
Genus Ethesia:

- Ethesia tanquana Mart.-Azorin & M.B.Crespo, accepted as Ornithogalum tanquanum (Mart.-Azorin & M.B.Crespo) J.C.Manning & Goldblatt

== Eucomis ==
Genus Eucomis:

- Eucomis amaryllidifolia Baker, indigenous
- Eucomis autumnalis (Mill.) Chitt. indigenous
  - Eucomis autumnalis (Mill.) Chitt. subsp. amaryllidifolia (Baker) Reyneke, indigenous
  - Eucomis autumnalis (Mill.) Chitt. subsp. autumnalis, indigenous
  - Eucomis autumnalis (Mill.) Chitt. subsp. clavata (Baker) Reyneke, indigenous
- Eucomis bicolor Baker, indigenous
- Eucomis bifolia Jacq. accepted as Massonia bifolia (Jacq.) J.C.Manning & Goldblatt, indigenous
- Eucomis comosa (Houtt.) Wehrh. indigenous
  - Eucomis comosa (Houtt.) Wehrh. var. comosa, endemic
  - Eucomis comosa (Houtt.) Wehrh. var. striata (G.Don) Willd. endemic
- Eucomis grimshawii G.D.Duncan & Zonn. endemic
- Eucomis humilis Baker, indigenous
- Eucomis montana Compton, indigenous
- Eucomis pallidiflora Baker, indigenous
  - Eucomis pallidiflora Baker subsp. pallidiflora, indigenous
  - Eucomis pallidiflora Baker subsp. pole-evansii (N.E.Br.) Reyneke ex J.C.Manning, indigenous
- Eucomis pillansii L.Guthrie, accepted as Eucomis regia (L.) L'Her.
- Eucomis pole-evansii N.E.Br. accepted as Eucomis pallidiflora Baker subsp. pole-evansii (N.E.Br.) Reyneke ex J.C.Manning
- Eucomis regia (L.) L'Her. endemic
- Eucomis schijffii Reyneke, indigenous
- Eucomis vandermerwei I.Verd. endemic
- Eucomis zambesiaca Baker, indigenous

== Galtonia ==
Genus Galtonia:

- Galtonia candicans (Baker) Decne. accepted as Ornithogalum candicans (Baker) J.C.Manning & Goldblatt
- Galtonia princeps (Baker) Decne. accepted as Ornithogalum princeps (Baker) J.C.Manning & Goldblatt
- Galtonia regalis Hilliard & B.L.Burtt, accepted as Ornithogalum regale (Hilliard & B.L.Burtt) J.C.Manning & Goldblatt
- Galtonia viridiflora I.Verd. accepted as Ornithogalum viridiflorum (I.Verd.) J.C.Manning & Goldblatt

== Hyacinthus ==
Genus Hyacinthus:

- Hyacinthus bifolius Boiteau ex Cav. accepted as Lachenalia pygmaea (Jacq.) G.D.Duncan, indigenous
- Hyacinthus corymbosus L. accepted as Lachenalia corymbosa (L.) J.C.Manning & Goldblatt, indigenous
- Hyacinthus gawleri (Kunth) Baker, accepted as Lachenalia corymbosa (L.) J.C.Manning & Goldblatt, indigenous
- Hyacinthus orchioides L. accepted as Lachenalia orchioides (L.) Aiton, indigenous
- Hyacinthus paucifolius W.F.Barker, accepted as Lachenalia paucifolia (W.F.Barker) J.C.Manning & Goldblatt, indigenous

== Lachenalia ==
Genus Lachenalia:

- Lachenalia adamii G.D.Duncan, endemic
- Lachenalia alba W.F.Barker ex G.D.Duncan, endemic
- Lachenalia albida Tratt. accepted as Lachenalia contaminata Aiton, indigenous
- Lachenalia algoensis Schonland, endemic
- Lachenalia aloides (L.f.) Engl. endemic
  - Lachenalia aloides (L.f.) Engl. var. aurea (Lindl.) Engl. accepted as Lachenalia flava Andrews, endemic
  - Lachenalia aloides (L.f.) Engl. var. quadricolor (Jacq.) Engl. accepted as Lachenalia quadricolor Jacq. endemic
  - Lachenalia aloides (L.f.) Engl. var. vanzyliae W.F.Barker, accepted as Lachenalia vanzyliae (W.F.Barker) G.D.Duncan & T.J.Edwards, endemic
  - Lachenalia aloides (L.f.) Hort. ex Asch. & Graebn. accepted as Lachenalia aloides (L.f.) Engl. indigenous
  - Lachenalia aloides (L.f.) Pers. accepted as Lachenalia aloides (L.f.) Engl. indigenous
- Lachenalia ameliae W.F.Barker, endemic
- Lachenalia angelica W.F.Barker, endemic
- Lachenalia anguinea Sweet, endemic
- Lachenalia angustifolia Jacq. accepted as Lachenalia contaminata Aiton, indigenous
- Lachenalia arbuthnotiae W.F.Barker, endemic
- Lachenalia arenicola G.D.Duncan & Helme, endemic
- Lachenalia argillicola G.D.Duncan, endemic
- Lachenalia attenuata W.F.Barker ex G.D.Duncan, endemic
- Lachenalia aurea Lindl. accepted as Lachenalia flava Andrews, indigenous
- Lachenalia aurioliae G.D.Duncan, endemic
- Lachenalia bachmannii Baker, endemic
- Lachenalia barbarae G.D.Duncan, endemic
- Lachenalia barkeriana U.Mull.-Doblies, B.Nord. & D.Mull.-Doblies, endemic
- Lachenalia bicolor Lodd. accepted as Lachenalia pallida Aiton, indigenous
- Lachenalia bifolia (Burm.f.) W.F.Barker ex G.D.Duncan accepted as Lachenalia bulbifera (Cirillo) Engl. endemic
  - Lachenalia bifolia Ker Gawl. accepted as Lachenalia rosea Andrews, indigenous
- Lachenalia bolusii W.F.Barker, endemic
- Lachenalia botryoides Tratt. accepted as Lachenalia purpureo-caerulea Jacq. indigenous
- Lachenalia bowieana Baker accepted as Lachenalia nervosa Ker Gawl. indigenous
- Lachenalia bowkeri Baker, endemic
- Lachenalia brevipes Baker accepted as Lachenalia bachmannii Baker, indigenous
- Lachenalia bruynsii G.D.Duncan, endemic
- Lachenalia buchubergensis Dinter, indigenous
- Lachenalia bulbifera (Cirillo) Engl. endemic
- Lachenalia calcicola (U.Mull.-Doblies & D.Mull.-Doblies) G.D.Duncan, endemic
- Lachenalia callista G.D.Duncan & T.J.Edwards, endemic
- Lachenalia campanulata Baker, endemic
- Lachenalia canaliculata G.D.Duncan, endemic
- Lachenalia capensis W.F.Barker, endemic
- Lachenalia carnosa Baker, endemic
- Lachenalia cernua G.D.Duncan, endemic
- Lachenalia comptonii W.F.Barker, endemic
- Lachenalia concordiana Schltr. ex W.F.Barker, endemic
- Lachenalia congesta W.F.Barker, endemic
- Lachenalia contaminata Aiton, endemic
- Lachenalia convallariodora Stapf, accepted as Lachenalia fistulosa Baker, indigenous
- Lachenalia convallarioides Baker, endemic
- Lachenalia convallarioides Baker var. robusta Baker, accepted as Lachenalia convallarioides Baker, indigenous
- Lachenalia cooperi Baker, endemic
- Lachenalia corymbosa (L.) J.C.Manning & Goldblatt, endemic
- Lachenalia dasybotrya Diels, endemic
- Lachenalia dehoopensis W.F.Barker, endemic
- Lachenalia doleritica G.D.Duncan, endemic
- Lachenalia duncanii W.F.Barker, endemic
- Lachenalia elegans W.F.Barker, endemic
  - Lachenalia elegans W.F.Barker var. flava W.F.Barker, accepted as Lachenalia karoopoortensis G.D.Duncan, endemic
  - Lachenalia elegans W.F.Barker var. membranacea W.F.Barker, accepted as Lachenalia membranacea (W.F.Barker) G.D.Duncan, endemic
  - Lachenalia elegans W.F.Barker var. suaveolens W.F.Barker, accepted as Lachenalia suaveolens (W.F.Barker) G.D.Duncan, endemic
- Lachenalia ensifolia (Thunb.) J.C.Manning & Goldblatt, endemic
  - Lachenalia ensifolia (Thunb.) J.C.Manning & Goldblatt subsp. ensifolia, endemic
  - Lachenalia ensifolia (Thunb.) J.C.Manning & Goldblatt subsp. maughanii (W.F.Barker) G.D.Duncan, endemic
- Lachenalia esterhuyseniae W.F.Barker, accepted as Lachenalia juncifolia Baker, endemic
- Lachenalia fistulosa Baker, endemic
- Lachenalia flava Andrews, endemic
- Lachenalia fragrans Andrews, accepted as Lachenalia nervosa Ker Gawl. indigenous
- Lachenalia fragrans Jacq. accepted as Lachenalia pallida Aiton, indigenous
  - Lachenalia fragrans Lodd. accepted asLachenalia contaminata Aiton, indigenous
- Lachenalia framesii W.F.Barker, endemic
- Lachenalia giessii W.F.Barker, indigenous
- Lachenalia gillettii W.F.Barker, accepted as Lachenalia pallida Aiton, endemic
- Lachenalia glauca (W.F.Barker) G.D.Duncan, endemic
- Lachenalia glaucina Jacq. accepted as Lachenalia orchioides (L.) Aiton subsp. glaucina (Jacq.) G.D.Duncan, indigenous
  - Lachenalia glaucina Jacq. var. parviflora W.F.Barker, accepted as Lachenalia orchioides (L.) Aiton subsp. parviflora (W.F.Barker) G.D.Duncan, indigenous
- Lachenalia glaucophylla W.F.Barker, endemic
- Lachenalia graminifolia Sol. ex Baker, accepted as Dipcadi hyacinthoides Baker
- Lachenalia haarlemensis Fourc. endemic
- Lachenalia hirta (Thunb.) Thunb. endemic
  - Lachenalia hirta (Thunb.) Thunb. var. exserta W.F.Barker, accepted as Lachenalia hirta (Thunb.) Thunb. endemic
- Lachenalia hyacinthina Hort. accepted as Lachenalia contaminata Aiton, indigenous
- Lachenalia hyacinthoides Jacq. accepted as Lachenalia contaminata Aiton, indigenous
- Lachenalia inconspicua G.D.Duncan, endemic
- Lachenalia isopetala Jacq. endemic
- Lachenalia judithiae G.D.Duncan, endemic
- Lachenalia juncifolia Baker, endemic
  - Lachenalia juncifolia Baker var. campanulata W.F.Barker accepted as Lachenalia magentea G.D.Duncan, endemic
- Lachenalia karooica W.F.Barker ex G.D.Duncan, endemic
- Lachenalia karoopoortensis G.D.Duncan, endemic
- Lachenalia klinghardtiana Dinter, indigenous
- Lachenalia kliprandensis W.F.Barker, endemic
- Lachenalia krugeri G.D.Duncan, endemic
- Lachenalia lactosa G.D.Duncan, endemic
- Lachenalia lanceaefolia Jacq. accepted as Ledebouria revoluta (L.f.) Jessop, indigenous
  - Lachenalia lanceaefolia Sims var. maculata Tratt. accepted as Ledebouria revoluta (L.f.) Jessop, indigenous
- Lachenalia latifolia Tratt. accepted as Lachenalia nervosa Ker Gawl. indigenous
- Lachenalia latimerae W.F.Barker, endemic
- Lachenalia leipoldtii G.D.Duncan, endemic
- Lachenalia leomontana W.F.Barker, endemic
- Lachenalia lilacina Baker, accepted as Lachenalia orchioides (L.) Aiton subsp. glaucina (Jacq.) G.D.Duncan, indigenous
- Lachenalia liliiflora Jacq. endemic
- Lachenalia linguiformis Lam. accepted as Lachenalia bulbifera (Cirillo) Engl. indigenous
- Lachenalia longibracteata E.Phillips, endemic
- Lachenalia longituba (A.M.van der Merwe) J.C.Manning & Goldblatt, endemic
- Lachenalia lucida Ker Gawl. accepted as Lachenalia pallida Aiton, indigenous
- Lachenalia lutea G.D.Duncan, endemic
- Lachenalia luteola Jacq. endemic
  - Lachenalia luteola Jacq. var. pallida Tratt. accepted as Lachenalia luteola Jacq. indigenous
- Lachenalia lutzeyeri G.D.Duncan, endemic
- Lachenalia macgregoriorum W.F.Barker, endemic
- Lachenalia macrophylla Lem. accepted as Lachenalia flava Andrews, indigenous
- Lachenalia maculata Tratt. accepted as Ledebouria revoluta (L.f.) Jessop, indigenous
- Lachenalia magentea G.D.Duncan, endemic
- Lachenalia margaretiae W.F.Barker, endemic
- Lachenalia marginata W.F.Barker, endemic
  - Lachenalia marginata W.F.Barker subsp. marginata, endemic
  - Lachenalia marginata W.F.Barker subsp. neglecta Schltr. ex G.D.Duncan, endemic
- Lachenalia marlothii W.F.Barker ex G.D. endemic
- Lachenalia martiniae W.F.Barker, endemic
- Lachenalia martleyi G.D.Duncan, endemic
- Lachenalia massonii Baker, accepted as Lachenalia trichophylla Baker, indigenous
- Lachenalia mathewsii W.F.Barker, endemic
- Lachenalia maughanii (W.F.Barker) J.C.Manning & Goldblatt, accepted as Lachenalia ensifolia (Thunb.) J.C.Manning & Goldblatt subsp. maughanii (W.F.Barker) G.D.Duncan, endemic
- Lachenalia maximiliani Schltr. ex W.F.Barker, endemic
- Lachenalia mediana Jacq. endemic
  - Lachenalia mediana Jacq. subsp. mediana, endemic
  - Lachenalia mediana Jacq. subsp. rogersii (Baker) G.D.Duncan, endemic
  - Lachenalia mediana Jacq. var. rogersii (Baker) W.F.Barker, accepted as Lachenalia mediana Jacq. subsp. rogersii (Baker) G.D.Duncan, endemic
- Lachenalia membranacea (W.F.Barker) G.D.Duncan, endemic
- Lachenalia minima W.F.Barker, endemic
- Lachenalia moniliformis W.F.Barker, endemic
- Lachenalia montana Schltr. ex W.F.Barker, endemic
- Lachenalia muirii W.F.Barker, accepted as Lachenalia sessiliflora Andrews, endemic
- Lachenalia multifolia W.F.Barker, endemic
- Lachenalia mutabilis Lodd. ex Sweet, endemic
- Lachenalia namaquensis Schltr. ex W.F.Barker, endemic
- Lachenalia nardousbergensis G.D.Duncan, endemic
- Lachenalia neilii W.F.Barker ex G.D.Duncan, endemic
- Lachenalia nervosa Ker Gawl. endemic
- Lachenalia nordenstamii W.F.Barker, indigenous
- Lachenalia obscura Schltr. ex G.D.Duncan, endemic
- Lachenalia odoratissima Baker, accepted as Lachenalia pallida Aiton, indigenous
- Lachenalia orchioides (L.) Aiton, endemic
  - Lachenalia orchioides (L.) Aiton subsp. glaucina (Jacq.) G.D.Duncan, endemic
  - Lachenalia orchioides (L.) Aiton subsp. orchioides, endemic
  - Lachenalia orchioides (L.) Aiton subsp. parviflora (W.F.Barker) G.D.Duncan, endemic
  - Lachenalia orchioides (L.) Aiton var. glaucina (Jacq.) W.F.Barker, accepted as Lachenalia orchioides (L.) Aiton subsp. glaucina (Jacq.) G.D.Duncan, endemic
- Lachenalia orthopetala Jacq. endemic
- Lachenalia ovatifolia L.Guthrie, accepted as Lachenalia carnosa Baker, indigenous
- Lachenalia pallida Aiton, endemic
  - Lachenalia pallida Lindl. accepted as Lachenalia orchioides (L.) Aiton subsp. glaucina (Jacq.) G.D.Duncan, indigenous
  - Lachenalia pallida Lindl. var. coerulescens Lindl. accepted as Lachenalia orchioides (L.) Aiton subsp. glaucina (Jacq.) G.D.Duncan, indigenous
- Lachenalia patentissima G.D.Duncan, endemic
- Lachenalia patula Jacq. endemic
- Lachenalia paucifolia (W.F.Barker) J.C.Manning & Goldblatt, endemic
- Lachenalia peersii Marloth ex W.F.Barker, endemic
- Lachenalia pendula Aiton, accepted as Lachenalia bulbifera (Cirillo) Engl. endemic
- Lachenalia perryae G.D.Duncan, endemic
- Lachenalia petiolata Baker, accepted as Lachenalia pusilla Jacq. indigenous
- Lachenalia physocaulos W.F.Barker, endemic
- Lachenalia polyphylla Baker, endemic
- Lachenalia polypodantha Schltr. ex W.F.Barker, endemic
  - Lachenalia polypodantha Schltr. ex W.F.Barker subsp. eburnea G.D.Duncan, endemic
  - Lachenalia polypodantha Schltr. ex W.F.Barker subsp. polypodantha, endemic
- Lachenalia punctata Jacq. endemic
- Lachenalia purpurea Jacq. accepted as Lachenalia pallida Aiton, indigenous
- Lachenalia purpureo-caerulea Jacq. endemic
- Lachenalia pusilla Jacq. endemic
- Lachenalia pustulata F.Dietr. accepted as Lachenalia pallida Aiton, indigenous
  - Lachenalia pustulata Jacq. accepted as Lachenalia pallida Aiton, endemic
  - Lachenalia pustulata Jacq. var. densiflora Tratt. accepted as Lachenalia pallida Aiton, indigenous
- Lachenalia pygmaea (Jacq.) G.D.Duncan, endemic
- Lachenalia pyramidalis Dehnh. accepted as Lachenalia pallida Aiton, indigenous
- Lachenalia quadricolor Jacq. endemic
- Lachenalia quadricolor Jacq. var. lutea Sims, accepted as Lachenalia flava Andrews, indigenous
- Lachenalia racemosa Ker Gawl. accepted as Lachenalia pallida Aiton, indigenous
- Lachenalia reclinata F.Dietr. accepted as Lachenalia pallida Aiton, indigenous
- Lachenalia reflexa Thunb. endemic
- Lachenalia rhodantha Baker, accepted as Lachenalia campanulata Baker, indigenous
- Lachenalia roodeae E.Phillips, accepted as Lachenalia splendida Diels, indigenous
- Lachenalia rosea Andrews, endemic
- Lachenalia rubida Jacq. accepted as Lachenalia punctata Jacq. indigenous
  - Lachenalia rubida Jacq. var. punctata (Jacq.) Baker, accepted as Lachenalia punctata Jacq. endemic
  - Lachenalia rubida Jacq. var. tigrina (Jacq.) Baker, accepted as Lachenalia punctata Jacq. endemic
- Lachenalia salteri W.F.Barker, endemic
- Lachenalia sanguinolenta Willd. ex Kunth, accepted as Lachenalia rosea Andrews, indigenous
- Lachenalia sargeantii W.F.Barker, endemic
- Lachenalia schelpei W.F.Barker, endemic
- Lachenalia schlechteri Baker, endemic
- Lachenalia sessiliflora Andrews, endemic
- Lachenalia speciosa F.Dietr. accepted as Dipcadi glaucum (Burch. ex Ker Gawl.) Baker, indigenous
- Lachenalia splendida Diels, endemic
- Lachenalia stayneri W.F.Barker, endemic
- Lachenalia suaveolens (W.F.Barker) G.D.Duncan, endemic
- Lachenalia subspicata Fourc. accepted as Lachenalia bowkeri Baker, indigenous
- Lachenalia succulenta Masson ex Baker, accepted as Lachenalia patula Jacq. indigenous
- Lachenalia summerfieldii G.D.Duncan, endemic
- Lachenalia thomasiae W.F.Barker ex G.D.Duncan, endemic
- Lachenalia thunbergii G.D.Duncan & T.J.Edwards, endemic
- Lachenalia tigrina Jacq.Lachenalia punctata Jacq. indigenous
- Lachenalia trichophylla Baker, endemic
- Lachenalia tricolor Jacq. accepted as Lachenalia aloides (L.f.) Engl. indigenous
- Lachenalia tricolor Thunb. accepted as Lachenalia aloides (L.f.) Engl. indigenous
  - Lachenalia tricolor Thunb. var. aurea (Lindl.) Baker accepted as Lachenalia flava Andrews, indigenous
  - Lachenalia tricolor Thunb. var. aurea (Lindl.) Hook.f. accepted as Lachenalia flava Andrews, indigenous
  - Lachenalia tricolor Thunb. var. luteola (Jacq.) Baker, accepted as Lachenalia luteola Jacq. indigenous
  - Lachenalia tricolor Thunb. var. luteola Ker Gawl. accepted as Lachenalia flava Andrews, indigenous
  - Lachenalia tricolor Thunb. var. quadricolor (Jacq.) Baker, accepted as Lachenalia quadricolor Jacq. indigenous
- Lachenalia undulata Masson ex Baker, endemic
- Lachenalia unicolor Jacq. accepted as Lachenalia pallida Aiton, endemic
  - Lachenalia unicolor Jacq. var. fragrans (Jacq.) Baker, accepted as Lachenalia pallida Aiton, indigenous
  - Lachenalia unicolor Jacq. var. purpurea (Jacq.) Baker, accepted as Lachenalia pallida Aiton, indigenous
- Lachenalia unifolia Jacq. endemic
  - Lachenalia unifolia Jacq. var. pappei Baker, accepted as Lachenalia rosea Andrews, indigenous
  - Lachenalia unifolia Jacq. var. rogersii Baker, accepted as Lachenalia mediana Jacq. subsp. rogersii (Baker) G.D.Duncan, indigenous
  - Lachenalia unifolia Jacq. var. schlechteri (Baker) W.F.Barker, accepted as Lachenalia schlechteri Baker, endemic
  - Lachenalia unifolia Jacq. var. wrightii Baker, accepted as Lachenalia wrightii Baker, endemic
  - Lachenalia ustulata Banks ex Schult. & Schult.f. accepted as Lachenalia orthopetala Jacq. indigenous
- Lachenalia valeriae G.D.Duncan, endemic
- Lachenalia vanzyliae (W.F.Barker) G.D.Duncan & T.J.Edwards, endemic
- Lachenalia variegata W.F.Barker, endemic
- Lachenalia ventricosa Schltr. ex W.F.Barker, endemic
- Lachenalia versicolor Baker var. fragrans (Jacq.) Baker, accepted as Lachenalia pallida Aiton, indigenous
  - Lachenalia versicolor Baker var. purpurea (Jacq.) Baker, accepted as Lachenalia pallida Aiton, indigenous
  - Lachenalia versicolor Baker var. unicolor (Jacq.) Baker, accepted as Lachenalia pallida Aiton, indigenous
- Lachenalia verticillata W.F.Barker, endemic
- Lachenalia violacea Jacq. endemic
  - Lachenalia violacea Jacq. var. glauca W.F.Barker, accepted as Lachenalia glauca (W.F.Barker) G.D.Duncan, endemic
- Lachenalia viridiflora W.F.Barker, endemic
- Lachenalia viridis (L.) Aiton, accepted as Dipcadi viride (L.) Moench, indigenous
- Lachenalia whitehillensis W.F.Barker, endemic
- Lachenalia wrightii Baker, endemic
- Lachenalia xerophila Schltr. ex G.D.Duncan, endemic
- Lachenalia youngii Baker, endemic
- Lachenalia zebrina W.F.Barker, endemic
  - Lachenalia zebrina W.F.Barker forma densiflora W.F.Barker, accepted as Lachenalia zebrina W.F.Barker, endemic
- Lachenalia zeyheri Baker, endemic

== Ledebouria ==
Genus Ledebouria:

- Ledebouria apertiflora (Baker) Jessop, indigenous
- Ledebouria asperifolia (Van der Merwe) S.Venter, indigenous
- Ledebouria atrobrunnea S.Venter, endemic
- Ledebouria atropurpurea (N.E.Br.) J.C.Manning & Goldblatt, endemic
- Ledebouria burkei (Baker) J.C.Manning & Goldblatt, indigenous
  - Ledebouria burkei (Baker) J.C.Manning & Goldblatt subsp. burkei, indigenous
  - Ledebouria burkei (Baker) J.C.Manning & Goldblatt subsp. stolonissima (U.Mull.-Doblies & D.Mull.-Dob, endemic
- Ledebouria comptonii (U.Mull.-Doblies & D.Mull.-Doblies) J.C.Manning & Goldblatt, endemic
- Ledebouria concoor (Baker) Jessop, endemic
- Ledebouria confusa S.Venter, indigenous
- Ledebouria cooperi (Hook.f.) Jessop, indigenous
- Ledebouria coriacea S.Venter, endemic
- Ledebouria cremnophila S.Venter & Van Jaarsv., endemic
- Ledebouria crispa S.Venter, endemic
- Ledebouria davidsoniae (U.Mull.-Doblies & D.Mull.-Doblies) J.C.Manning & Goldblatt, endemic
- Ledebouria dolomiticola S.Venter, endemic
- Ledebouria ensifolia (Eckl.) S.Venter & T.J.Edwards, indigenous
- Ledebouria floribunda (Baker) Jessop, indigenous
- Ledebouria galpinii (Baker) S.Venter & T.J.Edwards, endemic
- Ledebouria glauca S.Venter, indigenous
- Ledebouria graminifolia (Baker) Jessop, accepted as Ledebouria leptophylla (Baker) S.Venter, endemic
- Ledebouria humifusa (Baker) J.C.Manning & Goldblatt, endemic
- Ledebouria hypoxidioides (Schonland) Jessop, endemic
- Ledebouria inquinata (C.A.Sm.) Jessop, indigenous
- Ledebouria lachenalioides (Baker) J.C.Manning & Goldblatt, endemic
- Ledebouria lepida (N.E.Br.) S.Venter, endemic
- Ledebouria leptophylla (Baker) S.Venter, indigenous
- Ledebouria linioseta (Hankey & Lebatha) J.C.Manning & Goldblatt, endemic
- Ledebouria luteola Jessop, indigenous
- Ledebouria macowanii (Baker) S.Venter, indigenous
- Ledebouria marginata (Baker) Jessop, indigenous
- Ledebouria maxima (Van der Merwe) J.C.Manning & Goldblatt, endemic
- Ledebouria megaphylla (Hankey ex J.M.H.Shaw) Van Jaarsv. & Eggli, indigenous
- Ledebouria minima (Baker) S.Venter, indigenous
- Ledebouria minor (Van der Merwe) J.C.Manning & Goldblatt, endemic
- Ledebouria mokobulanensis Hankey & T.J.Edwards, endemic
- Ledebouria monophylla S.Venter, indigenous
- Ledebouria ovalifolia (Schrad.) Jessop, endemic
  - Ledebouria ovatifolia (Baker) Jessop, indigenous
  - Ledebouria ovatifolia (Baker) Jessop subsp. ovatifolia , endemic
  - Ledebouria ovatifolia (Baker) Jessop subsp. scabrida N.R.Crouch & T.J.Edwards, endemic
- Ledebouria papillata S.Venter, indigenous
- Ledebouria pardalota S.Venter, indigenous
- Ledebouria parvifolia S.Venter, endemic
- Ledebouria petiolata J.C.Manning & Goldblatt, indigenous
- Ledebouria pilosa (Van der Merwe) J.C.Manning & Goldblatt, endemic
- Ledebouria pustulata S.Venter, endemic
- Ledebouria remifolia S.Venter, indigenous
- Ledebouria revoluta (L.f.) Jessop, indigenous
- Ledebouria rupestris (Van der Merwe) S.Venter, indigenous
- Ledebouria sandersonii (Baker) S.Venter & T.J.Edwards, indigenous
- Ledebouria socialis (Baker) Jessop, endemic
- Ledebouria transvaalensis (Van der Merwe) J.C.Manning & Goldblatt, endemic
- Ledebouria undulata (Jacq.) Jessop, indigenous
- Ledebouria venteri Van Jaarsv. & A.E.van Wyk, endemic
- Ledebouria viscosa Jessop, endemic
- Ledebouria woodii (Baker) J.C.Manning & Goldblatt, endemic
- Ledebouria zebrina (Baker) S.Venter, indigenous

== Lindneria ==
Genus Lindneria:

- Lindneria clavata (Mast.) Speta, accepted as Pseudogaltonia clavata (Mast.) E.Phillips

== Litanthus ==
Genus Litanthus:

- Litanthus pusillus Harv, accepted as Drimia uniflora J.C.Manning & Goldblatt

== Massonia ==
Genus Massonia:

- Massonia amoena Mart.-Azorin, M.Pinter & Wetschnig, indigenous
- Massonia angustifolia L.f. endemic
- Massonia bifolia (Jacq.) J.C.Manning & Goldblatt, indigenous
- Massonia bokkeveldiana Poelln, accepted as Massonia tenella Sol. ex Baker, indigenous
- Massonia calvata Baker, indigenous
- Massonia citrina M.Pinter, Deutsch, U.Mull.-Doblies & D.Mull.-Doblies, endemic
- Massonia corymbosa (L.) Ker Gawl, accepted as Lachenalia corymbosa (L.) J.C.Manning & Goldblatt, indigenous
- Massonia dentata Mart.-Azorin, V.R.Clark, M.Pinter, M.B.Crespo & Wetschnig, indigenous
- Massonia depressa Houtt. endemic
- Massonia echinata L.f. endemic
- Massonia ensifolia (Thunb.) Ker Gawl, accepted as Lachenalia ensifolia (Thunb.) J.C.Manning & Goldblatt, indigenous
- Massonia grandiflora Lindl, accepted as Massonia depressa Houtt.
- Massonia hirsuta Link & Otto, accepted as Massonia echinata L.f.
- Massonia jasminiflora Burch. ex Baker, indigenous
- Massonia lanceolata Thunb, accepted as Massonia angustifolia L.f. indigenous
- Massonia latebrosa Masson ex Baker, endemic
- Massonia luteovirens (Mart.-Azorin, M.Pinter & Wetschnig) J.C.Manning, indigenous
- Massonia odorata Hook.f, accepted as Lachenalia ensifolia (Thunb.) J.C.Manning & Goldblatt, indigenous
- Massonia pseudoechinata Mart.-Azorin, M.Pinter & Wetschnig, endemic
- Massonia pustulata Jacq. endemic
- Massonia pygmaea Kunth, indigenous
  - Massonia pygmaea Kunth subsp. kamiesbergensis U.Mull.-Doblies & D.Mull.-Doblies, endemic
- Massonia pygmaea Kunth subsp. pygmaea, endemic
- Massonia roggeveldensis Mart.-Azorin, M.Pinter & Wetschnig, endemic
- Massonia sempervirens U.Mull.-Doblies, G.Milkuhn & D.Mull.-Doblies, endemic
- Massonia sessiliflora (Dinter) Mart.-Azorin, M.B.Crespo, M.Pinter & Wetschnig, indigenous
- Massonia sessiliflora (Dinter) U.Mull.-Doblies & D.Mull.-Doblies, accepted as Massonia sessiliflora (Dinter) Mart.-Azorin, M.B.Crespo, M.Pinter & Wetschnig, indigenous
- Massonia setulosa Baker, indigenous
- Massonia tenella Sol. ex Baker, endemic
- Massonia undulata Thunb, accepted as Lachenalia pusilla Jacq. indigenous
- Massonia uniflora Sol. ex Baker, accepted as Lachenalia ensifolia (Thunb.) J.C.Manning & Goldblatt, indigenous
- Massonia violacea Andrews, accepted as Lachenalia pygmaea (Jacq.) G.D.Duncan, indigenous
- Massonia wittebergensis U.Mull.-Doblies & D.Mull.-Doblies, endemic

== Merwilla ==
Genus Merwilla:

- Merwilla dracomontana (Hilliard & B.L.Burtt) Speta, endemic
- Merwilla plumbea (Lindl.) Speta, indigenous
- Muscari orchioides (L.) Mill. accepted as Lachenalia orchioides (L.) Aiton, indigenous
- Neobakeria angustifolia (L.f.) Schltr. accepted as Massonia angustifolia L.f. indigenous
- Neobakeria comata (Burch. ex Baker) Schltr. accepted as Daubenya comata (Burch. ex Baker) J.C.Manning & A.M.van der Merwe
- Neobakeria heterandra Isaac, accepted as Massonia pygmaea Kunth subsp. pygmaea
- Neobakeria namaquensis Schltr. accepted as Daubenya namaquensis (Schltr.) J.C.Manning & Goldblatt
- Neopatersonia falcata G.J.Lewis, accepted as Ornithogalum falcatum (G.J.Lewis) J.C.Manning & Goldblatt
- Neopatersonia namaquensis G.J.Lewis, accepted as Ornithogalum filicaule J.C.Manning & Goldblatt
- Neopatersonia uitenhagensis Schonland, accepted as Ornithogalum neopatersonia J.C.Manning & Goldblatt

== Nicipe ==
Genus Nicipe:

- Nicipe lithopsoides (Van Jaarsv.) Mart.-Azorin, M.B.Crespo, A.P.Dold, M.Pinter & Wetschnig, accepted as Ornithogalum juncifolium Jacq. endemic
- Nicipe rosulata Mart.-Azorin, M.B.Crespo, A.P.Dold, M.Pinter & Wetschnig, accepted as Ornithogalum rosulatum (Mart.-Azorin, M.B.Crespo, A.P.Dold, M.Pinter & Wetschnig) J.C.Manning, endemic

== Ornithogalum ==
Genus Ornithogalum:

- Ornithogalum abyssinicum (Jacq.) J.C.Manning & Goldblatt, indigenous
- Ornithogalum acutum J.C.Manning & Goldblatt, accepted as Albuca acuminata Baker, indigenous
- Ornithogalum adseptentrionesvergentulu U.Mull.-Doblies & D.Mull.-Doblies, endemic
- Ornithogalum aetfatense U.Mull.-Doblies & D.Mull.-Doblies, endemic
- Ornithogalum albanense J.C.Manning & Goldblatt, accepted as Albuca longifolia Baker, endemic
- Ornithogalum anguinum F.M.Leight. ex Oberm. endemic
- Ornithogalum apertum (I.Verd.) Oberm. accepted as Albuca concordiana Baker
- Ornithogalum aristatum J.C.Manning & Goldblatt, accepted as Albuca caudata Jacq. indigenous
- Ornithogalum auratum J.C.Manning & Goldblatt, accepted as Albuca aurea Jacq. endemic
- Ornithogalum autumnulum U.Mull.-Doblies & D.Mull.-Doblies, accepted as Albuca autumnula (U.Mull.-Doblies & D.Mull.-Doblies) J.C.Manning & Goldblatt, endemic
- Ornithogalum bakerianum (Bolus) J.C.Manning & Goldblatt, accepted as Dipcadi bakerianum Bolus, indigenous
- Ornithogalum battenianum (Hilliard & B.L.Burtt) J.C.Manning & Goldblatt, accepted as Albuca batteniana Hilliard & B.L.Burtt, endemic
- Ornithogalum baurii (Baker) J.C.Manning & Goldblatt, accepted as Albuca baurii Baker, indigenous
  - Ornithogalum baurii Baker, endemic
- Ornithogalum bicornutum F.M.Leight. endemic
- Ornithogalum bifoliatum (R.A.Dyer) J.C.Manning & Goldblatt, accepted as Albuca bifoliata R.A.Dyer, endemic
- Ornithogalum britteniae F.M.Leight. ex Oberm. endemic
- Ornithogalum brucebayeri U.Mull.-Doblies & D.Mull.-Doblies, accepted as Albuca obtusa J.C.Manning & Goldblatt, endemic
- Ornithogalum campanulatum U.Mull.-Doblies & D.Mull.-Doblies, endemic
- Ornithogalum candicans (Baker) J.C.Manning & Goldblatt, indigenous
- Ornithogalum candidum Oberm. accepted as Albuca candida (Oberm.) J.C.Manning & Goldblatt
- Ornithogalum capillare J.M.Wood & M.S.Evans, indigenous
- Ornithogalum ceresianum F.M.Leight. indigenous
- Ornithogalum ciliiferum U.Mull.-Doblies & D.Mull.-Doblies, endemic
- Ornithogalum circinatum J.C.Manning & Goldblatt, accepted as Albuca spiralis L.f. endemic
- Ornithogalum clanwilliamae-gloria J.C.Manning & Goldblatt, accepted as Albuca clanwilliamaegloria U.Mull.-Doblies, endemic
- Ornithogalum clavatum (Mast.) J.C.Manning & Goldblatt, accepted as Pseudogaltonia clavata (Mast.) E.Phillips, indigenous
- Ornithogalum concordianum (Baker) U.Mull.-Doblies & D.Mull.-Doblies, accepted as Albuca concordiana Baker, indigenous
- Ornithogalum conicum Jacq. indigenous
  - Ornithogalum conicum Jacq. subsp. conicum, accepted as Ornithogalum conicum Jacq. indigenous
  - Ornithogalum conicum Jacq. subsp. strictum (L.Bolus) Oberm. accepted as Ornithogalum strictum L.Bolus, endemic
- Ornithogalum constrictum F.M.Leight. endemic
- Ornithogalum cooperi (Baker) J.C.Manning & Goldblatt, accepted as Albuca cooperi Baker, indigenous
- Ornithogalum corticatum Mart.-Azorin, endemic
- Ornithogalum costatulum U.Mull.-Doblies & D.Mull.-Doblies, accepted as Albuca costatula (U.Mull.-Doblies & D.Mull.-Doblies) J.C.Manning & Goldblatt
- Ornithogalum craibii (Mart.-Azorin, M.B.Crespo, M.Pinter & Wetschnig) J.C.Manning, endemic
- Ornithogalum cremnophilum (Van Jaarsv. & A.E.van Wyk) J.C.Manning & Goldblatt, accepted as Albuca cremnophila Van Jaarsv. & A.E.van Wyk, endemic
- Ornithogalum crinifolium (Baker) J.C.Manning & Goldblatt, accepted as Albuca crinifolia Baker, endemic
- Ornithogalum crispifolium F.M.Leight. accepted as Ornithogalum graminifolium Thunb.
- Ornithogalum crispum (Baker) J.C.Manning & Goldblatt, accepted as Dipcadi crispum Baker, indigenous
- Ornithogalum crudenii (Archibald) J.C.Manning & Goldblatt, accepted as Albuca crudenii Archibald, endemic
- Ornithogalum dalyae (Baker) J.C.Manning & Goldblatt, accepted as Albuca dalyae Baker, endemic
- Ornithogalum decipiens (U.Mull.-Doblies) J.C.Manning & Goldblatt, accepted as Albuca decipiens U.Mull.-Doblies, endemic
- Ornithogalum decusmontium G.Will. endemic
- Ornithogalum deltoideum Baker, indigenous
- Ornithogalum diluculum Oberm. accepted as Albuca dilucula (Oberm.) J.C.Manning & Goldblatt, endemic
- Ornithogalum dipcadioides Baker, accepted as Dipcadi gracillimum Baker, indigenous
- Ornithogalum diphyllum Baker, endemic
- Ornithogalum dividens J.C.Manning & Goldblatt, accepted as Albuca paradoxa Dinter, indigenous
- Ornithogalum dolichopharynx U.Mull.-Doblies & D.Mull.-Doblies, endemic
- Ornithogalum drakensbergense J.C.Manning & Goldblatt, accepted as Albuca rupestris Hilliard & B.L.Burtt, indigenous
- Ornithogalum dregeanum Kunth, endemic
- Ornithogalum dubium Houtt. endemic
- Ornithogalum durandianum (Schinz) J.C.Manning & Goldblatt, accepted as Dipcadi marlothii Engl. indigenous
- Ornithogalum echinospermum (U.Mull.-Doblies) J.C.Manning & Goldblatt, accepted as Albuca echinosperma U.Mull.-Doblies, endemic
- Ornithogalum esterhuyseniae Oberm. endemic
- Ornithogalum etesiogaripense U.Mull.-Doblies & D.Mull.-Doblies, accepted as Albuca deserticola J.C.Manning & Goldblatt subsp. deserticola
  - Ornithogalum etesiogaripense U.Mull.-Doblies & D.Mull.-Doblies subsp. longipilosum U.Mull.-Doblies &, accepted as Albuca deserticola J.C.Manning & Goldblatt subsp. longipilosa (U.Mull.-Doblies & D.Mull.-Doblies) J.
- Ornithogalum exuviatum (Baker) J.C.Manning & Goldblatt, accepted as Albuca exuviata Baker, indigenous
- Ornithogalum falcatum (G.J.Lewis) J.C.Manning & Goldblatt, indigenous
- Ornithogalum fastigiatum (Dryand.) J.C.Manning & Goldblatt, accepted as Albuca fastigiata Dryand. var. fastigiata, endemic
- Ornithogalum filicaule J.C.Manning & Goldblatt, endemic
- Ornithogalum fimbrifolium J.C.Manning & Goldblatt, accepted as Albuca ciliaris U.Mull.-Doblies, endemic
- Ornithogalum fimbrimarginatum F.M.Leight. accepted as Ornithogalum dubium Houtt. endemic
- Ornithogalum flaccidum (Jacq.) J.C.Manning & Goldblatt, accepted as Albuca flaccida Jacq. endemic
- Ornithogalum flexuosum (Thunb.) U.Mull.-Doblies & D.Mull.-Doblies, indigenous
- Ornithogalum foetidum (U.Mull.-Doblies) J.C.Manning & Goldblatt, accepted as Albuca foetida U.Mull.-Doblies, endemic
- Ornithogalum fragrans (Jacq.) J.C.Manning & Goldblatt, accepted as Albuca fragrans Jacq. endemic
- Ornithogalum galpinii Baker, accepted as Ornithogalum tenuifolium F.Delaroche subsp. tenuifolium
- Ornithogalum geniculatum Oberm. indigenous
- Ornithogalum gethylloides U.Mull.-Doblies & D.Mull.-Doblies, accepted as Albuca gethylloides (U.Mull.-Doblies & D.Mull.-Doblies) J.C.Manning & Goldblatt, endemic
- Ornithogalum gifbergense U.Mull.-Doblies & D.Mull.-Doblies, indigenous
- Ornithogalum gildenhuysii Van Jaarsv. accepted as Albuca gildenhuysii (Van Jaarsv.) Van Jaarsv. endemic
- Ornithogalum glanduliferum J.C.Manning & Goldblatt, accepted as Albuca glandulosa Baker, endemic
- Ornithogalum glandulosum Oberm. accepted as Albuca glandulifera J.C.Manning & Goldblatt, indigenous
- Ornithogalum glaucescens J.C.Manning & Goldblatt, accepted as Albuca glauca Baker, indigenous
- Ornithogalum glaucifolium U.Mull.-Doblies & D.Mull.-Doblies, accepted as Albuca glaucifolia (U.Mull.-Doblies & D.Mull.-Doblies) J.C.Manning & Goldblatt, endemic
- Ornithogalum goswinii (U.Mull.-Doblies) J.C.Manning & Goldblatt, accepted as Albuca goswinii U.Mull.-Doblies, endemic
- Ornithogalum graminifolium Thunb. indigenous
- Ornithogalum gregorianum U.Mull.-Doblies & D.Mull.-Doblies, endemic
- Ornithogalum hallii (U.Mull.-Doblies) J.C.Manning & Goldblatt, accepted as Albuca hallii U.Mull.-Doblies, indigenous
  - Ornithogalum hallii Oberm. endemic
- Ornithogalum hesperanthum U.Mull.-Doblies & D.Mull.-Doblies, endemic
- Ornithogalum hesquaspoortense (U.Mull.-Doblies) J.C.Manning & Goldblatt, accepted as Albuca hesquaspoortensis U.Mull.-Doblies, endemic
- Ornithogalum hispidulum U.Mull.-Doblies & D.Mull.-Doblies, endemic
- Ornithogalum hispidum Hornem. indigenous
  - Ornithogalum hispidum Hornem. subsp. bergii (Schltdl.) Oberm. endemic
  - Ornithogalum hispidum Hornem. subsp. hispidum, indigenous
- Ornithogalum humile (Baker) J.C.Manning & Goldblatt, accepted as Albuca humilis Baker, indigenous
- Ornithogalum hyacinthiflorum Bergius ex Schltdl. accepted as Dipcadi brevifolium (Thunb.) Fourc. indigenous
- Ornithogalum imbricatum (F.M.Leight.) J.C.Manning & Goldblatt, accepted as Albuca juncifolia Baker, endemic
- Ornithogalum inclusum F.M.Leight. endemic
- Ornithogalum juncifolium Jacq. indigenous
  - Ornithogalum juncifolium Jacq. var. emmsii Van Jaarsv. & A.E.van Wyk, endemic
  - Ornithogalum juncifolium Jacq. var. juncifolium, indigenous
- Ornithogalum karachabpoortense U.Mull.-Doblies & D.Mull.-Doblies, accepted as Albuca karachabpoortensis (U.Mull.-Doblies & D.Mull.-Doblies) J.C.Manning & Goldblatt, endemic
- Ornithogalum kirstenii J.C.Manning & Goldblatt, accepted as Albuca kirstenii (J.C.Manning & Goldblatt) J.C.Manning & Goldblatt
- Ornithogalum knersvlaktense U.Mull.-Doblies & D.Mull.-Doblies, accepted as Albuca knersvlaktensis (U.Mull.-Doblies & D.Mull.-Doblies) J.C.Manning & Goldblatt, endemic
- Ornithogalum lanatum J.C.Manning & Goldblatt, accepted as Albuca villosa U.Mull.-Doblies subsp. villosa, endemic
- Ornithogalum leeupoortense U.Mull.-Doblies & D.Mull.-Doblies, endemic
- Ornithogalum leucanthum (U.Mull.-Doblies) J.C.Manning & Goldblatt, accepted as Albuca leucantha U.Mull.-Doblies, endemic
- Ornithogalum lithopsoides Van Jaarsv. accepted as Ornithogalum juncifolium Jacq. endemic
- Ornithogalum longibracteatum Jacq. accepted as Albuca bracteata (Thunb.) J.C.Manning & Goldblatt, indigenous
- Ornithogalum longicollum U.Mull.-Doblies & D.Mull.-Doblies, endemic
- Ornithogalum longifolium (Baker) J.C.Manning & Goldblatt, accepted as Albuca longifolia Baker, indigenous
- Ornithogalum longifolium (Ker Gawl.) J.C.Manning & Goldblatt, accepted as Dipcadi longifolium (Ker Gawl.) Baker, indigenous
- Ornithogalum longipes (Baker) J.C.Manning & Goldblatt, accepted as Albuca longipes Baker, endemic
- Ornithogalum macowanii (Baker) J.C.Manning & Goldblatt, accepted as Albuca macowanii Baker, endemic
- Ornithogalum maculatum Jacq. endemic
- Ornithogalum magnum (Baker) J.C.Manning & Goldblatt, accepted as Dipcadi magnum Baker, indigenous
- Ornithogalum marlothii F.M.Leight. accepted as Ornithogalum hispidum Hornem. subsp. hispidum
- Ornithogalum mater-familias U.Mull.-Doblies & D.Mull.-Doblies, endemic
- Ornithogalum maximum (Burm.f.) J.C.Manning & Goldblatt, accepted as Albuca canadensis (L.) F.M.Leight. indigenous
- Ornithogalum merxmuelleri Roessler, accepted as Ornithogalum puberulum Oberm.
- Ornithogalum monarchos U.Mull.-Doblies & D.Mull.-Doblies, accepted as Albuca monarchos (U.Mull.-Doblies & D.Mull.-Doblies) J.C.Manning & Goldblatt, endemic
- Ornithogalum monophyllum Baker, indigenous
  - Ornithogalum monophyllum Baker subsp. eckardtianum U.Mull.-Doblies & D.Mull.-Doblies, endemic
  - Ornithogalum monophyllum Baker subsp. monophyllum, indigenous
- Ornithogalum monticola J.C.Manning & Goldblatt, accepted as Albuca collina Baker, endemic
- Ornithogalum moylei J.C.Manning & Goldblatt, accepted as Albuca rogersii Schonland, endemic
- Ornithogalum multifolium Baker, accepted as Ornithogalum rupestre L.f. endemic
- Ornithogalum namaquanulum U.Mull.-Doblies & D.Mull.-Doblies, endemic
- Ornithogalum namaquense (Baker) J.C.Manning & Goldblatt, accepted as Albuca namaquensis Baker, indigenous
- Ornithogalum nannodes F.M.Leight. indigenous
- Ornithogalum nathoanum U.Mull.-Doblies & D.Mull.-Doblies, accepted as Albuca nathoana (U.Mull.-Doblies & D.Mull.-Doblies) J.C.Manning & Goldblatt, endemic
- Ornithogalum naviculum W.F.Barker, endemic
- Ornithogalum nelsonii (N.E.Br.) J.C.Manning & Goldblatt, accepted as Albuca nelsonii N.E.Br. endemic
- Ornithogalum neopatersonia J.C.Manning & Goldblatt, endemic
- Ornithogalum niveum Aiton, endemic
- Ornithogalum oostachyum Baker, accepted as Ornithogalum paludosum Baker
- Ornithogalum oreogenes Schltr. ex Poelln. endemic
- Ornithogalum ornithogaloides (Kunth) Oberm. accepted as Ornithogalum flexuosum (Thunb.) U.Mull.-Doblies & D.Mull.-Doblies
- Ornithogalum osmynellum U.Mull.-Doblies & D.Mull.-Doblies, accepted as Albuca osmynella (U.Mull.-Doblies & D.Mull.-Doblies) J.C.Manning & Goldblatt, endemic
- Ornithogalum ovatum Thunb. accepted as Albuca ovata (Thunb.) J.C.Manning & Goldblatt
  - Ornithogalum ovatum Thunb. subsp. oliverorum U.Mull.-Doblies & D.Mull.-Doblies, accepted as Albuca ovata (Thunb.) J.C.Manning & Goldblatt, endemic
- Ornithogalum paludosum Baker, indigenous
- Ornithogalum papillatum (Oberm.) J.C.Manning & Goldblatt, accepted as Dipcadi papillatum Oberm. indigenous
- Ornithogalum papyraceum (J.C.Manning & Goldblatt) J.C.Manning & Goldblatt, accepted as Albuca papyracea J.C.Manning & Goldblatt, endemic
- Ornithogalum paucifolium U.Mull.-Doblies & D.Mull.-Doblies, accepted as Albuca paucifolia (U.Mull.-Doblies & D.Mull.-Doblies) J.C.Manning & Goldblatt subsp. paucifolia
  - Ornithogalum paucifolium U.Mull.-Doblies & D.Mull.-Doblies subsp. karooparkense U.Mull.-Doblies & D. accepted as Albuca paucifolia (U.Mull.-Doblies & D.Mull.-Doblies) J.C.Manning & Goldblatt subsp. karooparkensis, endemic
- Ornithogalum pearsonii F.M.Leight. accepted as Albuca pearsonii (F.M.Leight.) J.C.Manning & Goldblatt, indigenous
- Ornithogalum pendens Van Jaarsv. endemic
- Ornithogalum pendulinum U.Mull.-Doblies & D.Mull.-Doblies, accepted as Albuca pendulina (U.Mull.-Doblies & D.Mull.-Doblies) J.C.Manning & Goldblatt
- Ornithogalum pentheri Zahlbr. accepted as Albuca pentheri (Zahlbr.) J.C.Manning & Goldblatt, endemic
- Ornithogalum perdurans A.P.Dold & S.A.Hammer, endemic
- Ornithogalum perparvum Poelln. endemic
- Ornithogalum petraeum Fourc. endemic
- Ornithogalum pilosum L.f. endemic
  - Ornithogalum pilosum L.f. subsp. pullatum (F.M.Leight.) Oberm. accepted as Ornithogalum pullatum F.M.Leight.
- Ornithogalum planifolium J.C.Manning & Goldblatt, accepted as Dipcadi platyphyllum Baker, indigenous
- Ornithogalum polyodontulum U.Mull.-Doblies & D.Mull.-Doblies, accepted as Albuca polyodontula (U.Mull.-Doblies & D.Mull.-Doblies) J.C.Manning & Goldblatt
- Ornithogalum polyphyllum Jacq. accepted as Albuca consanguinea (Kunth) J.C.Manning & Goldblatt, endemic
- Ornithogalum prasinum Ker Gawl. accepted as Albuca prasina (Ker Gawl.) J.C.Manning & Goldblatt
- Ornithogalum prasinum Lindl. indigenous
- Ornithogalum princeps (Baker) J.C.Manning & Goldblatt, endemic
- Ornithogalum pruinosum F.M.Leight. indigenous
- Ornithogalum psammophorum U.Mull.-Doblies & D.Mull.-Doblies, accepted as Albuca psammophora (U.Mull.-Doblies & D.Mull.-Doblies) J.C.Manning & Goldblatt, endemic
- Ornithogalum puberulum Oberm. indigenous
  - Ornithogalum puberulum Oberm. subsp. chris-bayeri U.Mull.-Doblies & D.Mull.-Doblies, accepted as Ornithogalum puberulum Oberm.
  - Ornithogalum puberulum Oberm. subsp. puberulum, accepted as Ornithogalum puberulum Oberm.
- Ornithogalum pulchrum Schinz, accepted as Albuca pulchra (Schinz) J.C.Manning & Goldblatt
- Ornithogalum pullatum F.M.Leight. endemic
- Ornithogalum rautanenii Schinz, accepted as Albuca rautanenii (Schinz) J.C.Manning & Goldblatt
- Ornithogalum readii (Baker) J.C.Manning & Goldblatt, accepted as Dipcadi readii (Baker) Baker, endemic
- Ornithogalum regale (Hilliard & B.L.Burtt) J.C.Manning & Goldblatt, indigenous
- Ornithogalum richtersveldensis Van Jaarsv. endemic
- Ornithogalum rigidifolium (Baker) J.C.Manning & Goldblatt, accepted as Dipcadi rigidifolium Baker, indigenous
- Ornithogalum robertsonianum (U.Mull.-Doblies) J.C.Manning & Goldblatt, accepted as Albuca robertsoniana U.Mull.-Doblies, endemic
- Ornithogalum rogersii Baker, endemic
- Ornithogalum rossouwii U.Mull.-Doblies & D.Mull.-Doblies, accepted as Ornithogalum maculatum Jacq. endemic
- Ornithogalum rosulatum (Mart.-Azorin, M.B.Crespo, A.P.Dold, M.Pinter & Wetschnig) J.C.Manning, endemic
- Ornithogalum rotatum U.Mull.-Doblies & D.Mull.-Doblies, endemic
- Ornithogalum rubescens F.M.Leight. endemic
- Ornithogalum rupestre L.f. endemic
- Ornithogalum sabulosum U.Mull.-Doblies & D.Mull.-Doblies, accepted as Albuca sabulosa (U.Mull.-Doblies & D.Mull.-Doblies) J.C.Manning & Goldblatt, endemic
- Ornithogalum sardienii Van Jaarsv. endemic
- Ornithogalum saundersiae Baker, indigenous
- Ornithogalum saxatilis J.C.Manning & Goldblatt, accepted as Albuca massonii Baker, endemic
- Ornithogalum scabrocostatum U.Mull.-Doblies & D.Mull.-Doblies, accepted as Albuca scabrocostata (U.Mull.-Doblies & D.Mull.-Doblies) J.C.Manning & Goldblatt, endemic
- Ornithogalum schlechteri (Baker) J.C.Manning & Goldblatt, accepted as Albuca schlechteri Baker, endemic
- Ornithogalum schlechterianum Schinz, endemic
- Ornithogalum schoenlandii (Baker) J.C.Manning & Goldblatt, accepted as Albuca schoenlandii Baker, endemic
- Ornithogalum secundum Jacq. accepted as Albuca secunda (Jacq.) J.C.Manning & Goldblatt, endemic
- Ornithogalum seineri (Engl. & K.Krause) Oberm. accepted as Albuca seineri (Engl. & K.Krause) J.C.Manning & Goldblatt, indigenous
- Ornithogalum semipedale (Baker) U.Mull.-Doblies & D.Mull.-Doblies, accepted as Albuca semipedalis Baker, endemic
- Ornithogalum sephtonii Hilliard & B.L.Burtt, endemic
- Ornithogalum setosum (Jacq.) J.C.Manning & Goldblatt, accepted as Albuca setosa Jacq. indigenous
- Ornithogalum shawii (Baker) J.C.Manning & Goldblatt, accepted as Albuca shawii Baker, indigenous
- Ornithogalum simile J.C.Manning & Goldblatt, accepted as Albuca affinis Baker, endemic
- Ornithogalum stapfii Schinz, accepted as Albuca stapfii (Schinz) J.C.Manning & Goldblatt
- Ornithogalum strictum L.Bolus, indigenous
- Ornithogalum strigulosum U.Mull.-Doblies & D.Mull.-Doblies, accepted as Albuca strigulosa (U.Mull.-Doblies & D.Mull.-Doblies) J.C.Manning & Goldblatt
- Ornithogalum stuetzelianum U.Mull.-Doblies & D.Mull.-Doblies, accepted as Albuca stuetzeliana (U.Mull.-Doblies & D.Mull.-Doblies) J.C.Manning & Goldblatt, indigenous
- Ornithogalum suaveolens Jacq. accepted as Albuca suaveolens (Jacq.) J.C.Manning & Goldblatt, indigenous
- Ornithogalum subcoriaceum L.Bolus, accepted as Ornithogalum dubium Houtt. indigenous
- Ornithogalum subglandulosum U.Mull.-Doblies & D.Mull.-Doblies, accepted as Albuca subglandulosa (U.Mull.-Doblies & D.Mull.-Doblies) J.C.Manning & Goldblatt, endemic
- Ornithogalum synadelphicum U.Mull.-Doblies & D.Mull.-Doblies, endemic
- Ornithogalum synanthifolium F.M.Leight. indigenous
- Ornithogalum tanquanum (Mart.-Azorin & M.B.Crespo) J.C.Manning & Goldblatt, endemic
- Ornithogalum tenuifolium F.Delaroche, indigenous
  - Ornithogalum tenuifolium F.Delaroche subsp. aridum Oberm. accepted as Albuca virens (Ker Gawl.) J.C.Manning & Goldblatt subsp. arida (Oberm.) J.C.Manning & Goldblatt, indigenous
  - Ornithogalum tenuifolium F.Delaroche subsp. tenuifolium, indigenous
- Ornithogalum teretifolium J.C.Manning & Goldblatt, accepted as Albuca polyphylla Baker, indigenous
- Ornithogalum thermarum (Van Jaarsv.) J.C.Manning & Goldblatt, accepted as Albuca thermarum Van Jaarsv. endemic
- Ornithogalum thermophilum F.M.Leight. endemic
- Ornithogalum thunbergianulum U.Mull.-Doblies & D.Mull.-Doblies, endemic
- Ornithogalum thyrsoides Jacq. endemic
- Ornithogalum tortile J.C.Manning & Goldblatt, accepted as Albuca tortuosa Baker, endemic
- Ornithogalum tortuosum Baker, endemic
- Ornithogalum toxicarium C.Archer & R.H.Archer, accepted as Albuca toxicaria (C.Archer & R.H.Archer) J.C.Manning & Goldblatt, indigenous
- Ornithogalum trachyphyllum (U.Mull.-Doblies) J.C.Manning & Goldblatt, accepted as Albuca trachyphylla U.Mull.-Doblies, endemic
- Ornithogalum tubiforme (Oberm.) Oberm. accepted as Albuca tubiformis (Oberm.) J.C.Manning & Goldblatt
- Ornithogalum uitenhagense (Schonland) J.C.Manning & Goldblatt, accepted as Ornithogalum neopatersonia J.C.Manning & Goldblatt, endemic
- Ornithogalum unifoliatum (G.D.Rowley) Oberm. accepted as Albuca unifoliata G.D.Rowley, endemic
- Ornithogalum unifolium Retz. accepted as Albuca unifolia (Retz.) J.C.Manning & Goldblatt
  - Ornithogalum unifolium Retz. var. vestitum U.Mull.-Doblies & D.Mull.-Doblies, accepted as Albuca unifolia (Retz.) J.C.Manning & Goldblatt, endemic
- Ornithogalum vaginatum (Baker) J.C.Manning & Goldblatt, accepted as Dipcadi vaginatum Baker, indigenous
- Ornithogalum vallis-gratiae Schltr. ex Poelln. endemic
- Ornithogalum verae U.Mull.-Doblies & D.Mull.-Doblies, endemic
- Ornithogalum viridiflorum (I.Verd.) J.C.Manning & Goldblatt, indigenous
- Ornithogalum viscosum (L.f.) J.C.Manning & Goldblatt, accepted as Albuca viscosa L.f. indigenous
- Ornithogalum weberlingiorum (U.Mull.-Doblies) J.C.Manning & Goldblatt, accepted as Albuca weberlingiorum U.Mull.-Doblies, endemic
- Ornithogalum wilsonii J.C.Manning & Goldblatt, accepted as Albuca corymbosa Baker, endemic
- Ornithogalum xanthochlorum Baker, endemic
- Ornithogalum xanthocodon (Hilliard & B.L.Burtt) J.C.Manning & Goldblatt, accepted as Albuca xanthocodon Hilliard & B.L.Burtt, endemic
- Ornithogalum zebrinellum U.Mull.-Doblies & D.Mull.-Doblies, endemic
- Ornithogalum zebrinum (Baker) Oberm. accepted as Albuca zebrina Baker, endemic

== Periboea ==
Genus Periboea:

- Periboea corymbosa (L.) Kunth, accepted as Lachenalia corymbosa (L.) J.C.Manning & Goldblatt, indigenous
- Periboea gawleri Kunth, accepted as Lachenalia corymbosa (L.) J.C.Manning & Goldblatt, indigenous
- Periboea oliveri U.Mull.-Doblies & D.Mull.-Doblies, accepted as Lachenalia paucifolia (W.F.Barker) J.C.Manning & Goldblatt, indigenous
- Periboea paucifolia (W.F.Barker) U.Mull.-Doblies & D.Mull.-Doblies, accepted as Lachenalia paucifolia (W.F.Barker) J.C.Manning & Goldblatt, indigenous

== Polyanthes ==
Genus Polyanthes:

- Polyanthes pygmaea Jacq. accepted as Lachenalia pygmaea (Jacq.) G.D.Duncan, indigenous

== Polyxena ==
Genus Polyxena:

- Polyxena angustifolia (L.f.) Baker, accepted as Massonia angustifolia L.f. indigenous
- Polyxena bakeri T.Durand & Schinz, accepted as Massonia echinata L.f. indigenous
- Polyxena burchellii (Baker) Baker, accepted as Daubenya zeyheri (Kunth) J.C.Manning & A.M.van der Merwe, indigenous
- Polyxena calcicola U.Mull.-Doblies & D.Mull.-Doblies, accepted as Lachenalia calcicola (U.Mull.-Doblies & D.Mull.-Doblies) G.D.Duncan, indigenous
- Polyxena comata (Burch. ex Baker) Baker, accepted as Daubenya comata (Burch. ex Baker) J.C.Manning & A.M.van der Merwe, indigenous
- Polyxena corymbosa (L.) Jessop, accepted as Lachenalia corymbosa (L.) J.C.Manning & Goldblatt, indigenous
- Polyxena ensifolia (Thunb.) Schonland, accepted as Lachenalia ensifolia (Thunb.) J.C.Manning & Goldblatt, indigenous
- Polyxena haemanthoides Baker, accepted as Daubenya marginata (Willd. ex Kunth) J.C.Manning & A.M.van der Merwe, indigenous
- Polyxena longituba A.M.van der Merwe, accepted as Lachenalia longituba (A.M.van der Merwe) J.C.Manning & Goldblatt, indigenous
- Polyxena marginata (Willd. ex Kunth) Baker, accepted as Daubenya marginata (Willd. ex Kunth) J.C.Manning & A.M.van der Merwe, indigenous
- Polyxena maughanii W.F.Barker, accepted as Lachenalia ensifolia (Thunb.) J.C.Manning & Goldblatt subsp. maughanii (W.F.Barker) G.D.Duncan, indigenous
- Polyxena odorata (Hook.f.) Baker, accepted as Lachenalia ensifolia (Thunb.) J.C.Manning & Goldblatt, indigenous
  - Polyxena odorata (Hook.f.) W.A.Nicholson, accepted as Lachenalia ensifolia (Thunb.) J.C.Manning & Goldblatt, indigenous
- Polyxena paucifolia (W.F.Barker) A.M.van der Merwe & J.C.Manning, accepted as Lachenalia paucifolia (W.F.Barker) J.C.Manning & Goldblatt, indigenous
- Polyxena pusilla (Jacq.) Schltr. accepted as Lachenalia pusilla Jacq. indigenous
- Polyxena pygmaea (Jacq.) Kunth, accepted as Lachenalia pygmaea (Jacq.) G.D.Duncan, indigenous
- Polyxena rugulosa (Licht. ex Kunth) Baker, accepted as Daubenya marginata (Willd. ex Kunth) J.C.Manning & A.M.van der Merwe, indigenous
- Polyxena uniflora (Sol. ex Baker) Benth. & Hook. ex Durand & Schinz, accepted as Lachenalia ensifolia (Thunb.) J.C.Manning & Goldblatt, indigenous

== Pseudogaltonia ==
Genus Pseudogaltonia:

- Pseudogaltonia clavata (Mast.) E.Phillips, indigenous
- Pseudogaltonia liliiflora J.C.Manning & Goldblatt, endemic

== Pseudoprospero ==
Genus Pseudoprospero:

- Pseudoprospero firmifolium (Baker) Speta, endemic
  - Pseudoprospero firmifolium (Baker) Speta subsp. firmifolium, endemic
  - Pseudoprospero firmifolium (Baker) Speta subsp. natalensis J.C.Manning, endemic

== Resnova ==
Genus Resnova:

- Resnova humifusa (Baker) U.Mull.-Doblies & D.Mull.-Doblies, accepted as Ledebouria humifusa (Baker) J.C.Manning & Goldblatt
- Resnova lachenalioides (Baker) Van der Merwe, accepted as Ledebouria lachenalioides (Baker) J.C.Manning & Goldblatt
- Resnova maxima Van der Merwe, accepted as Ledebouria maxima (Van der Merwe) J.C.Manning & Goldblatt
- Resnova megaphylla Hankey ex J.M.H.Shaw, accepted as Ledebouria megaphylla (Hankey ex J.M.H.Shaw) Van Jaarsv. & Eggli, indigenous
- Resnova minor Van der Merwe, accepted as Ledebouria minor (Van der Merwe) J.C.Manning & Goldblatt
- Resnova pilosa Van der Merwe, accepted as Ledebouria pilosa (Van der Merwe) J.C.Manning & Goldblatt
- Resnova transvaalensis Van der Merwe, accepted as Ledebouria transvaalensis (Van der Merwe) J.C.Manning & Goldblatt, indigenous

== Rhadamanthus ==
Genus Rhadamanthus:

- Rhadamanthus albiflorus B.Nord. accepted as Drimia albiflora (B.Nord.) J.C.Manning & Goldblatt
- Rhadamanthus arenicola B.Nord. accepted as Drimia arenicola (B.Nord.) J.C.Manning & Goldblatt
- Rhadamanthus convallarioides (L.f.) Baker, accepted as Drimia convallarioides (L.f.) J.C.Manning & Goldblatt
- Rhadamanthus cyanelloides Baker, accepted as Drimia cyanelloides (Baker) J.C.Manning & Goldblatt
- Rhadamanthus fasciatus B.Nord. accepted as Drimia fasciata (B.Nord.) J.C.Manning & Goldblatt
- Rhadamanthus involutus J.C.Manning & Snijman, accepted as Drimia involuta (J.C.Manning & Snijman) J.C.Manning & Goldblatt
- Rhadamanthus karrooicus Oberm. accepted as Drimia karooica (Oberm.) J.C.Manning & Goldblatt
- Rhadamanthus montanus B.Nord. accepted as Drimia convallarioides (L.f.) J.C.Manning & Goldblatt
- Rhadamanthus namibensis Oberm. accepted as Drimia namibensis (Oberm.) J.C.Manning & Goldblatt
- Rhadamanthus platyphyllus B.Nord. accepted as Drimia platyphylla (B.Nord.) J.C.Manning & Goldblatt
- Rhadamanthus secundus B.Nord. accepted as Drimia secunda (B.Nord.) J.C.Manning & Goldblatt
- Rhadamanthus urantherus R.A.Dyer, accepted as Drimia uranthera (R.A.Dyer) J.C.Manning & Goldblatt

== Schizobasis ==
Genus Schizobasis:

- Schizobasis intricata (Baker) Baker, accepted as Drimia intricata (Baker) J.C.Manning & Goldblatt

== Schizocarphus ==
Genus Schizocarphus:

- Schizocarphus nervosus (Burch.) Van der Merwe, indigenous

== Scilla ==
Genus Scilla:

- Scilla adlamii Baker, accepted as Ledebouria cooperi (Hook.f.) Jessop
- Scilla brachyphylla Roem. & J.H.Schult. accepted as Lachenalia corymbosa (L.) J.C.Manning & Goldblatt, indigenous
- Scilla brevifolia Ker Gawl. accepted as Lachenalia corymbosa (L.) J.C.Manning & Goldblatt, indigenous
- Scilla corymbosa (L.) Ker Gawl. accepted as Lachenalia corymbosa (L.) J.C.Manning & Goldblatt, indigenous
- Scilla dracomontana Hilliard & B.L.Burtt, accepted as Merwilla dracomontana (Hilliard & B.L.Burtt) Speta
- Scilla ensifolia (Eckl.) Britten, accepted as Ledebouria ensifolia (Eckl.) S.Venter & T.J.Edwards
- Scilla firmifolia Baker, accepted as Pseudoprospero firmifolium (Baker) Speta subsp. firmifolium
- Scilla kraussii Baker, accepted as Merwilla kraussii (Baker) Speta
- Scilla natalensis Planch. accepted as Merwilla plumbea (Lindl.) Speta
- Scilla nervosa (Burch.) Jessop, accepted as Schizocarphus nervosus (Burch.) Van der Merwe
- Scilla plumbea Lindl. accepted as Merwilla plumbea (Lindl.) Speta

== Spetaea ==
Genus Spetaea:

- Spetaea lachenaliiflora Wetschnig & Pfosser, endemic

== Stellarioides ==
Genus Stellarioides:

- Stellarioides exigua Mart.-Azorin, M.B.Crespo, A.P.Dold, M.Pinter & Wetschnig, accepted as Albuca exigua (Mart.-Azorin, M.B.Crespo, A.P.Dold, M.Pinter & Wetschnig) J.C.Manning, endemic
- Stellarioides littoralis N.R.Crouch, D.Styles, A.J.Beaumont & Mart.-Azorin, accepted as Albuca littoralis (N.R.Crouch, D.Styles, A.J.Beaumont & Mart.-Azorin) J.C.Manning, endemic

== Tenicroa ==
Genus Tenicroa:

- Tenicroa exuviata (Jacq.) Speta, accepted as Drimia exuviata (Jacq.) Jessop
- Tenicroa filifolia (Jacq.) Oberm. accepted as Drimia filifolia (Jacq.) J.C.Manning & Goldblatt
- Tenicroa fragrans (Jacq.) Raf. accepted as Drimia fragrans (Jacq.) J.C.Manning & Goldblatt
- Tenicroa multifolia (G.J.Lewis) Oberm. accepted as Drimia multifolia (G.J.Lewis) Jessop
- Tenicroa nana Snijman, accepted as Drimia nana (Snijman) J.C.Manning & Goldblatt

== Thuranthos ==
Genus Thuranthos:

- Thuranthos basuticum (E.Phillips) Oberm. accepted as Drimia angustifolia Baker
- Thuranthos macranthum (Baker) C.H.Wright, accepted as Drimia macrantha (Baker) Baker
- Thuranthos nocturnale R.A.Dyer, accepted as Drimia macrantha (Baker) Baker

== Trimelopter ==
Genus Trimelopter:

- Trimelopter craibii Mart.-Azorin, M.B.Crespo & A.P.Dold, accepted as Albuca craibii (Mart.-Azorin, M.B.Crespo & A.P.Dold) J.C.Manning & Goldblatt, endemic

== Urginea ==
Genus Urginea:

- Urginea altissima (L.f.) Baker, accepted as Drimia altissima (L.f.) Ker Gawl.
- Urginea calcarata (Baker) Hilliard & B.L.Burtt, accepted as Drimia calcarata (Baker) Stedje
- Urginea capitata (Hook.) Baker, accepted as Drimia depressa (Baker) Jessop
- Urginea ciliata (L.f.) Baker, accepted as Drimia ciliata (L.f.) J.C.Manning & Goldblatt
- Urginea delagoensis Baker, accepted as Drimia delagoensis (Baker) Jessop
- Urginea depressa Baker, accepted as Drimia depressa (Baker) Jessop
- Urginea dregei Baker, accepted as Drimia dregei (Baker) J.C.Manning & Goldblatt
- Urginea epigea R.A.Dyer, accepted as Drimia altissima (L.f.) Ker Gawl.
- Urginea indica (Roxb.) Kunth, accepted as Drimia indica (Roxb.) Jessop
- Urginea kniphofioides Baker, accepted as Drimia kniphofioides (Baker) J.C.Manning & Goldblatt
- Urginea lydenburgensis R.A.Dyer, accepted as Drimia delagoensis (Baker) Jessop
- Urginea macrocentra Baker, accepted as Drimia macrocentra (Baker) Jessop
- Urginea marginata (Thunb.) Baker, accepted as Drimia marginata (Thunb.) Jessop
- Urginea minor A.V.Duthie, accepted as Drimia minor (A.V.Duthie) Jessop
- Urginea modesta Baker, accepted as Drimia calcarata (Baker) Stedje
- Urginea multisetosa Baker, accepted as Drimia multisetosa (Baker) Jessop
- Urginea physodes (Jacq.) Baker, accepted as Drimia physodes (Jacq.) Jessop
- Urginea pusilla (Jacq.) Baker, accepted as Drimia physodes (Jacq.) Jessop
- Urginea rigidifolia Baker, accepted as Drimia sclerophylla J.C.Manning & Goldblatt
- Urginea rubella Baker, accepted as Drimia calcarata (Baker) Stedje
- Urginea sanguinea Schinz, accepted as Drimia sanguinea (Schinz) Jessop
- Urginea saniensis Hilliard & B.L.Burtt, accepted as Drimia saniensis (Hilliard & B.L.Burtt) J.C.Manning & Goldblatt
- Urginea tenella Baker, accepted as Drimia calcarata (Baker) Stedje
- Urginea virens Schltr. accepted as Drimia virens (Schltr.) J.C.Manning & Goldblatt

== Veltheimia ==
Genus Veltheimia

- Veltheimia bracteata Harv. ex Baker, endemic
- Veltheimia capensis (L.) DC. endemic

== Whiteheadia ==
Genus Whiteheadia:

- Whiteheadia bifolia (Jacq.) Baker, accepted as Massonia bifolia (Jacq.) J.C.Manning & Goldblatt, indigenous
- Whiteheadia latifolia Harv. accepted as Massonia bifolia (Jacq.) J.C.Manning & Goldblatt, indigenous
