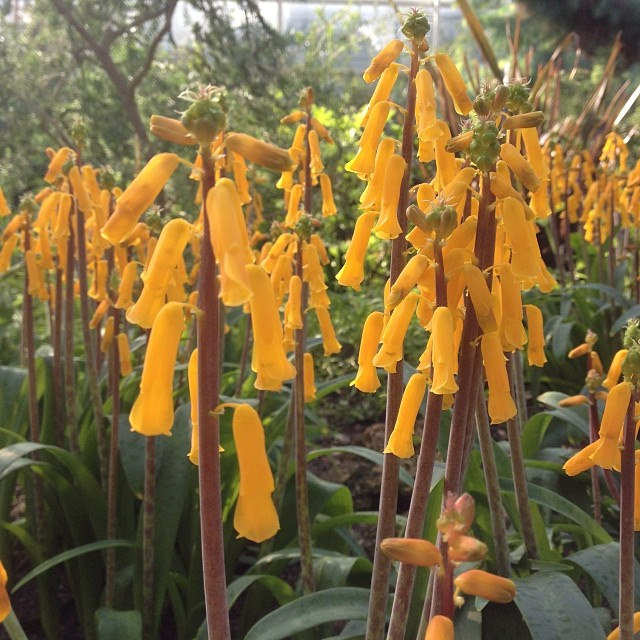

Scientific classification
- Kingdom: Plantae
- Clade: Embryophytes
- Clade: Tracheophytes
- Clade: Angiosperms
- Clade: Monocots
- Order: Asparagales
- Family: Asparagaceae
- Subfamily: Scilloideae
- Genus: Lachenalia
- Species: L. flava

Binomial name
- Lachenalia flava Andrews

Synonyms
- List: Lachenalia aloides var. aurea (Lindl.) Engl; Lachenalia aurea Lindl.; Lachenalia macrophylla Lem; Lachenalia quadricolor var. lutea Sims; Lachenalia tricolor var. aurea (Lindl.) Hook.f.

= Lachenalia flava =

Species of flowering plant

Lachenalia flava, the golden opal flower, is a species of flowering plant in the genus Lachenalia native to the southwest Cape Provinces of South Africa. It has gained the Royal Horticultural Society's Award of Garden Merit.

== Description ==
Lachenalia flava is a bulbous plant with:

- Bulb: Rounded, 15–20 mm in diameter, produces offsets.
- Leaves: Two, lance-shaped, 85–150 mm long, 12–30 mm wide, fleshy, light green, sometimes blotched with dark green or maroon.
- Flower stalk (scape): Upright, 10–20 cm tall, fleshy, purple or green with purple blotches, bearing few to many flowers.
- Flowers: Tubular, mostly pendulous, golden orange outer tepals (13–18 mm), bright yellow inner tepals (26–28 mm) with spreading tips and small swellings; stamens and style initially enclosed, style later protrudes.

== Conservation and habitat ==
Lachenalia flava is endemic to the Western Cape of South Africa, where it occurs on rocky sandstone and shale slopes within fynbos and renosterveld vegetation. The species is adapted to fire-prone habitats, with mass flowering stimulated by burning, although it is not strictly dependent on fire for regeneration. Pollination is primarily by sunbirds, and its relatively large seeds are dispersed by wind after being shaken from the capsules.

Historically, the species was recorded from Paarl Mountain and Wellington to the upper Breede River Valley near Tulbagh, but it has become locally extinct at some sites, including Paarl Mountain. It now survives in only two main subpopulations: in Bain's Kloof (Hawequas Mountains) and between Tulbagh and Wolseley. Habitat loss due to urban expansion and agriculture in the Breede River Valley, as well as competition from invasive alien plants, are the principal threats to its persistence.

The South African National Biodiversity Institute (SANBI) has assessed Lachenalia flava as Vulnerable (VU D2) under IUCN criteria, owing to its restricted distribution and ongoing decline in habitat quality. The species has also been recorded as a garden escape in Australia, but introduced populations are not considered in conservation assessments, which focus on the native South African range.
