= Lachenalia vanzyliae =

Scientific classification
- Kingdom: Plantae
- Clade: Embryophytes
- Clade: Tracheophytes
- Clade: Angiosperms
- Clade: Monocots
- Order: Asparagales
- Family: Asparagaceae
- Subfamily: Scilloideae
- Genus: Lachenalia
- Species: L. vanzyliae

Binomial name
- Lachenalia vanzyliae (W.F.Barker) G.D.Duncan & T.J.Edwards

Synonyms
- Lachenalia aloides var. vanzyliae W.F.Barker

Species of flowering plant

Lachenalia vanzyliae, the van Zyl opal flower, is a species of flowering plant in the genus Lachenalia, native to the southwest Cape Provinces of South Africa. It has gained the Royal Horticultural Society's Award of Garden Merit.
