= Drimia secunda =

Conservation status
- Vulnerable (IUCN 3.1)

Scientific classification
- Kingdom: Plantae
- Clade: Tracheophytes
- Clade: Angiosperms
- Clade: Monocots
- Order: Asparagales
- Family: Asparagaceae
- Subfamily: Scilloideae
- Genus: Drimia
- Species: D. secunda

Binomial name
- Drimia secunda (B.Nord.) J.C.Manning & Goldblatt

Synonyms
- Rhadamanthus secundus B.Nord.

Species of flowering plant

Drimia secunda (syn. Rhadamanthus secundus) is a species of flowering plant in the family Asparagaceae. It is a bulbous geophyte which is endemic to southwestern Namibia. Its natural habitats are rocky areas and cold desert.
