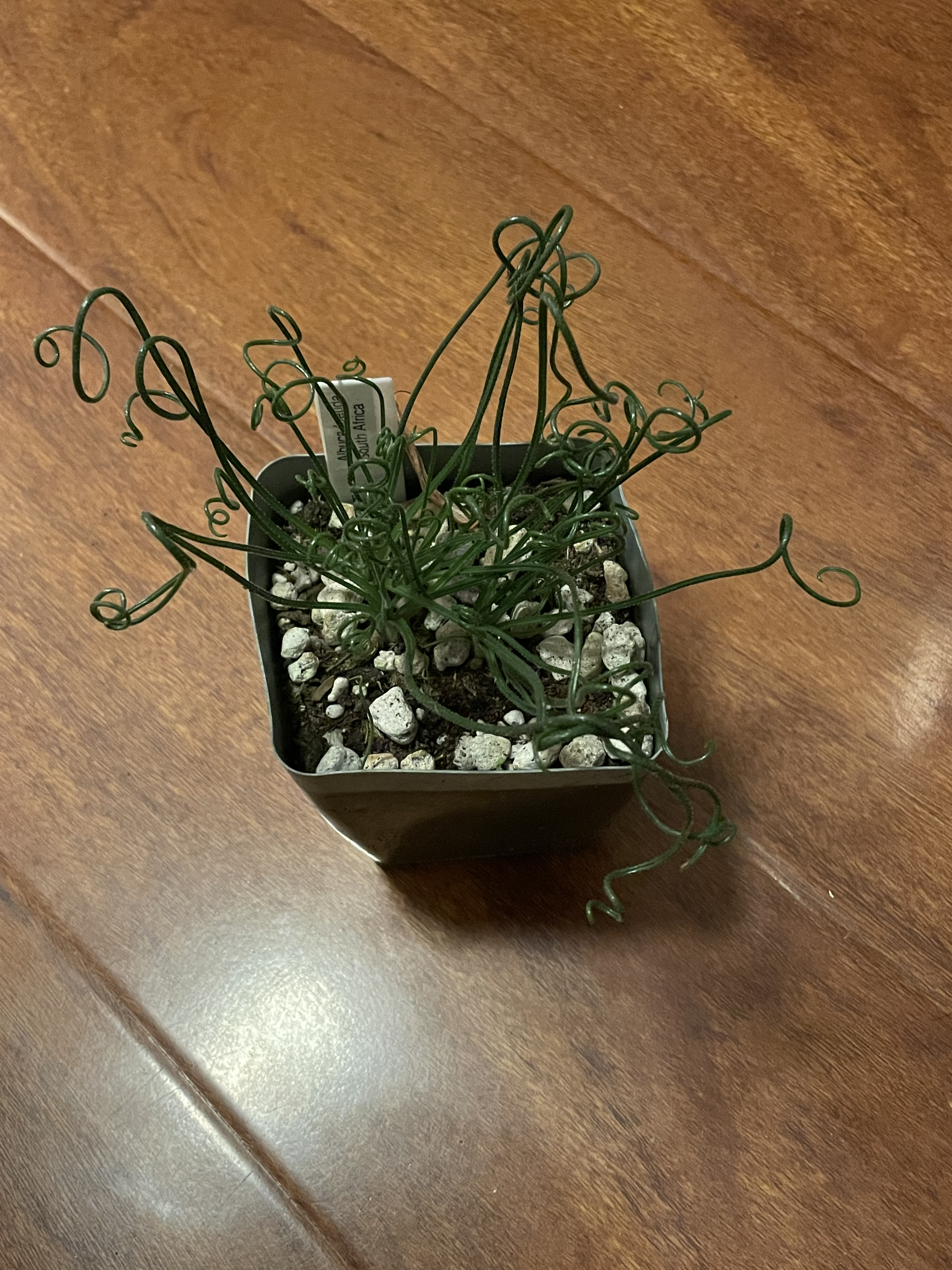

Scientific classification
- Kingdom: Plantae
- Clade: Tracheophytes
- Clade: Angiosperms
- Clade: Monocots
- Order: Asparagales
- Family: Asparagaceae
- Subfamily: Scilloideae
- Genus: Albuca
- Species: A. foetida

Binomial name
- Albuca foetida U.Müll.-Doblies

= Albuca foetida =

Species of flowering plants

Albuca foetida is a species of slime lily native to Namaqualand in South Africa first described in 1996 in Feddes Repertorium.

== Description ==
Albuca foetida is a geophyte, meaning it is a bulb plant, and has thin green leaves with tricomes. The leaves curl when there is sufficient sun. Leaves are 4-5 inches long. The glands emit a foul smell.

== Habitat ==
This plant grows in the deserts of Namaqualand. It lives in a subtropical environment

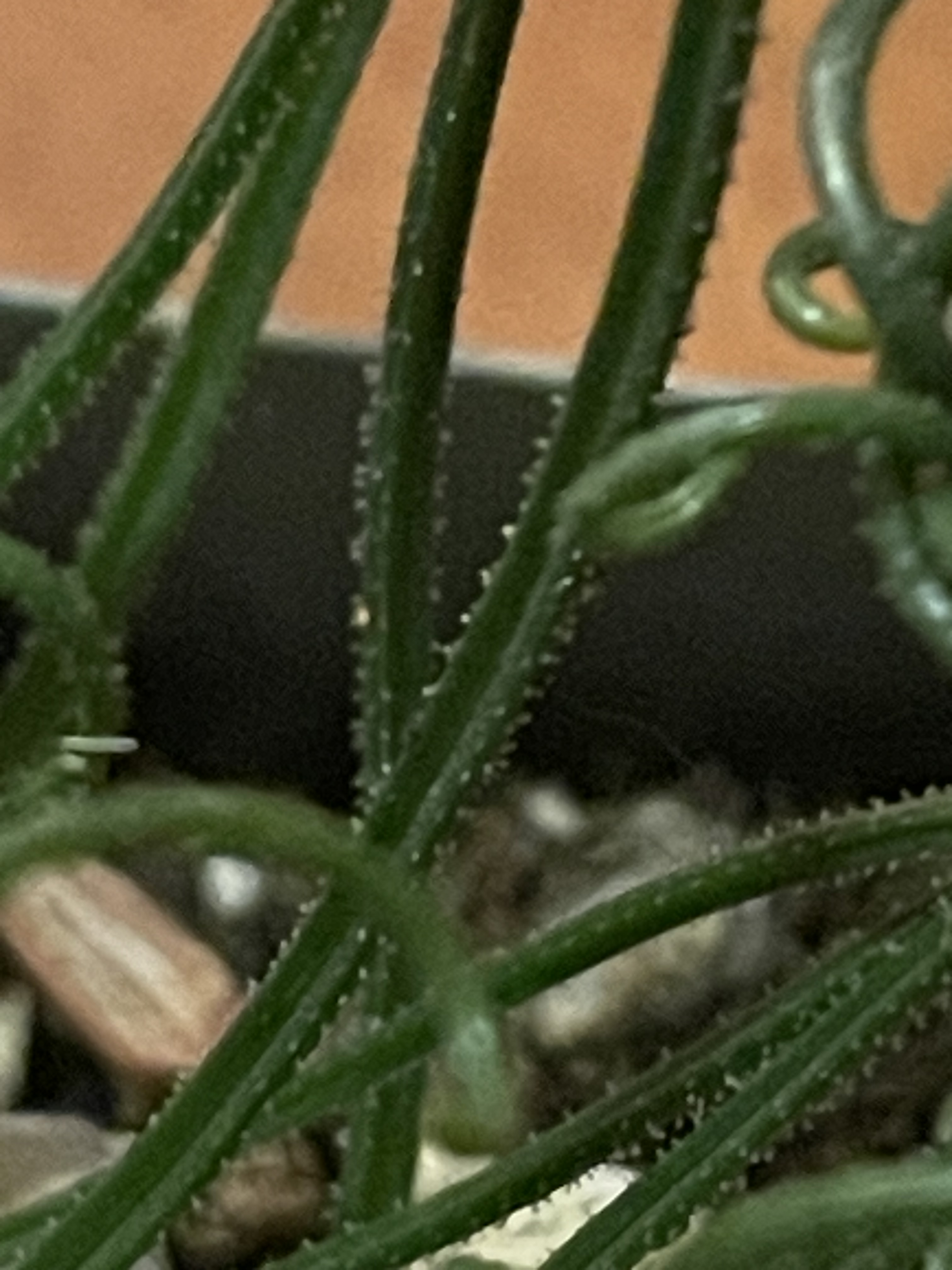
Tricomes

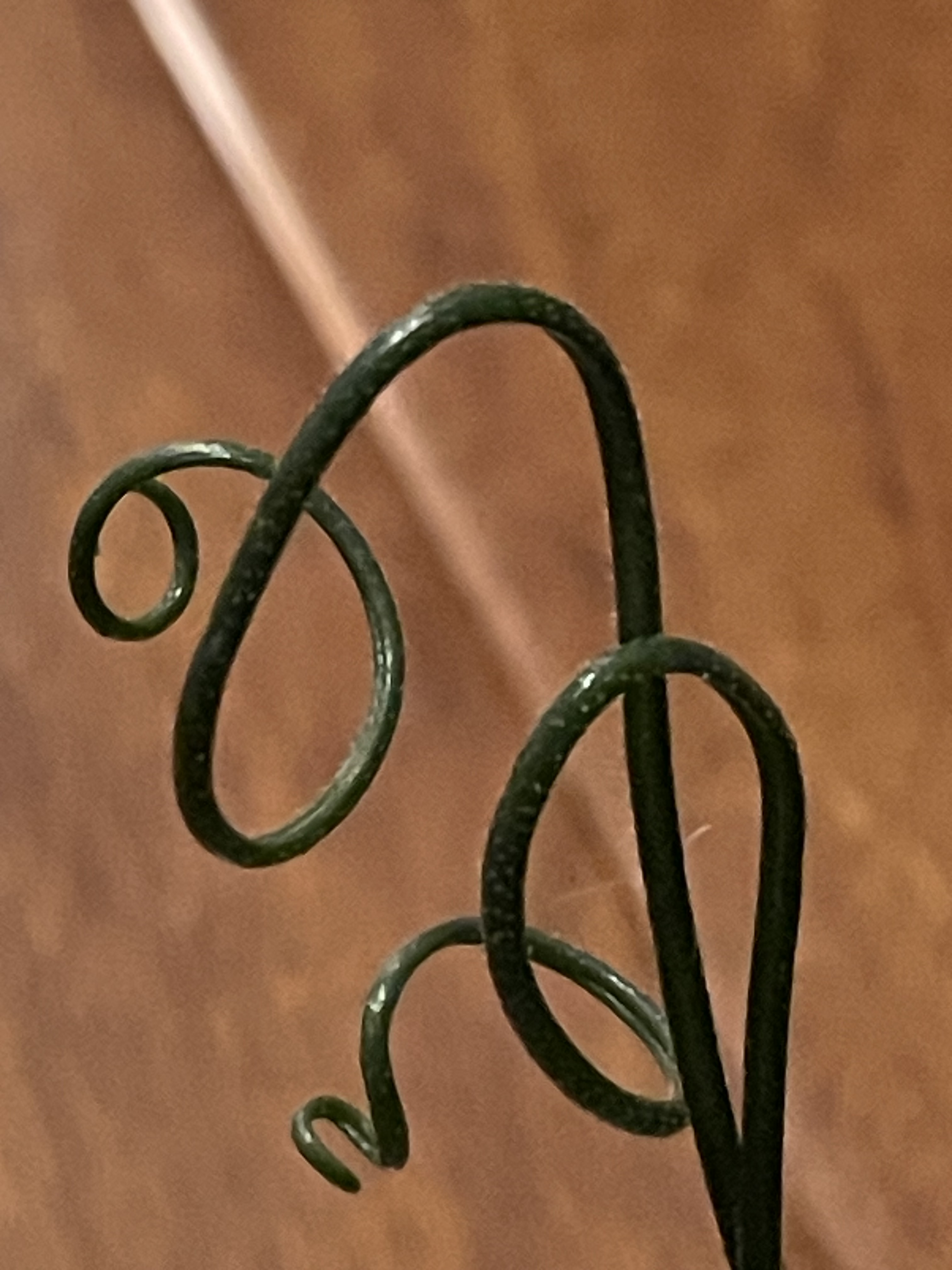
Close up of the curled leaves
