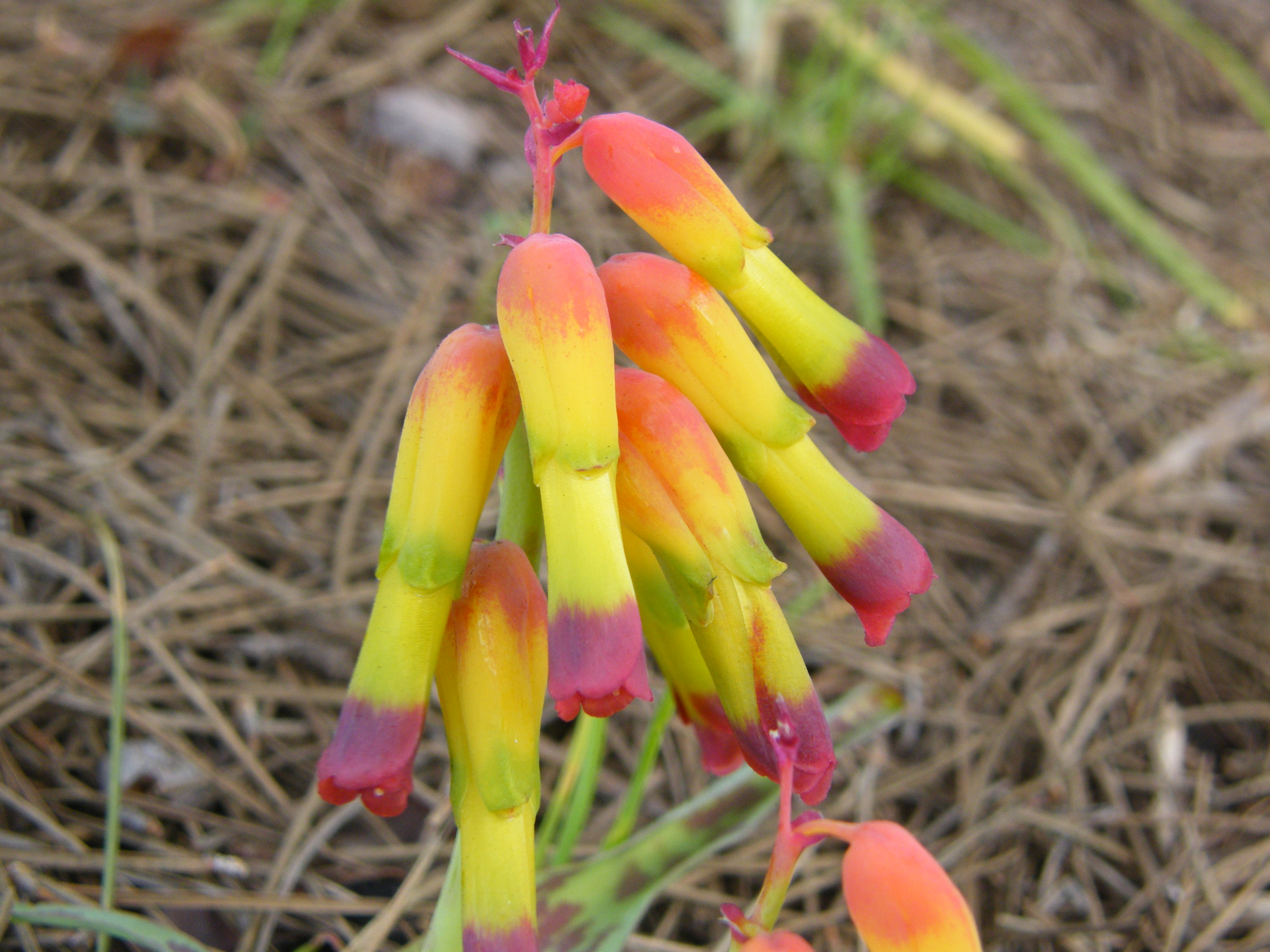

Scientific classification
- Kingdom: Plantae
- Clade: Embryophytes
- Clade: Tracheophytes
- Clade: Angiosperms
- Clade: Monocots
- Order: Asparagales
- Family: Asparagaceae
- Subfamily: Scilloideae
- Genus: Lachenalia
- Species: L. quadricolor

Binomial name
- Lachenalia quadricolor Jacq.

= Lachenalia quadricolor =

Species of flowering plant

Lachenalia quadricolor, the four‑coloured opal flower, is a species of flowering plant in the genus Lachenalia, native to the southwest Cape Provinces of South Africa. It has gained the Royal Horticultural Society's Award of Garden Merit.
