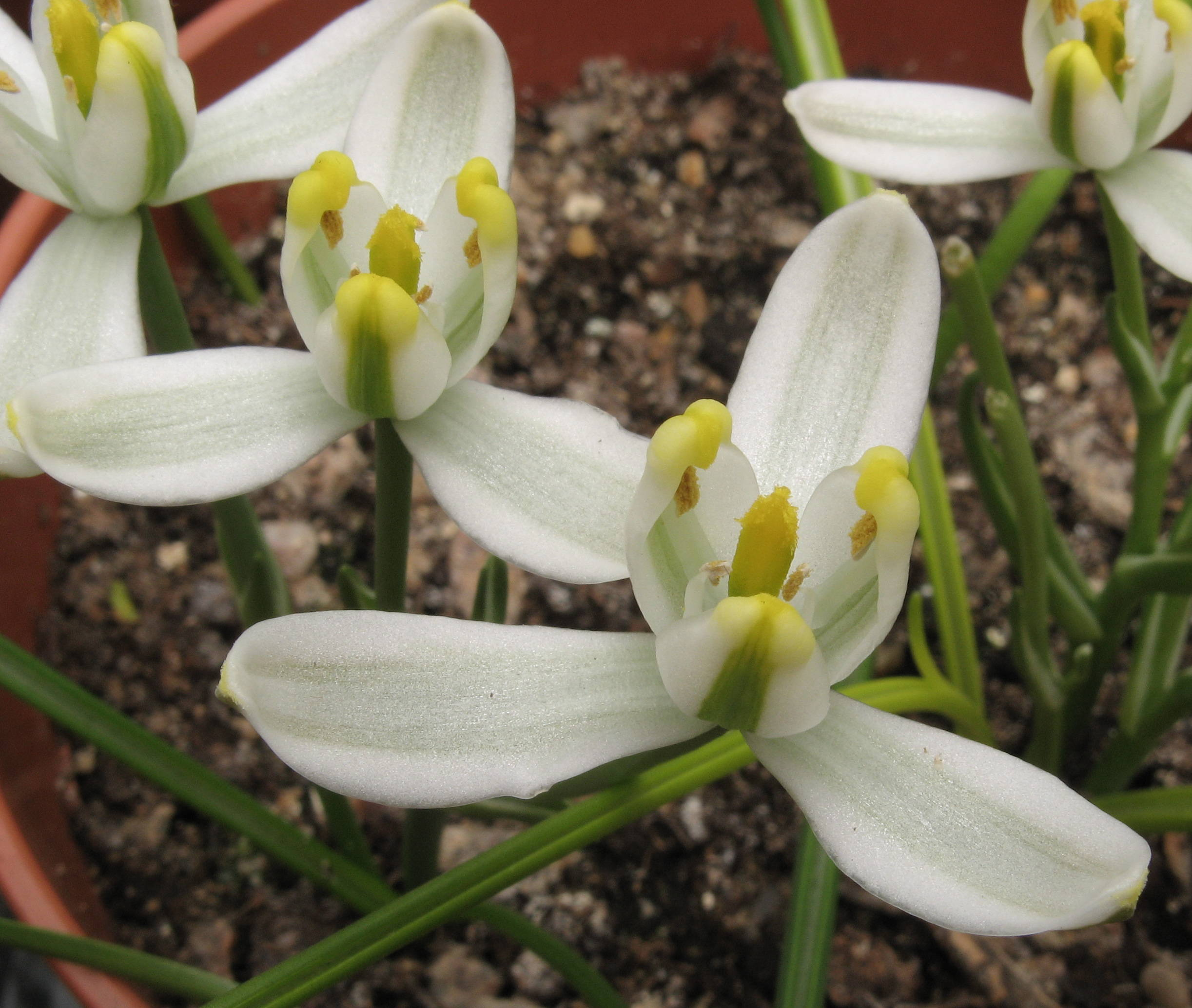
- In cultivation

Scientific classification
- Kingdom: Plantae
- Clade: Tracheophytes
- Clade: Angiosperms
- Clade: Monocots
- Order: Asparagales
- Family: Asparagaceae
- Subfamily: Scilloideae
- Genus: Albuca
- Species: A. humilis

Binomial name
- Albuca humilis Baker

Synonyms
- Ornithogalum humile (Baker) J.C.Manning & Goldblatt

= Albuca humilis =

Species of flowering plant

Albuca humilis is a bulbous flowering plant, placed in the genus Albuca in the subfamily Scilloideae of the family Asparagaceae. It is native to southern Africa – to South Africa from the Free State to KwaZulu-Natal according to some sources, or to the Drakensberg Mountains of Lesotho according to others.

Albuca humilis was first described by John Gilbert Baker in 1895. The specific epithet humilis means "low-growing". It grows from small white bulbs, each producing only one or two narrow leaves in the summer, dying down in the winter. The flower stem is up to 10 cm (4 in) tall, with one to three upward-facing flowers with six tepals up to 2 cm (0.8 in) long. All the tepals are white with a green stripe on the outside; the inner three also have yellow tips. The flowers are strongly scented and have been described as smelling of marzipan.

The species is sufficiently hardy to be cultivated in the UK when given some protection by an alpine house or bulb frame.
