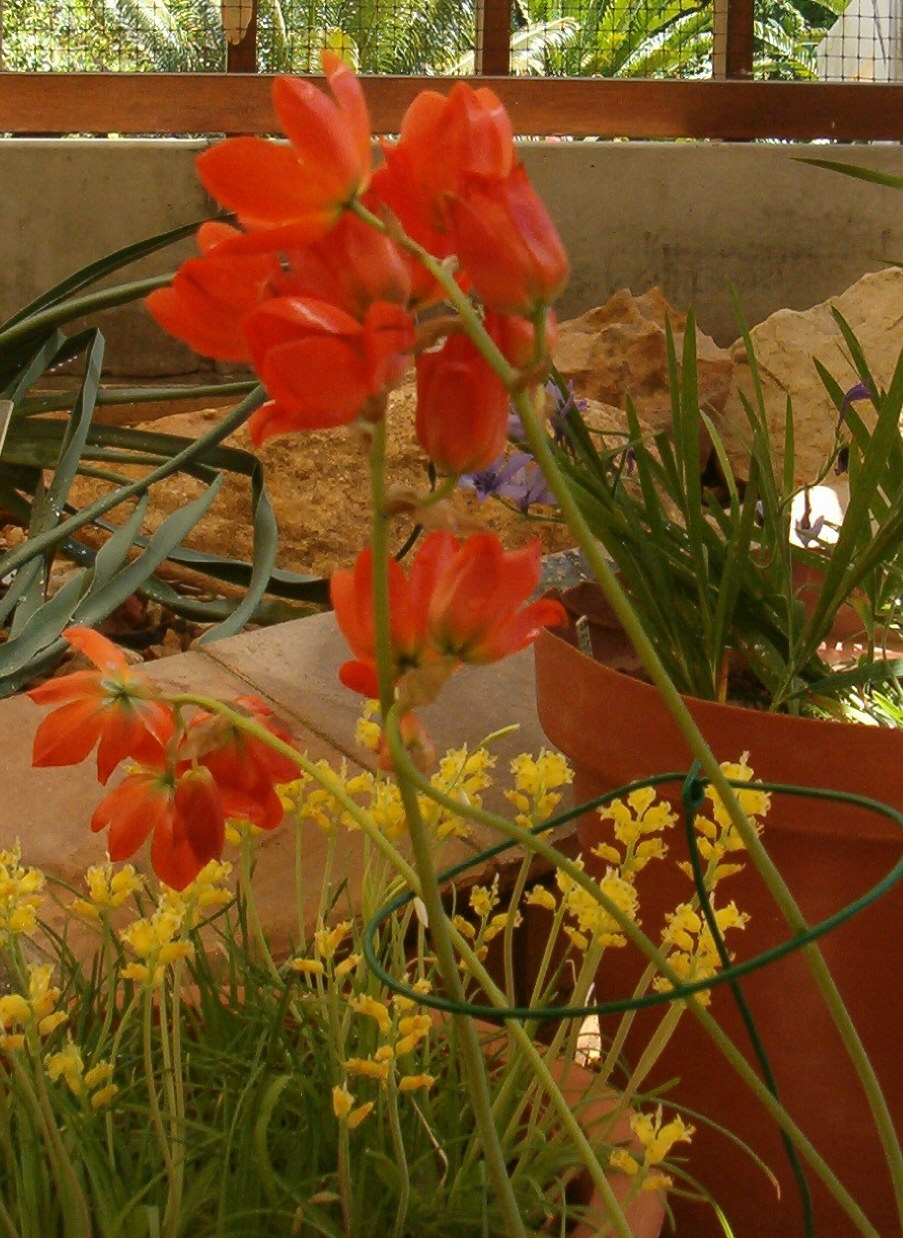

Scientific classification
- Kingdom: Plantae
- Clade: Tracheophytes
- Clade: Angiosperms
- Clade: Monocots
- Order: Asparagales
- Family: Asparagaceae
- Subfamily: Scilloideae
- Tribe: Ornithogaleae
- Genus: Ornithogalum
- Species: O. maculatum

Binomial name
- Ornithogalum maculatum Nikolaus Joseph von Jacquin

Synonyms
- Eliokarmos maculatus (Jacq.) Raf.; Eliokarmos neomaculatus Mart.-Azorín, M.B.Crespo & Juan; Ornithogalum insigne F.M.Leight.; Ornithogalum maculatum Thunb. nom. illeg.; Ornithogalum magnificum Poelln. nom. illeg.; Ornithogalum notatum Schult. & Schult.f.; Ornithogalum speciosum Baker nom. illeg.; Ornithogalum splendens L.Bolus; Ornithogalum thunbergianum Baker; Phaeocles maculata (Jacq.) Salisb. nom. inval.

= Ornithogalum maculatum =

Species of flowering plant

Ornithogalum maculatum is a flowering plant native to the Cape Provinces of South Africa.
