= Albuca hallii =

Scientific classification
- Kingdom: Plantae
- Clade: Tracheophytes
- Clade: Angiosperms
- Clade: Monocots
- Order: Asparagales
- Family: Asparagaceae
- Subfamily: Scilloideae
- Genus: Albuca
- Species: A. hallii

Binomial name
- Albuca hallii U.Müll.-Doblies

Species of asparagus plant

Albuca hallii, the slime lily, is a succulent bulbous plant in the family Asparagaceae, and is endemic around Luderitz, Namibia. Its most curious feature is its two succulent leaves tightly spiraled like green corkscrews. The bulb also is succulent.
