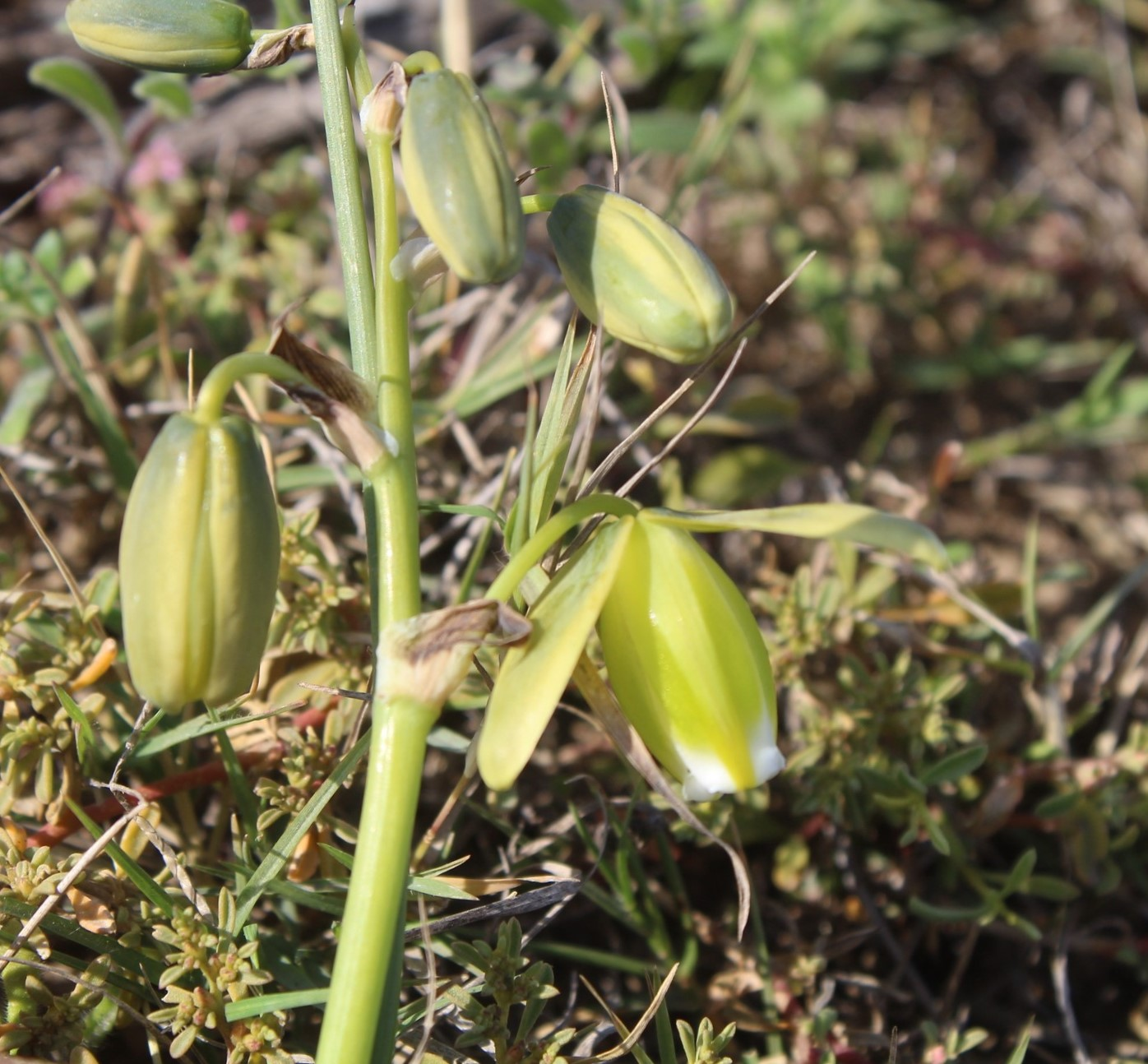

Scientific classification
- Kingdom: Plantae
- Clade: Tracheophytes
- Clade: Angiosperms
- Clade: Monocots
- Order: Asparagales
- Family: Asparagaceae
- Subfamily: Scilloideae
- Genus: Albuca
- Species: A. acuminata

Binomial name
- Albuca acuminata Baker

Synonyms
- Ornithogalum acutum J.C.Manning & Goldblatt 2003; Albuca convoluta E.Phillips 1926

= Albuca acuminata =

Species of plant

Albuca acuminata is a species of small, perennial, bulbous plant in the asparagus family. It is native to southern Africa from Namibia to the Cape Province of South Africa, where it occurs in rocky areas, as far east as Port Alfred.

== Description ==
A geophyte reaching 20–30 cm in height. The bulb usually has numerous fibres around the top, made from the persistent remnants of the leaf-tunics. The species bears 2-to-10 smooth, slender, linear, channeled leaves. The leaves are clasping at the base.

The slender peduncle terminates in a lax raceme. The flowers are drooping ('nodding') and pale yellow with broad green central stripes.
