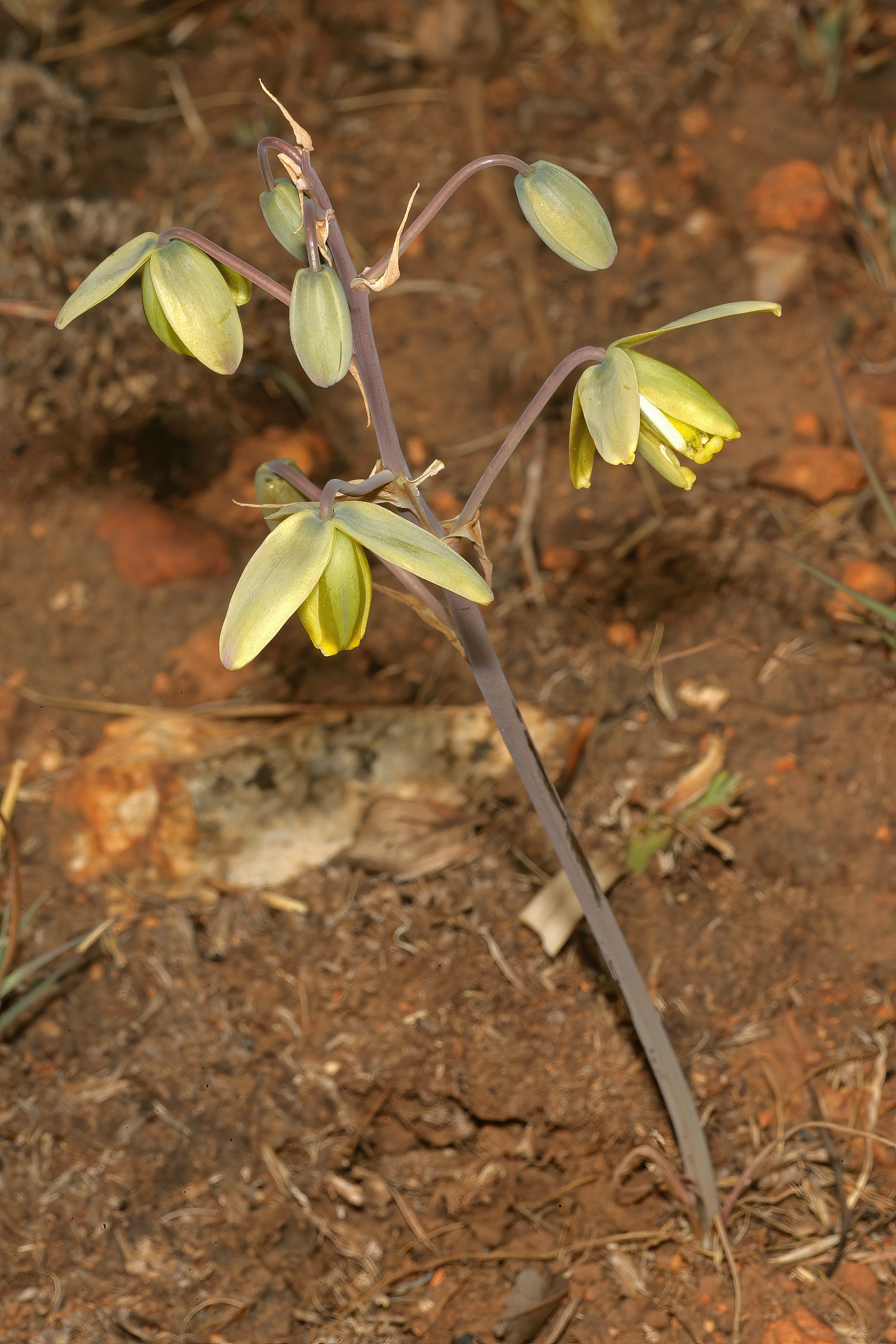

Scientific classification
- Kingdom: Plantae
- Clade: Tracheophytes
- Clade: Angiosperms
- Clade: Monocots
- Order: Asparagales
- Family: Asparagaceae
- Subfamily: Scilloideae
- Genus: Albuca
- Species: A. juncifolia

Binomial name
- Albuca juncifolia Baker

Synonyms
- Albuca imbricata F.M.Leight.; Ornithogalum imbricatum (F.M.Leight.) J.C.Manning & Goldblatt

= Albuca juncifolia =

Species of flowering plant

Albuca juncifolia is a bulbous flowering plant, placed in the genus Albuca in the subfamily Scilloideae of the family Asparagaceae.

It is native to the Western Cape in South Africa. It occurs on sandy (often calcareous) flats, from Ceres in the north, to the Cape Peninsula, and as far east as Mossel Bay.

== Description ==
A geophyte reaching 15–30 cm in height. The species bears several smooth, slender, stiff leaves, that are usually only channeled near the base, and are terete towards the tips. The leaves are not clasping at the base.

The slender peduncle terminates in a lax raceme. The flowers are drooping ('nodding') and pale yellow with broad green central stripes.
