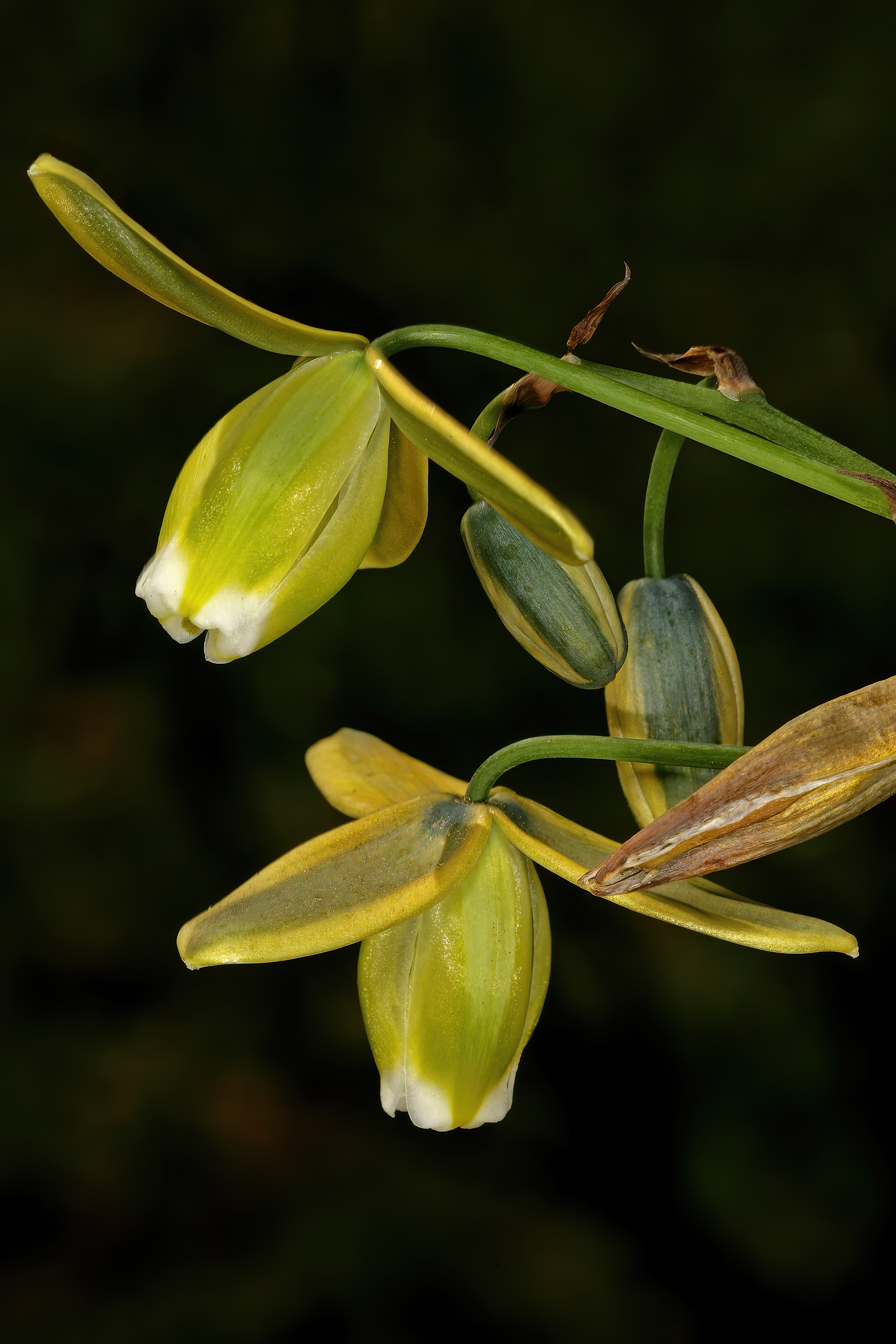

Scientific classification
- Kingdom: Plantae
- Clade: Tracheophytes
- Clade: Angiosperms
- Clade: Monocots
- Order: Asparagales
- Family: Asparagaceae
- Subfamily: Scilloideae
- Genus: Albuca
- Species: A. cooperi

Binomial name
- Albuca cooperi Baker

Synonyms
- Albuca flaccida Baker 1873

= Albuca cooperi =

Species of plant

Albuca cooperi is a species of small, perennial, bulbous plant in the asparagus family.

It is native to the western parts of South Africa. It occurs in sandy, sometimes limestone, areas, from the Richtersveld in the north, southwards to the Cape Peninsula, and eastwards through the Great Karoo, to Willowmore.

== Description ==
A geophyte reaching 30–60 cm in height. The bulb is ovoid, usually with some thin fibres around the top, made from the persistent remnants of the leaf-tunics. The species bears only 2-to-4 smooth, slender, linear, channeled leaves. The leaves are clasping and warty at the base.

The slender peduncle terminates in a lax raceme. The flowers are drooping ('nodding') and pale yellow with broad green central stripes. In some cases, the septa has a faint crest.
