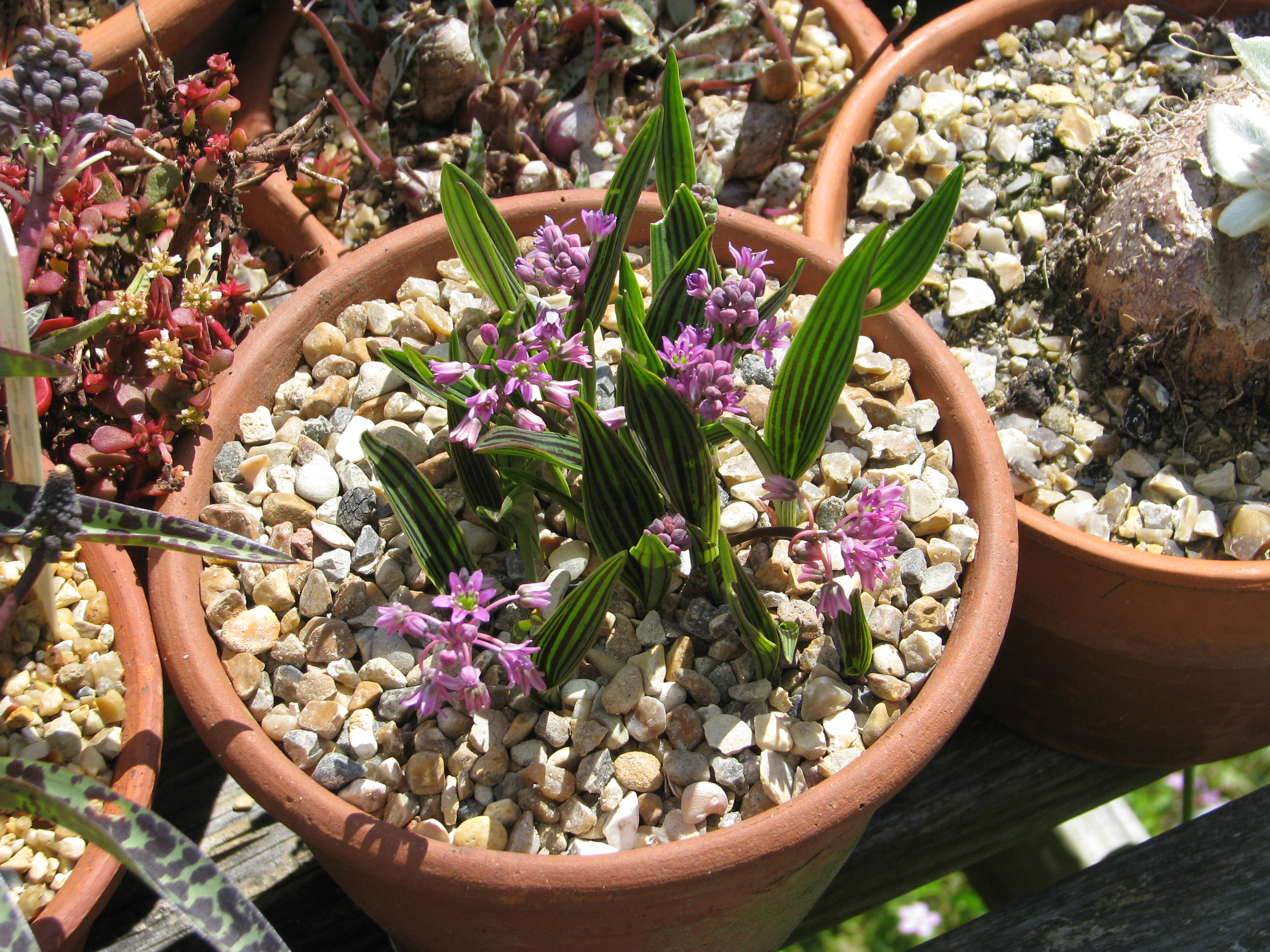

Scientific classification
- Kingdom: Plantae
- Clade: Embryophytes
- Clade: Tracheophytes
- Clade: Angiosperms
- Clade: Monocots
- Order: Asparagales
- Family: Asparagaceae
- Subfamily: Scilloideae
- Genus: Ledebouria
- Species: L. cooperi

Binomial name
- Ledebouria cooperi (Hook.f.) Jessop

Synonyms
- Many, including: Scilla cooperi Hook.f.; Scilla globosa Baker

= Ledebouria cooperi =

Species of flowering plant

Ledebouria cooperi is a species of bulbous flowering plant in the family Asparagaceae, also called Cooper's African hyacinth. It is native to Eswatini, Namibia, and South Africa (Cape Provinces, Free State, KwaZulu-Natal, and Northern Provinces).

== Description ==
The flowers of Ledebouria cooperi are mostly lilac, pink, or purple. The leaves are linear in shape, pointing upwards or spreading. The species is variable in appearance, particularly in the shape and colouring of the leaves.

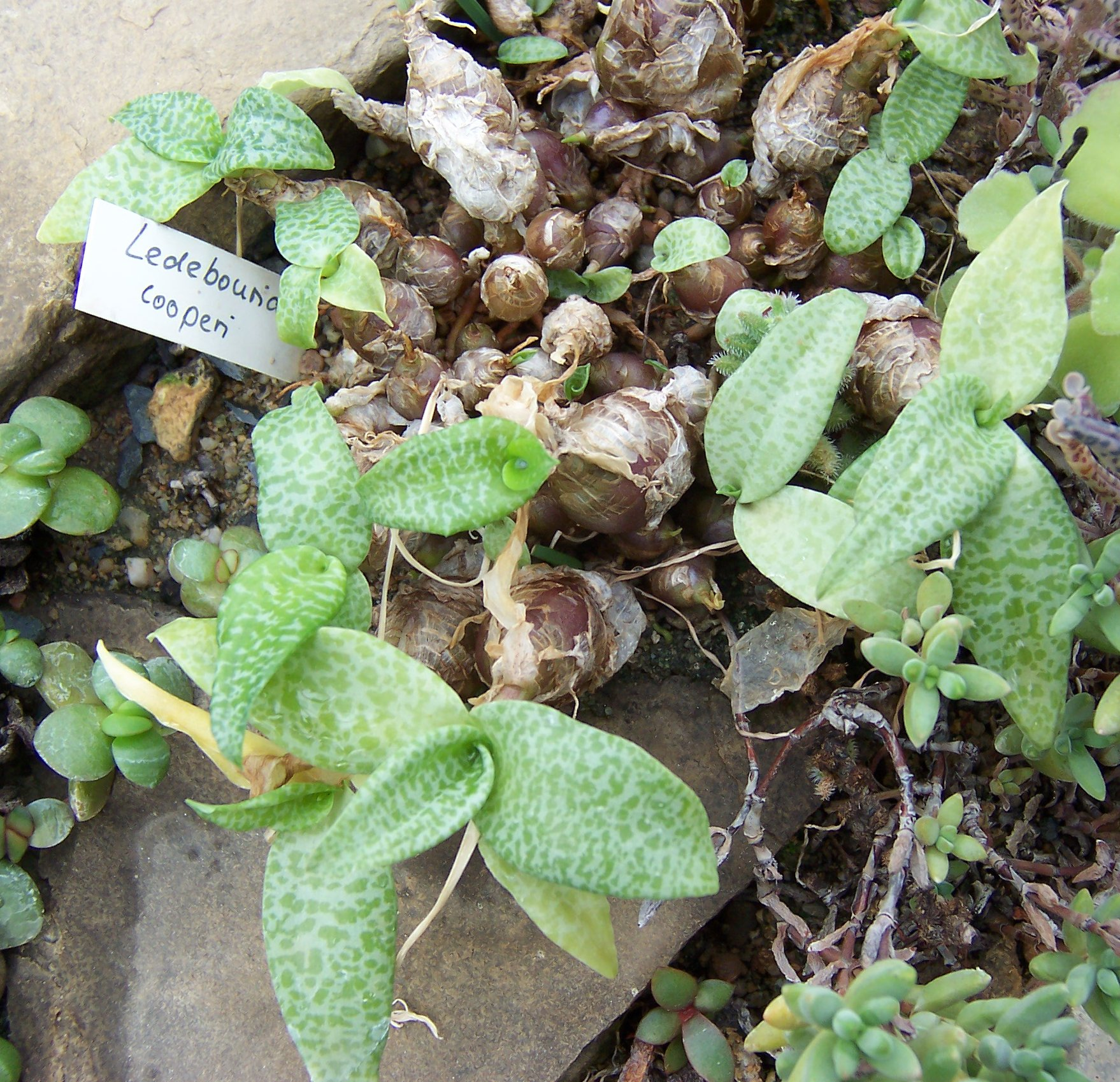
