= Eucomis grimshawii =

Scientific classification
- Kingdom: Plantae
- Clade: Tracheophytes
- Clade: Angiosperms
- Clade: Monocots
- Order: Asparagales
- Family: Asparagaceae
- Subfamily: Scilloideae
- Genus: Eucomis
- Species: E. grimshawii

Binomial name
- Eucomis grimshawii G.D.Duncan & Zonn.

Species of flowering plant

Eucomis grimshawii is a species of flowering plant in the family Asparagaceae, subfamily Scilloideae, native to the Cape Provinces. It was first described by Graham Duncan and Ben Zonneveld in 2010.

== Description ==
Eucomis grimshawii is a short summer-growing bulbous plant, up to 8–10 cm (3–4 in) tall. The bulb is ovoid, about 3 cm (1 1/8 in) across, with a pale brown outer tunic. The bulb produces four or five leaves, 9–12 cm (3 1/2–4 1/2 in) long and 4–6 cm (1 1/2–2 1/4 in) wide, with flat or slightly undulate margins. The inflorescence is a dense raceme 3–5 cm (1 1/4–2 in) long, with a variable number of flowers. The flowering stem (scape) is shaded dark maroon or magenta on the lower half, with similarly coloured marks on the upper half. Individual flowers are slightly sweetly scented, with greenish white tepals up to 5 mm (3/16 in) long. The upper flowers have up to 1 mm (1/32 in) long pedicels, the lower ones are sessile. The inflorescence is topped by a head or "coma" of 9–16 bracts 15–35 mm (5/8–1 3/8 in) long. The ovary has three locules. The seeds are dull blackish brown.

== Taxonomy ==
Eucomis grimshawii was first described in 2010 by Graham Duncan and Ben Zonneveld, and named after J. Grimshaw who first discovered it in 2002, in the southern Drakensberg, south of Lesotho. E. grimshawii is one of the group of smaller summer-growing diploid species of Eucomis.

E. grimshawii most closely resembles Eucomis schijffii, but is shorter, and has greenish white, sweet-scented flowers rather than dark purple flowers with an unpleasant smell, and pale green rather than glaucous leaves. Both species have dull sculptured seeds rather than smooth glossy ones.

== Distribution and habitat ==
Eucomis grimshawii was found in the Eastern Cape province of South Africa in the Drakensberg Mountains, south of Lesotho, at an altitude of around 2,700 m (8,858 ft). It grows in rich soil, on shady, seasonally wet, south-facing grassy slopes and in boggy conditions.
