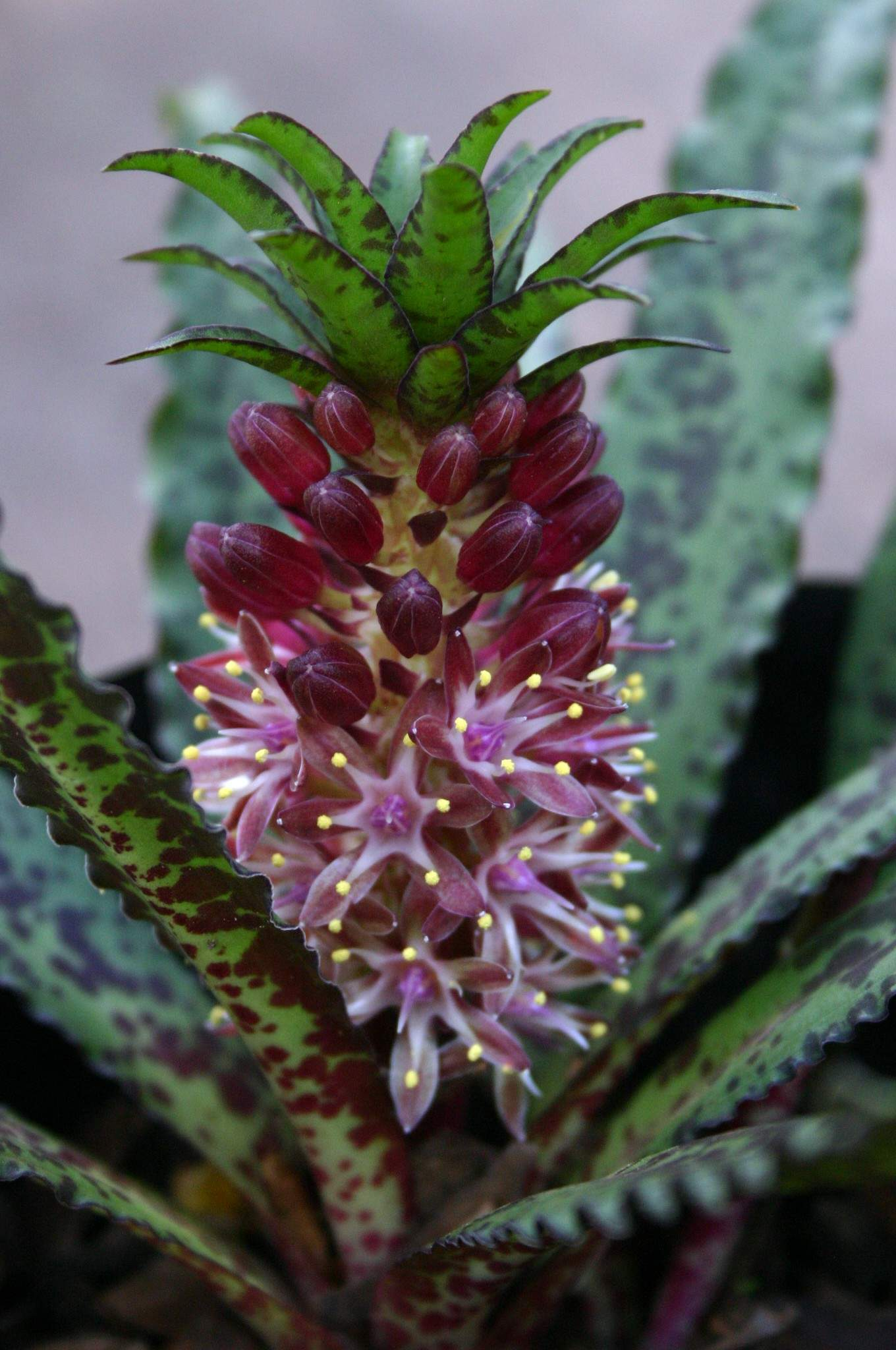

Scientific classification
- Kingdom: Plantae
- Clade: Tracheophytes
- Clade: Angiosperms
- Clade: Monocots
- Order: Asparagales
- Family: Asparagaceae
- Subfamily: Scilloideae
- Genus: Eucomis
- Species: E. vandermerwei

Binomial name
- Eucomis vandermerwei I.Verd.

= Eucomis vandermerwei =

Species of flowering plant

Eucomis vandermerwei is a South African bulbous perennial flowering plant, a member of the asparagus family (Asparagaceae, subfamily Scilloideae), and like other members of Eucomis is commonly known as pineapple lily for its superficial resemblance to that plant (Ananas comosus), although not closely related to it. This species is one of the smallest in the genus, and is native to a high-rainfall region of western Mpumalanga in South Africa. The dense rosette of leaves, either prostrate or ascending, is heavily blotched with purple, and the leaf-edges are markedly crisped or wavy. The star-shaped burgundy flowers appear in midsummer (November–January in South Africa), and are borne on a spike (raceme) topped by a "head" of leafy bracts.

== Description ==
Eucomis vandermerwei is a short summer-growing bulbous plant, reaching at most 20 cm (8 in) tall. It bulb is ovoid, 3–6 cm (1 1/4–2 1/4 in) across. Three to six leaves emerge from a bulb and are up to 60 cm (2 ft) long and 15 cm (6 in) wide, heavily spotted and marked with purple, with hard undulate margins. The flowers are arranged in a raceme on a purple-spotted stem (peduncule) 6–12 cm (2 1/2–4 1/2 in) tall. The raceme is topped by a head or "coma" of up to 11 bracts which, like the leaves, are purple spotted. The unpleasantly scented flowers have maroon tepals and green stamen filaments bearing mauve anthers. Each flower is borne on a stalk (pedicel), 2–4 cm (1–1 1/2 in) long. The ovary is green tinged with purple and is followed by a brownish-maroon seed capsule producing relatively large, ovoid, black glossy seeds.

== Taxonomy ==
Eucomis vandermerwei was first described by Inez Verdoorn in 1944. The species was first collected in 1937 by the amateur botanist Frederick Ziervogel van der Merwe in western Mpumalanga. It is one of a group of mainly short, diploid species with 2n = 2x = 30 chromosomes.

== Distribution and habitat ==
Eucomis vandermerwei occurs in western Mpumalanga, part of the Northern Provinces, in the most north-eastern part of South Africa. It is endemic to high slopes and plateaux at altitudes of 2,200–2,500 m (7,200–8,200 ft). It grows in small groups in sunny positions in well-drained stony and rocky habitats with acid soil.

== Conservation ==
Eucomis vandermerwei has been assessed as "vulnerable" in the Red List of South African Plants, and the population is declining. It is only known from six to eight locations. Threats include its habitat being converted to forestry, overgrazing and trampling, poor fire control and alien vegetation. Harvesting for medicinal purposes by local people is also a threat, as is the expansion of coal mining. It is protected where it occurs in the Verloren Valei Nature Reserve. Its seed capsules are heavily parasitized by insects, resulting in poor seed germination.

== Cultivation ==
Eucomis vandermerwei is cultivated as an ornamental bulbous plant. It has been described as "one of the most desirable dwarf summer-growing South African bulbs", with very long-lasting flowers and cryptically marked foliage. In temperate areas such as Britain, E. vandermerwei requires a sheltered position in full sun, in a spot where temperatures do not fall below −5 °C (23 °F), for instance in southern and south-western coastal parts. In colder areas, dry frost-free storage in winter is recommended. It may be propagated from seed or leaf cuttings, by division of the large tunicated bulb or from offsets. It has gained the Royal Horticultural Society's Award of Garden Merit.

Some cultivars are either known or assumed to be derived from E. vandermerwei. These include:

- Eucomis 'Leia' – may be from a cross between E. vandermerwei and E. comosa
- Eucomis 'Freckles' – from a cross between Eucomis 'Leia' and E. vandermerwei
