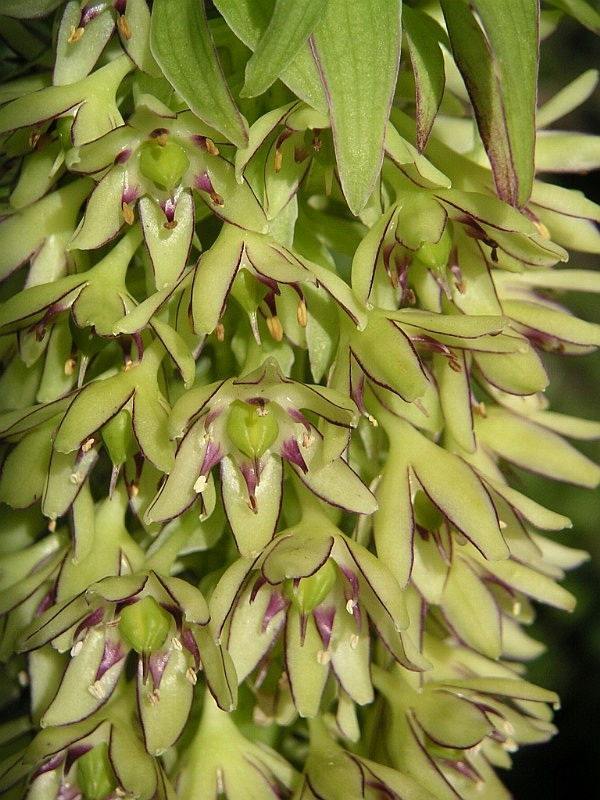

Scientific classification
- Kingdom: Plantae
- Clade: Tracheophytes
- Clade: Angiosperms
- Clade: Monocots
- Order: Asparagales
- Family: Asparagaceae
- Subfamily: Scilloideae
- Genus: Eucomis
- Species: E. bicolor

Binomial name
- Eucomis bicolor Baker

= Eucomis bicolor =

Species of flowering plant

Eucomis bicolor, the variegated pineapple lily is a bulbous species of flowering plant in the family Asparagaceae, subfamily Scilloideae, native to Southern Africa (the Cape Provinces, Lesotho, KwaZulu-Natal, the Free State, and the Northern Provinces). It is occasionally cultivated outside of the African continent as an ornamental bulbous plant.

== Description ==
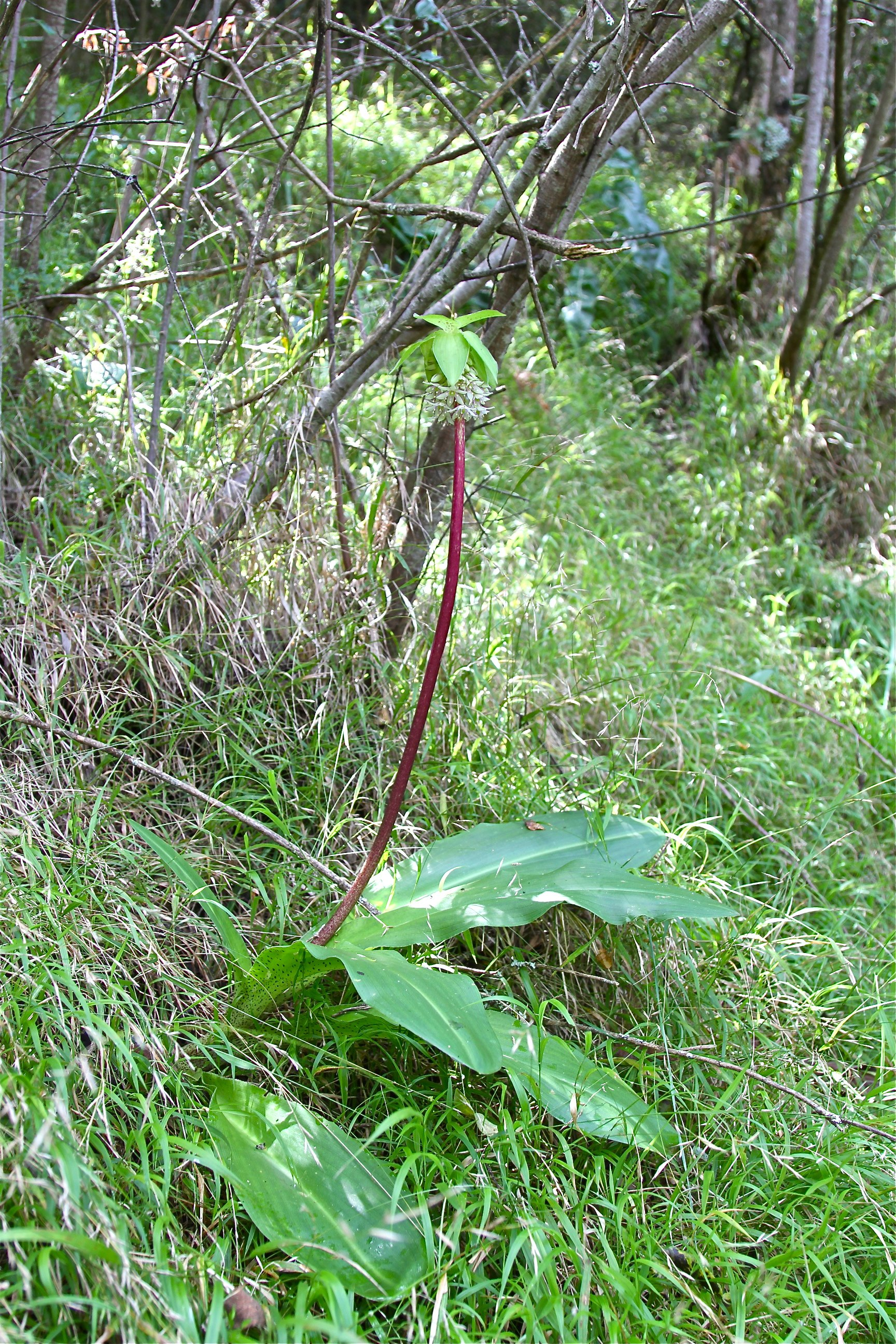
In the Royal Natal National Park

Eucomis bicolor is a perennial growing from a large underground bulb. It reaches 30–60 cm (12–24 in) in height, with a basal rosette of wavy purple maculated leaves 30–50 cm (12–20 in) long. In late summer (August in the UK), it produces a stout green stem (peduncule), often with purple streaks. The inflorescence is a raceme of pale green and purple colored flowers with tepals up to 15 mm (1/2 in) long, borne on pedicels 2 cm (3/4 in) long. The inflorescence is terminated by a head (coma) of pale green leafy bracts, sometimes tinged with purple. The open flowers have an odor of spoiled meat. The ovaries are bright green.

The homoisoflavanone-type antimicrobial compounds eucomin, eucomol, (E)-7-O-methyl-eucomin, (—)-7-O-methyleucomol, (+)-3,9-dihydro-eucomin and 7-O-methyl-3,9-dihydro-eucomin can be isolated from the bulbs of this species.

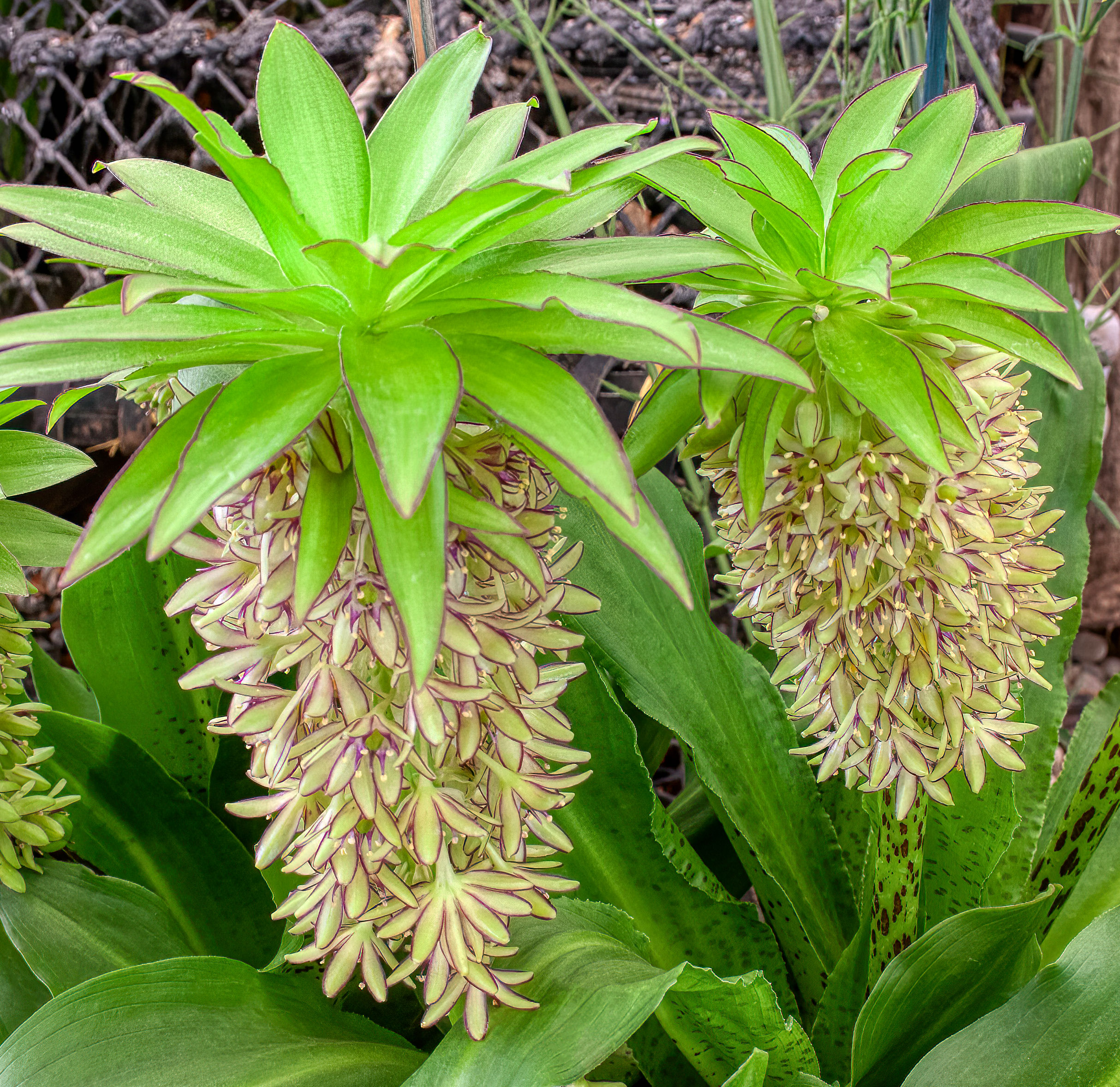

== Taxonomy ==
Eucomis bicolor was first described by John Gilbert Baker in 1878. The specific epithet bicolor means "two-coloured"; the tepals are pale green with purple margins. It is a tetraploid species of Eucomis, with 2n = 4x = 60.

== Distribution ==
Eucomis bicolor is native to Southern Africa (the Cape Provinces, Lesotho, KwaZulu-Natal, the Free State, and the Northern Provinces). Along the Drakensberg escarpment it is found in damp grassland, often near streams, up to elevations of 2,500 m (8,200 ft).

== Ecology ==
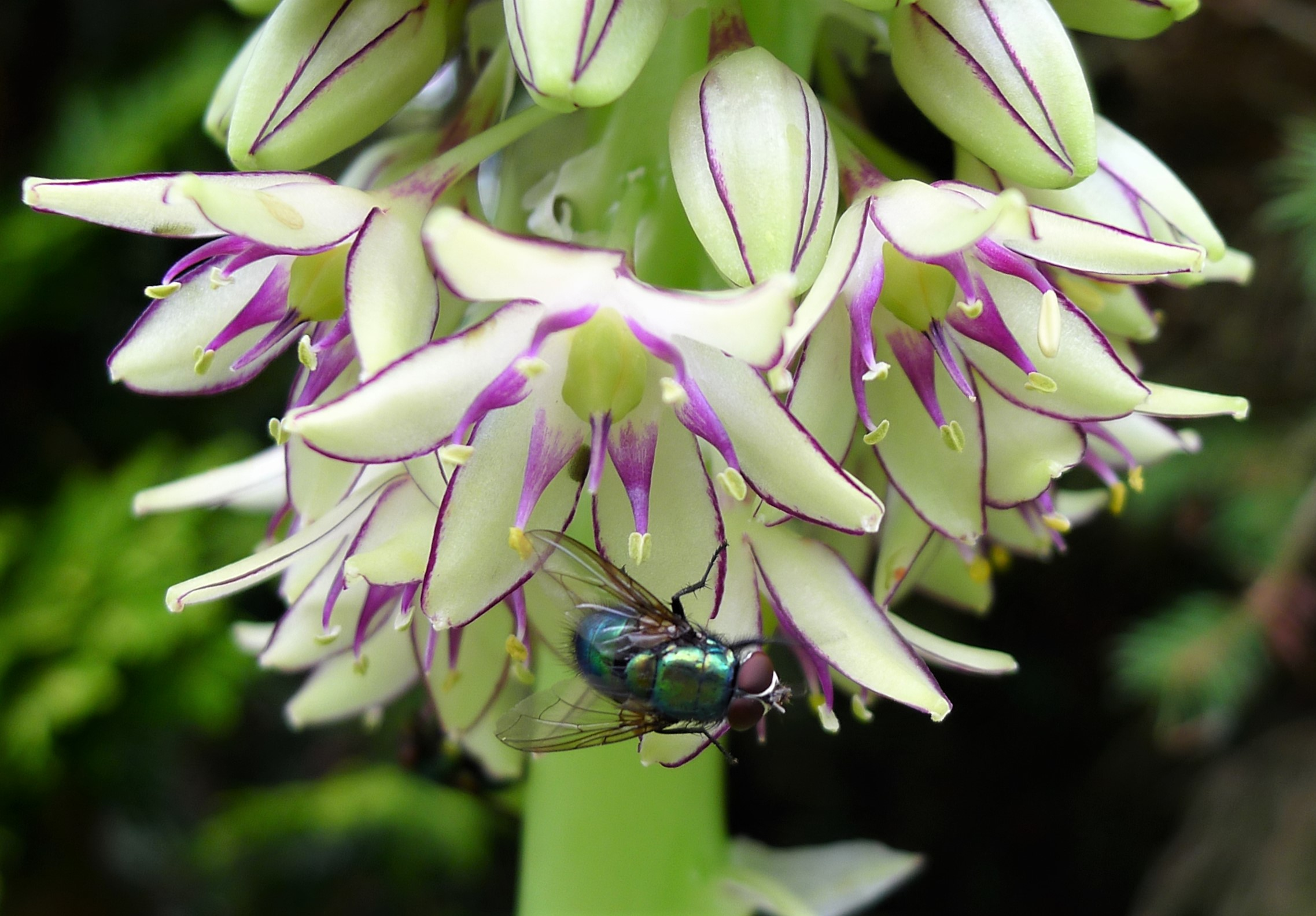

Eucomis bicolor is primarily pollinated by dipterans such as the blowflies, house flies and flesh flies, which are attracted by various volatile sulfur compounds that are emitted by the plant.

== Cultivation ==
In cultivation, Eucomis bicolor may not be fully frost-hardy. In the US, it is classed as hardy in USDA zones 8–10, and usually requiring a winter mulch in colder areas (zones 6 and 7). In the UK, it is said to be hardy down to −10 °C (14 °F), if kept dry in winter. Sun exposure and plentiful water are required in summer for successful flowering. It has gained the Royal Horticultural Society's Award of Garden Merit.

The cultivar E. bicolor 'Alba' lacks all purple coloration and may have reduced odor. It resembles Eucomis autumnalis but can be distinguished by the presence of long flower stalks known as pedicels.

'Alba' cultivar with long pedicels
