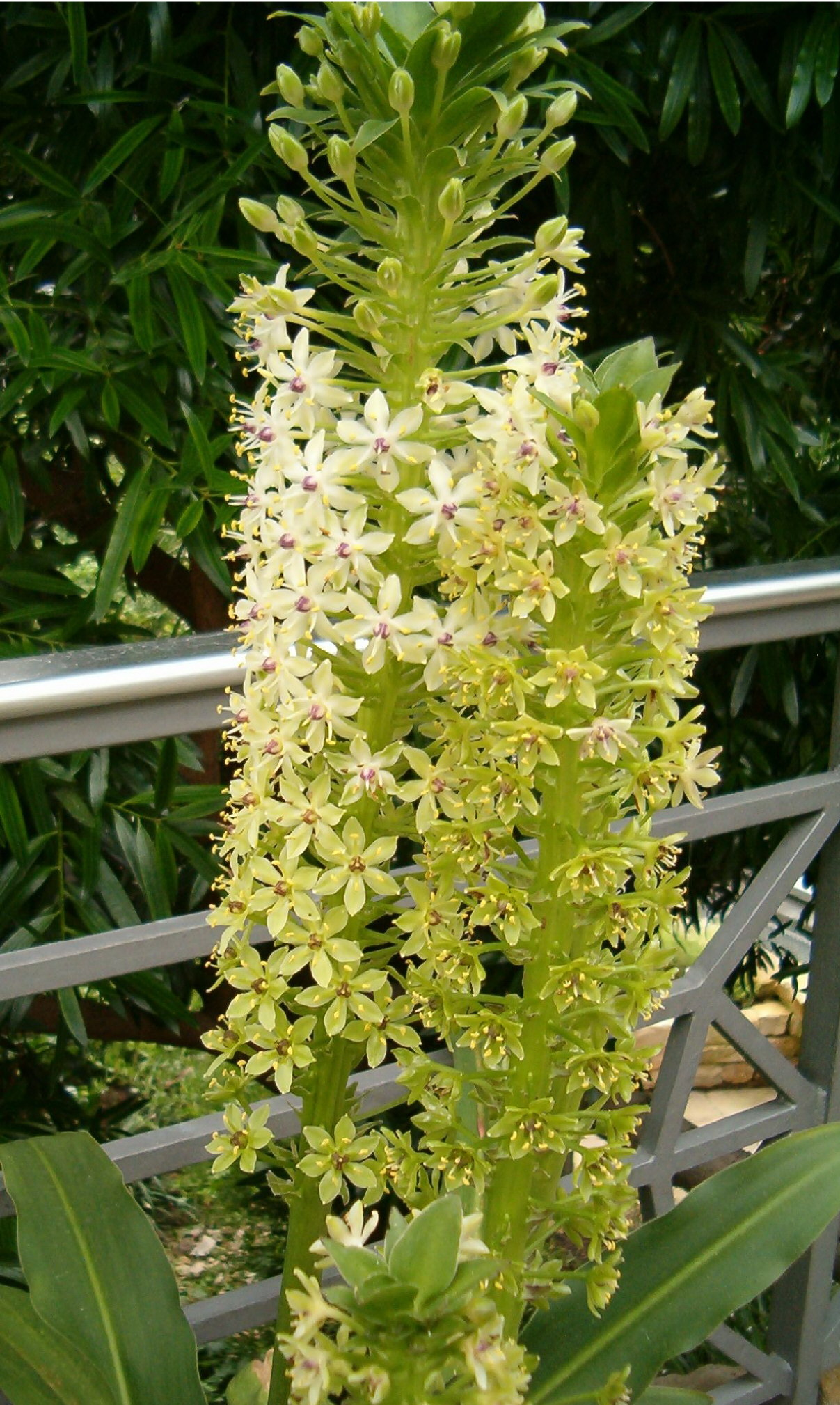
- In the Berlin Botanical Garden

Scientific classification
- Kingdom: Plantae
- Clade: Tracheophytes
- Clade: Angiosperms
- Clade: Monocots
- Order: Asparagales
- Family: Asparagaceae
- Subfamily: Scilloideae
- Genus: Eucomis
- Species: E. pallidiflora

Binomial name
- Eucomis pallidiflora Baker

= Eucomis pallidiflora =

Species of flowering plant

Eucomis pallidiflora, the giant pineapple lily, is a bulbous species of flowering plant in the family Asparagaceae, subfamily Scilloideae, native to southern Africa (South Africa, Lesotho and Eswatini). The white to green flowers appear in summer and are arranged in a spike (raceme), topped by a "head" of green leaflike bracts. Some forms reach almost 2 m (6 ft 7 in) when in flower. The species is cultivated as an ornamental plant, although it is not hardy in areas where severe frosts occur.

== Description ==
Eucomis pallidiflora is a perennial growing from a large bulb with a diameter of up to 8 cm (3 1/4 in). It has a basal rosette of strap-shaped leaves, about 50–60 cm (20–24 in) long and 10–20 cm (4–8 in) wide, with minutely serrated margins. The inflorescence, produced in late summer (August in the UK), is a dense raceme, reaching an overall height of 50–180 cm (1 ft 8 in – 5 ft 11 in), almost 2 m (6 ft 7 in) in some forms. The individual flowers have white, greenish yellow or green tepals and a green ovary. The inflorescence is topped by a head (coma) of up to 30 bracts, sometimes quite small. The plant lacks the purple coloration found other large species of Eucomis, such as Eucomis comosa.

== Taxonomy ==
Eucomis pallidiflora was first described by John Gilbert Baker in 1887. The Latin specific epithet pallidiflora means "pale flowered". It is one of a group of larger tetraploid species of Eucomis, with 2n = 4x = 60.

Two subspecies are recognized by the World Checklist of Selected Plant Families:

- E. pallidiflora subsp. pallidiflora
- E. pallidiflora subsp. pole-evansii (N.E.Br.) Reyneke ex J.C.Manning, formerly treated as a separate species E. pole-evansii

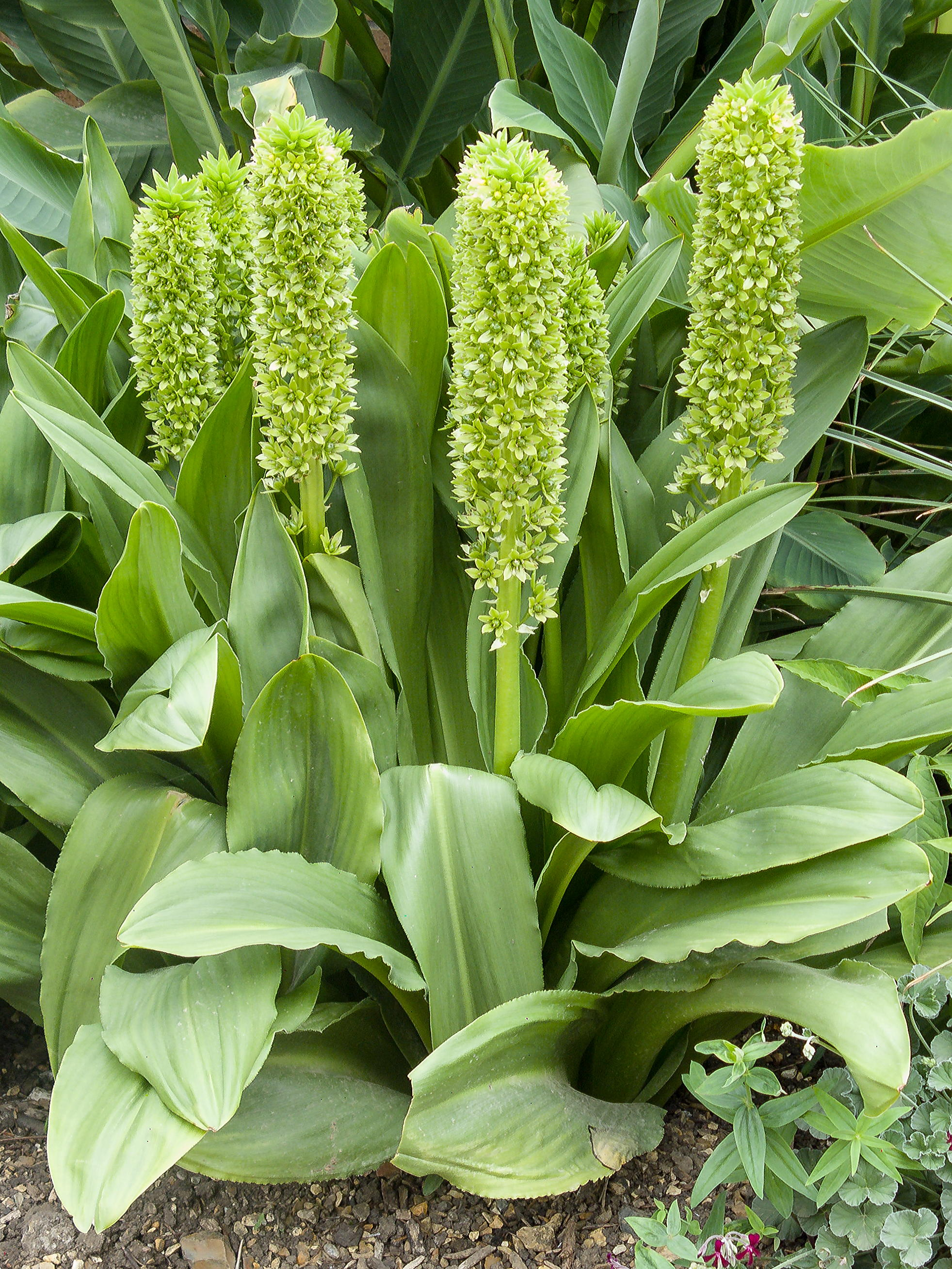
E. pallidiflora subsp. pole-evansii in Cambridge University Botanic Garden

E. pallidiflora subsp. pallidiflora has a relatively densely packed raceme of flowers on a stem (peduncule) up to 47 cm (18 1/2 in) high from the base to the first flower, whereas E. pallidiflora subsp. pole-evansii has a loose raceme on a stem 80–120 cm (31–47 in) long before the first flower. Some sources regard E. pallidiflora subsp. pole-evansii as hardly distinguishable from the typical form.

== Distribution and habitat ==
Eucomis pallidiflora is native to southern Africa – the Cape Provinces, KwaZulu-Natal, the Free State and the Northern Provinces in South Africa, Lesotho and Eswatini. It is found at a range of altitudes, from 915 m (3,000 ft) to 2,080 m (6,800 ft).

== Cultivation ==
The plant is not frost-hardy, and requires a winter mulch in those areas subject to freezing temperatures. It has gained the Royal Horticultural Society's Award of Garden Merit. It flowers in summer (August in cultivation in Britain), remaining upright for two months while the seeds ripen. It can be cultivated in containers where severe frosts occur, kept inside and dry in winter.
