= Creole garden =

Multi-strata agroforestry system

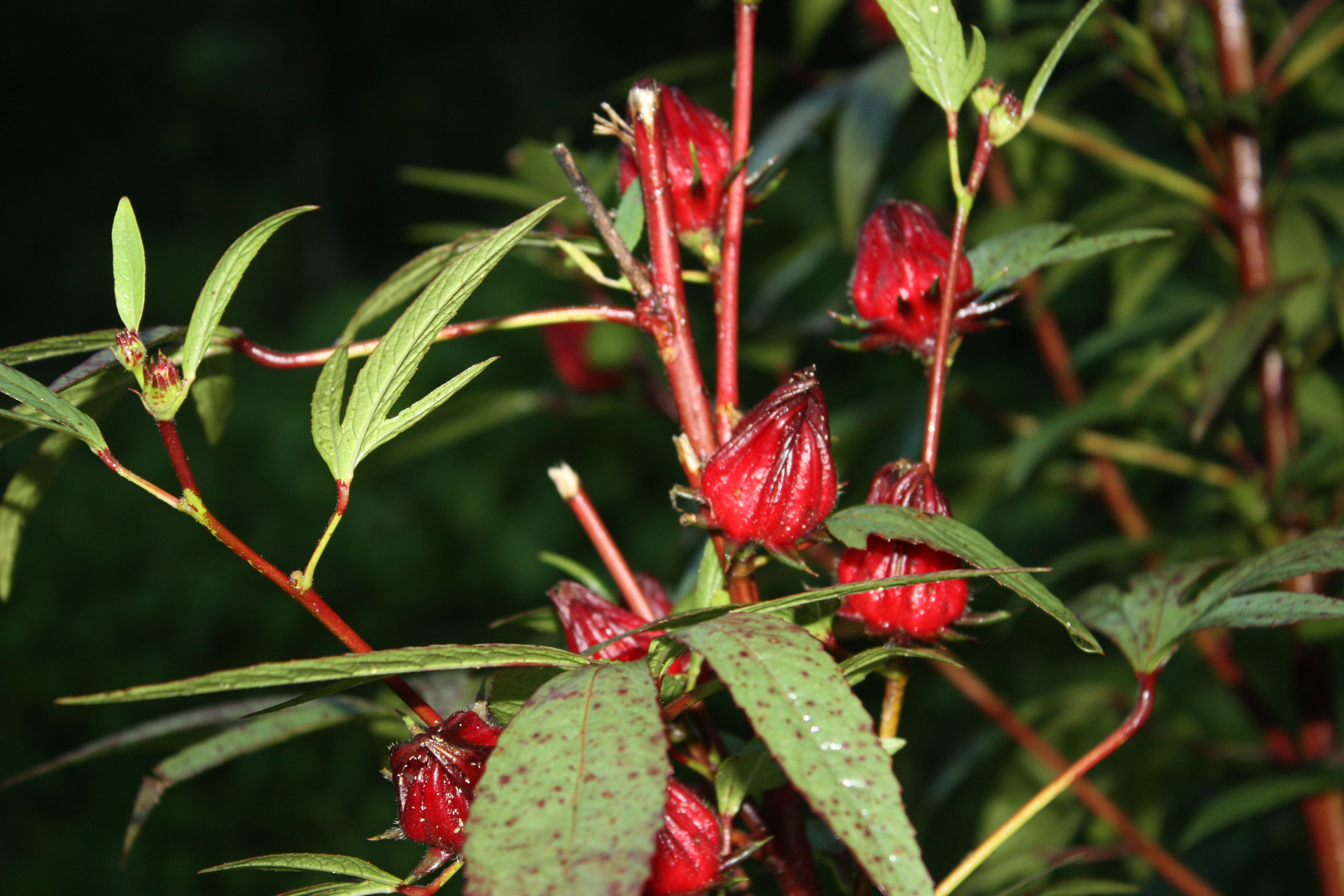
Roselle hibiscus (hibiscus sabdariffa) growing in Martinique.

The Creole garden or jardin de case (hut garden) is a multi-strata, multi-use agroforestry system common in French Guiana, the West Indies and Réunion. It is also known as a door yard garden, back yard garden or kitchen garden. Intended for the production of fruit and vegetables and characterised by the association of a large diversity of different plant species, forming several vegetation layers, from herbaceous plants to trees. It blends Amerindian civilisation with the history of European colonisation; of plots given to enslaved people to support themselves, self-sufficient Maroon settlements and of Chinese and Indian immigration to the West Indies, all of which contribute to the form and purpose of the garden.

The Creole garden is often presented as a model for designing productive and environmentally friendly agroecosystems, for example in the context of agroecology, or ecological intensification. For example, a survey conducted in Guadeloupe, showed that 20 to 123 plant species are cultivated on areas of less than 2,000 square metres (22,000 sq ft). The coexistence of many species with similar utility in the garden stabilises production and spreads risk.

== West Indes ==
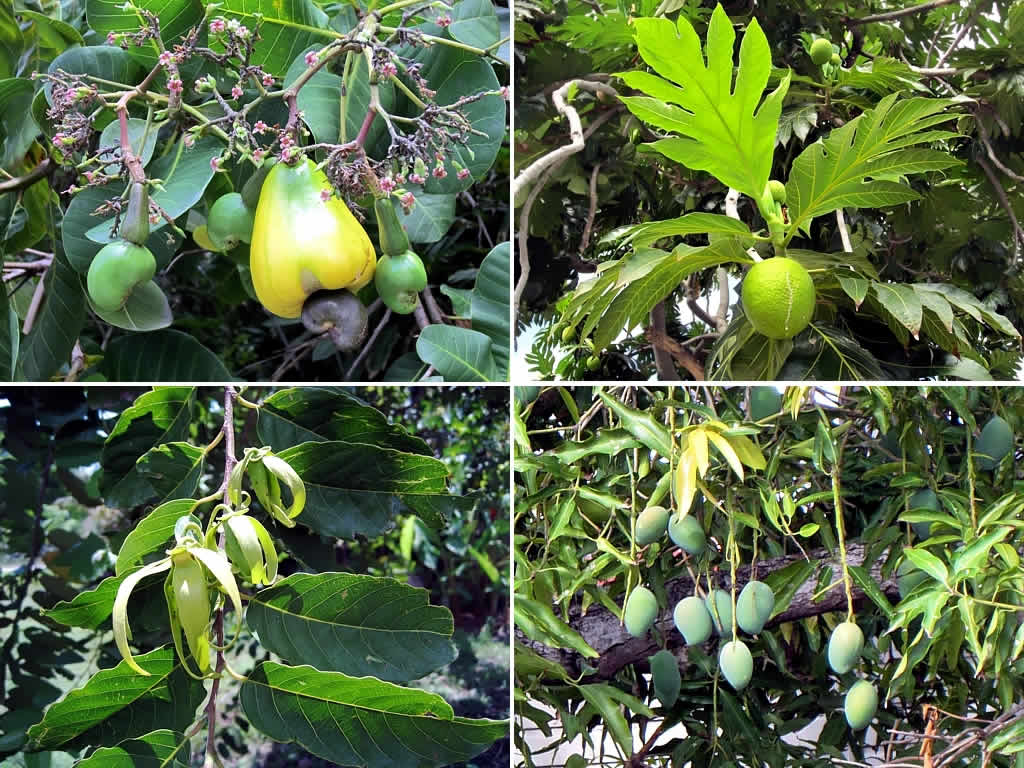
Clockwise from upper left: Cashew, Breadfruit, Mango, Ylang ylang on Montserrat.

In the West Indes, it is often located on sloped land or in the forest. The breadfruit is a staple: a single fruit can feed up to five people. The garden originated from the ichali, a garden created using a slash-and-burn system by the Amerindians. It has since developed into a polycultural approach to food production. The role of medicinal plants varies from island to island.

Gardening is both being encouraged as policy and turned to in some cases as a necessity to address food security in the islands, dependant on extra-regional food imports, risen in cost in recent years due to supply chain issues, war and climate change. During the Second World War, gardens of this kind enabled Guadeloupeans to survive under a blockade of imports under the administration of Constant Sorin.

The Jaden an nou competition begun in Guadeloupe in 2022, introduced cultivation of Creole gardens to the island's school system.

=== Haiti ===
In Haiti, jardin de case are commonly known as jaden lakou. This cropping system continues to make an important contribution to small-scale farming in mountain areas, as the country experiences significant ecological, economic and social pressure. Jaden lakou have a high species diversity, and provide support to food self-sufficiency on Haitian mountain farms.

=== Martinique ===
In Martinique, it includes field and garden areas: horticultural crops are grown inside the fence and field crops outside. Common cultivation techniques include hand-watering, composting, mulching, pruning, use of trellises and simple protection measures from livestock. It can provide fruits, vegetables and herbs for the household, but also medicinal products, fodder for animals, as well as commodities such as wooden poles or bamboo.

== Réunion ==
On Réunion, it is a traditional garden organised around the house, entered through a symbolic architectural element, the baro, or gate, which marks the separation between the street and the kour (courtyard), the name given locally to gardens. Sometimes richly decorated and perforated, it allows passers-by to observe the property.

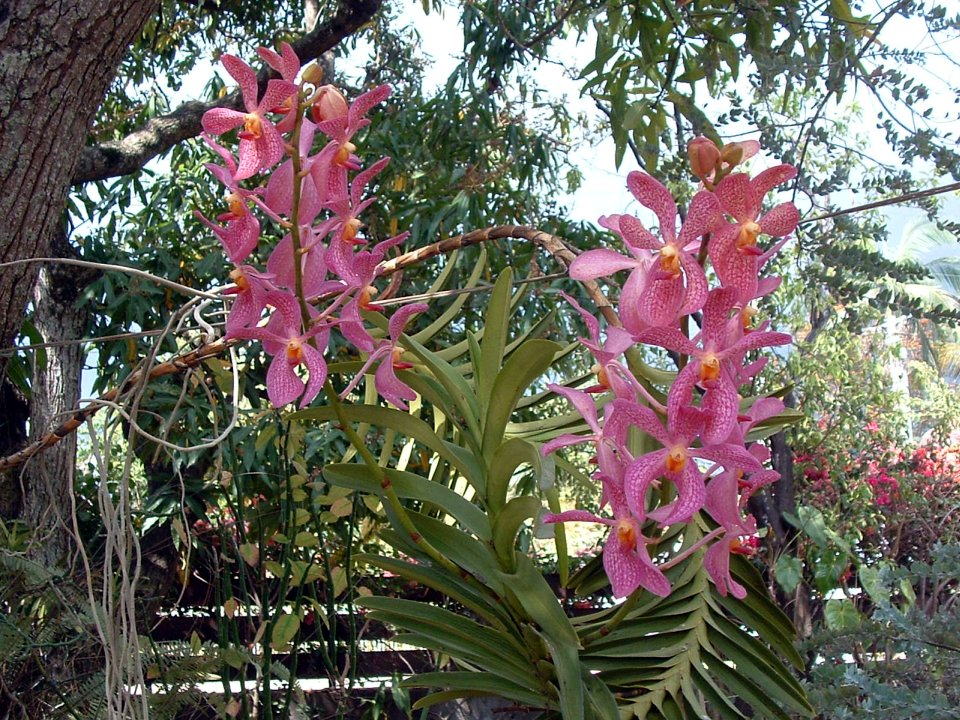
Orchids in a creole garden, growing under shade trees

The kour, in front of the house, is characterised by a symmetry of ornamental plants and trees around a central pathway generally leading to a varangue, and the kour devant, back of the house, which is more intimate and reserved for everyday use: an abundance of medicinal plants, aromatic herbs, fruit trees, etc., are found alongside the boucan. There are also a number of outdoor cooking areas, a wash house and animal shelters. The front of the garden may be planted with pineapple flowers, anthuriums, hibiscus, bougainvillea, Aloe Vera, Rose Geranium, Basil, Curry tree and Kaffir lime. A greenhouse is sometimes dedicated to orchids. Although this type of garden is tending to disappear with the increasing urbanisation of Réunion, it continues to be echoed in urban homes, in the organisation of terraces, and smaller front and back yards, using potted plants.
