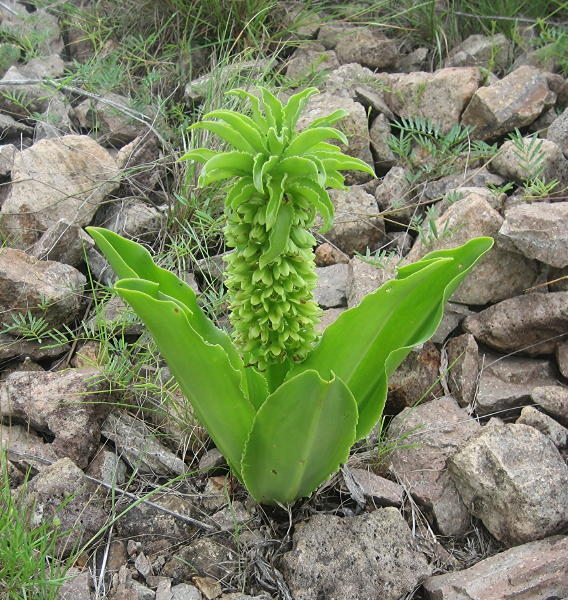
- Eucomis autumnalis

Scientific classification
- Kingdom: Plantae
- Clade: Tracheophytes
- Clade: Angiosperms
- Clade: Monocots
- Order: Asparagales
- Family: Asparagaceae
- Subfamily: Scilloideae
- Genus: Eucomis; L'Hér.

Type species
- Eucomis regia (L.) L'Hér.

Synonyms
- Basilaea Juss. ex Lam.; Eucomea Sol. ex Salisb.

= Eucomis =

Genus of flowering plants

Eucomis is a genus of flowering plants in the family Asparagaceae, subfamily Scilloideae, native to southern Africa. Most species of this genus are commonly referred to as pineapple flowers or pineapple lilies. They are bulbous perennials with basal rosettes of leaves and stout stems covered in star-shaped flowers with a tuft of green bracts at the top, superficially resembling a pineapple – hence the common names.

== Taxonomy ==
The genus Eucomis was first published by Charles L'Héritier in 1789. The name Eucomis is of Greek origin, eu- meaning "pleasing" and kome "hair of the head", thus referring to the tuft of leaf-like bracts that crown the inflorescence of the species in this genus. The name was first used by Daniel Solander, who decided that Linnaeus's Fritillaria regia should be placed in a separate genus. However, Solander died before publishing the name, and was not mentioned by L'Héritier in his 1789 publication. Initially, three species were placed in Eucomis: E. regia, E. nana and E. punctata. (The last two are now synonyms of E. regia and E. comosa respectively.)

=== Classification ===
Eucomis is placed in the subfamily Scilloideae of the family Asparagaceae by those who use the APG system of plant classification, and in the family Hyacinthaceae by those who use more narrowly defined families. Using the subfamily Scilloideae, Eucomis is placed in the tribe Hyacintheae, subtribe Massoniinae, along with such genera as Lachenalia, Ledebouria, Massonia and Veltheimia.

The species can be divided into two groups. One consists of seven mainly short, diploid species with 2n = 2x = 30 chromosomes: E. amaryllidifolia, E. bicolor, E. grimshawii, E. regia, E. schijffii, E. vandermerwei and E. zambesiaca. The other consists of five mainly larger, tetraploid species with 2n = 4x = 60 chromosomes: E. autumnalis, E. comosa, E. humilis, E. montana and E. pallidiflora. The ploidy of E. sonnetteana is not known.

=== Species ===
The genus includes 13 accepted species.

Image	Species
	Eucomis amaryllidifolia
	Eucomis autumnalis
	Eucomis bicolor
	Eucomis comosa
	Eucomis grimshawii
	Eucomis humilis
	Eucomis montana
	Eucomis pallidiflora
	Eucomis regia
	Eucomis schijffii
	Eucomis sonnetteana
	Eucomis vandermerwei
	Eucomis zambesiaca

== Distribution and habitat ==
Eucomis is native to South Africa, Botswana, Lesotho, Eswatini, Zimbabwe and Malawi. Species can be found in grassland, forest, swamps and on river banks, but are absent from the drier regions. The smaller species are more often found at higher elevations, on hilltops or other exposed places; the larger species favour less exposed habitats, such as damp gulleys and streamsides.

== Cultivation ==
Eucomis species are cultivated as ornamental plants. Most of the summer-flowering species will tolerate frost down to −5 to −10 °C (23 to 14 °F) when dormant in winter, provided they are kept dry. They flower best if given both sun exposure and moisture in summer. Eucomis regia grows in winter and flowers in early spring. It needs greenhouse cultivation in regions that, like Britain, have a maritime rather than a Mediterranean climate.

== See also ==
- List of plants known as lily

== Bibliography ==
- Crouch, Neil R. (2010). "An adaptation of Reyneke's key to the genus Eucomis" (PDF). PlantLife (39 & 40): 45–52. Archived from the original (PDF) on 2021-08-10.
- Duncan, Graham (April 2013). "755. Eucomis amaryllidifolia". Curtis's Botanical Magazine. 30 (1): 49–55. doi:10.1111/curt.12016.
- Duncan, Graham (2007). "Lesser-known Eucomis". The Plantsman. New Series. 6 (2): 98–103.
- Duncan, Graham (October 2011). "712. Eucomis vandermerwei". Curtis's Botanical Magazine. 28 (3): 176–189. doi:10.1111/j.1467-8748.2011.01744.x.
