= Graham Duncan (botanist) =

South African botanist and specialist bulb horticulturalist

Graham Dugald Duncan
- Born: 28 November 1959 (age 66)
- Citizenship: South African
- Education: University of KwaZulu-Natal
- Known for: South African geophytes
- Awards: Herbert Medal; Recht Malan Prize
- Scientific career
- Fields: Botany and horticulture
- Workplaces: SANBI, Kirstenbosch
- Author abbrev. (botany): G.D.Duncan

Graham Dugald Duncan (born 28 November 1959) is a South African botanist and specialist bulb horticulturalist at the Kirstenbosch National Botanical Garden, Cape Town, South Africa.

== Life ==
Graham Duncan was born in 1959 and grew up in the Western Cape region amongst its wild bulbous plants. He obtained his early education at the Cape Town Technikon with a National Diploma in horticulture, and joined the Kirstenbosch National Botanical Garden, Cape Town, South Africa in 1978, where he came under the influence of Winsome Fanny Barker (1907–1994), then curator of the Compton Herbarium at Kirstenbosch and a Lachenalia specialist. He earned his MSc (cum laude) in Botany at the University of KwaZulu-Natal, Pietermaritzburg in 2005.

== Work ==
Graham Duncan is a specialist horticulturalist for geophytes and curates the indigenous South African geophytes collection at Kirstenbosch Botanical Garden. These are displayed in the Kay Bergh Bulb House at the Kirstenbosch Conservatory. He is considered an authority on the cultivation, conservation, propagation and biology of bulbs of the Cape region, and the leading expert on the genus Lachenalia. His research deals with the biology and taxonomy of Cape bulbs.

Other than his work on Lachenalia he is known for his expertise on Nerine, Eucomis and Agapanthus. As well as identifying a number of South African plants, he has also bred cultivars such as Clivia miniata 'Kirstenbosch Splendour', which illustrates the cover of the Kirstenbosch centenary book (2013).

He is the author of numerous books, including several titles in the Kirstenbosch Gardening Series, scientific papers and popular articles on South African bulbous plants. He is also a plant collector and plant photographer (see image) and his photographs illustrate his own books and have been published in The Smallest Kingdom: Plants and Plant Collectors at the Cape of Good Hope (2011).

== Awards ==
In 1989, he was awarded the Recht Malan Prize for non-fiction (1989) from the Nasionale Boekhandel for his Bulbous plants of southern Africa and in 2001 he was the recipient of the International Bulb Society's Herbert Medal.

== Legacy ==
Plants for which Duncan is the Botanical authority include many species of Lachenalia, together with W.F.Barker. The International Plant Names Index lists 54 taxa named by him, predominantly species of Lachenalia.

== Selected publications ==
=== Books ===
- Duncan, Graham (1988). The Lachenalia handbook: a guide to the genus, with introductory notes on history, identification and cultivation, with descriptions of the species and colour illustrations. Annals of Kirstenbosch Botanic Gardens, vol. 17. Kirstenbosch, South Africa.: National Botanic Gardens of South Africa. ISBN 9780620119535.
- du Plessis, Niel; Duncan, Graham (1989). Bulbous plants of southern Africa: a guide to their cultivation and propagation. Cape Town: Tafelberg. ISBN 9780624026594. ASIN 0624026590.
- Duncan, Graham (2012). The genus Lachenalia. Botanical Magazine Monographs. Richmond, Surrey: Royal Botanic Gardens, Kew. ISBN 9781842463826.

==== Kirstenbosch Gardening Series ====
- Duncan, Graham (2002). Grow Nerines: a guide to the species, cultivation and propagation of the genus Nerine. Claremont, South Africa: National Botanical Institute, Kirstenbosch. ISBN 9781919684338. Archived from the original on 25 November 2016.
- Duncan, Graham (2008). Grow Clivias: a guide to the species, selected hybrids, cultivation and propagation of the genus Clivia (2nd ed.). Claremont, South Africa: South African National Biodiversity Institute, Kirstenbosch. ISBN 978-1-919684-51-2.
- Duncan, Graham; Brown Louise, Neville; Nurrish, Louise (2013). Grow Proteas: A Guide to the Cultivation and Propagation of South African Proteaceae (2nd ed.). South African National Biodiversity Institute. ISBN 978-1-919976-80-8.
- Crous, Hildegard; Duncan, Graham (2006). Grow Disas: a practical guide to the cultivation and propagation of evergreen and deciduous Disa species of Southern Africa. Claremont, South Africa: South African National Biodiversity Institute, Kirstenbosch. ISBN 9781919684505.
- Duncan, Graham (1998). Grow Agapanthus: a guide to the species, cultivation and propagation of the genus Agapanthus. Claremont, South Africa: National Botanical Institute, Kirstenbosch. ISBN 978-1919684147. ASIN 191968414X.
- Duncan, Graham (2010) [2000]. Grow Bulbs: a guide to the species, cultivation and propagation of South African bulbs (2nd ed.). Cape Town: National Botanical Institute, Kirstenbosch. ISBN 978-1919684260.

=== Articles ===
- Zonneveld, B. J. M.; Duncan, G. D. (March 2006). "Genome size for the species of Nerine Herb. (Amaryllidaceae) and its evident correlation with growth cycle, leaf width and other morphological characters". Plant Systematics and Evolution. 257 (3–4): 251–260. Bibcode:2006PSyEv.257..251Z. doi:10.1007/s00606-005-0381-x. S2CID 31666264.
- Zonneveld, B. J. M.; Duncan, G. D. (10 December 2009). "Genome sizes of Eucomis L'Hér. (Hyacinthaceae) and a description of the new species Eucomis grimshawii G.D.Duncan & Zonneveld". Plant Systematics and Evolution. 284 (1–2): 99–109. doi:10.1007/s00606-009-0236-y.

== Bibliography ==
=== Books and monographs ===
- Anderson, Neil O., ed. (2007). Flower breeding and genetics: issues, challenges and opportunities for the 21st century. Dordrecht: Springer. ISBN 9781402065699.
- Glen, H F; Germishuizen, G (2010). Botanical Exploration of Southern Africa (PDF). Strelitzia. Vol. 26 (2nd ed.). Pretoria: South African National Biodiversity Institute, SANBI. ISBN 978-1-919976-54-9. Archived from the original (PDF) on 28 January 2017.
- Huntley, Brian J. (2013). Kirstenbosch: the most beautiful garden in Africa. Penguin South Africa. ISBN 9781431701179. Archived from the original on 17 November 2016.
- Kamenetsky, Rina; Okubo, Hiroshi, eds. (2012). Ornamental Geophytes: From Basic Science to Sustainable Production. CRC Press. ISBN 978-1-4398-4924-8.
- Manning, John C.; Goldblatt, Peter (2010). Botany and horticulture of the genus Freesia (Iridaceae). Strelitzia. Vol. 27. Pretoria: South African National Biodiversity Institute, SANBI. ISBN 978-1-919976-58-7.
- RHS (2008). RHS A-Z encyclopedia of garden plants. United Kingdom: Dorling Kindersley. p. 1136. ISBN 978-1405332965.

=== Articles and websites ===
- Codd, L. E.; Gunn, M (15 December 1984). "Additional biographical notes on plant collectors in southern Africa". Bothalia. 15 (3/4): 631–654. doi:10.4102/abc.v15i3/4.1832.
- Hutchinson, Jonathan (May 2008). "Grow Disas - by Hildegard Crous and Graham Duncan". Curtis's Botanical Magazine. 25 (2): 190–191. doi:10.1111/j.1467-8748.2008.00617_3.x.
- SANBI (17 November 2010). "New and Expanded edition of Grow Bulbs book now available". News. SANBI, Kirstenbosch. Archived from the original on 18 November 2016., at SANBI (2016)
- "South African National Biodiversity Institute (SANBI)". 2016.
- "Kirstenbosch"., at SANBI (2016)
- "Kirstenbosch Conservatory: Kay Bergh Bulb House". 27 May 2015., at SANBI (2016)
- RHS (2008a). "Report of the Proceedings of a Hardy Nerine Study Day" (PDF). RHS Herbaceous Plant Committee and the Nerine & Amaryllid Society.
- "PlantZAfrica". SANBI.
- Harrower, Adam (December 2011). "Lachenalia lutea G.D. Duncan". Archived from the original on 24 May 2016., in PlantZAfrica (2016)
- Hartigh, Wilma den (17 January 2013). "Kirstenbosch celebrated in print". Media Club South Africa. Archived from the original on 17 November 2016.
- Fraser, Mike; Fraser, Liz (2011). "Photographic Credits". The Smallest Kingdom: Plants and Plant Collectors at the Cape of Good Hope. Archived from the original on 16 October 2016.
- "Herbert Medallists (1937–2007)". International Bulb Society. Archived from the original on 25 August 2006.
- "JStor Global Plants". 2016.

=== Works by Graham Duncan ===
- Duncan, Graham (November 2003). "Plate 475. Ammocharis nerinoides Amaryllidaceae". Curtis's Botanical Magazine. 20 (4): 196–201. doi:10.1111/1467-8748.00394.
- Duncan, Graham (February 2005). "515. Bartholina burmanniana. Orchidaceae" (PDF). Curtis's Botanical Magazine. 22 (1): 25–31. doi:10.1111/j.1355-4905.2005.00458.x.
- Duncan, Graham (October 2011). "715. Ceratotheca triloba" (PDF). Curtis's Botanical Magazine. 28 (3): 205–212. doi:10.1111/j.1467-8748.2011.01747.x. Archived from the original (PDF) on 27 November 2016.
- Duncan, Graham (November 2003). "Plate 474. Cyrtanthus guthrieae Amaryllidaceae". Curtis's Botanical Magazine. 20 (4): 190–195. doi:10.1111/1467-8748.00393.
- Duncan, Graham (April 2013). "755. Eucomis amaryllidifolia". Curtis's Botanical Magazine. 30 (1): 49–55. doi:10.1111/curt.12016.
- Duncan, Graham (October 2011). "712. Eucomis vandermerwei". Curtis's Botanical Magazine. 28 (3): 176–189. doi:10.1111/j.1467-8748.2011.01744.x.
- Duncan, G. (15 December 1998). "Five new species of Lachenalia (Hyacinthaceae) from arid areas of Namibia and South Africa". Bothalia. 28 (2): 131–139. doi:10.4102/abc.v28i2.630.
- Duncan, G. D.; Edwards, T. J. (15 December 2006). "Three new species of Lachenalia (Hyacinthaceae: Massonieae) from Western and Northern Cape, South Africa". Bothalia. 36 (2): 147–155. doi:10.4102/abc.v36i2.353.
- Duncan, Graham; Helme, Nick A. (4 December 2014). "Lachenalia arenicola (Asparagaceae: Scilloideae), a new species from western South Africa" (PDF). Phytotaxa. 186 (5): 297–300. doi:10.11646/phytotaxa.186.5.8.
- Duncan, Graham (November 2003). "Plate 477. Lachenalia salteri Hyacinthaceae". Curtis's Botanical Magazine. 20 (4): 208–212. doi:10.1111/1467-8748.00396.
- Duncan, Graham (November 2003). "Plate 476. Lachenalia peersii Hyacinthaceae". Curtis's Botanical Magazine. 20 (4): 202–207. doi:10.1111/1467-8748.00395.
- Duncan, Graham D (2002). "The genus Nerine". Bulbs. 4 (1): 9–15.
- Duncan, Graham D. "The distribution, habitat and conservation status of the species of Nerine". pp. 22–31., in RHS (2008a)
- Duncan, Graham (June 2016). "830. Nerine laticoma subsp. huttoniae". Curtis's Botanical Magazine. 33 (2): 114–124. doi:10.1111/curt.12139.
- Duncan, Graham D. (September 2005). "533. Nerine pusilla". Curtis's Botanical Magazine. 22 (3): 169–175. doi:10.1111/j.1355-4905.2005.00485.x.
- Duncan, Graham D. (November 2009). "648. Nerine humilis". Curtis's Botanical Magazine. 26 (3): 200–209. doi:10.1111/j.1467-8748.2009.01650.x.
- Duncan, Graham D.; Craib, C.L.; Condy, G. (June 2009). "2245. Nerine pancratioides" (PDF). Flowering Plants of Africa. 61: 34–41. Archived from the original (PDF) on 10 May 2017.
- Duncan, Graham D. (September 2014). "792. Nerine bowdenii subsp. wellsii". Curtis's Botanical Magazine. 31 (3): 223–237. doi:10.1111/curt.12076.
- Duncan, Graham (August 2002). "Plate 448. Nerine gaberonensis". Curtis's Botanical Magazine. 19 (3): 173–177. doi:10.1111/1467-8748.00347.
- Duncan, Graham (November 2003). "Endangered Geophytes of the Cape Floral Kingdom". Curtis's Botanical Magazine. 20 (4): 245–250. doi:10.1111/1467-8748.00400.
- Duncan, Graham (December 1999). "Christmas Bells: The cultivation and propagation of Sandersonia aurantiaca" (PDF). Veld & Flora. 85: 178–190.
- Duncan, Graham (March 2015). "Moraea insolens: rare and endangered". Veld & Flora. 101 (1): 19. hdl:10520/EJC168642.
- Duncan, Graham (December 2013). "Fleeting white amaryllid flower at Kirstenbosch: your best shot". Veld & Flora. 99 (4). (Pancratium tenuifolium): 171. hdl:10520/EJC145546.
- Duncan, Graham (2006). "Bulbous wealth at the Cape". The Alpine Gardener. 74: 296315.
- Duncan, Graham (June 2007). "Lesser-known Eucomis". The Plantsman. New Series. 6 (2): 98–103.
- Duncan, Graham (2011). Cultivation and propagation of Freesia species. pp. 96–103., in Manning & Goldblatt (2010)
- Duncan, Graham (17 September 2012). Geophyte research and production in South Africa. CRC Press. pp. 485–504. ISBN 9781439849248., in Kamenetsky & Okubo (2012)
