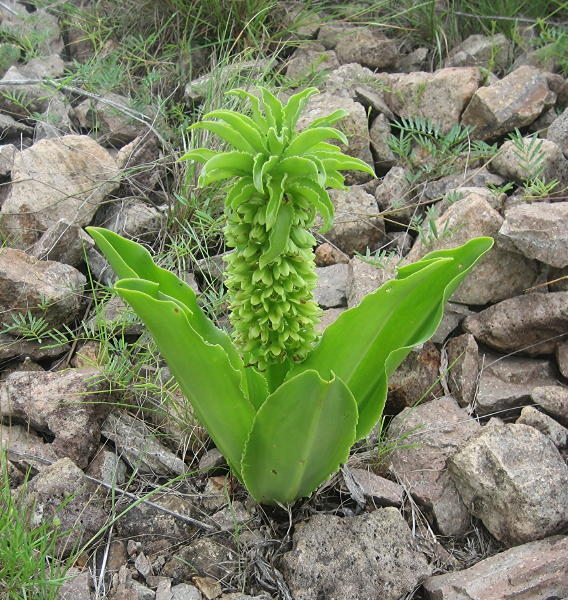

Scientific classification
- Kingdom: Plantae
- Clade: Tracheophytes
- Clade: Angiosperms
- Clade: Monocots
- Order: Asparagales
- Family: Asparagaceae
- Subfamily: Scilloideae
- Genus: Eucomis
- Species: E. autumnalis

Binomial name
- Eucomis autumnalis (Mill.) Chitt.

Subspecies
- See text.

Synonyms
- Fritillaria autumnalis Mill.; Subsp. autumnalis: Fritillaria longifolia Hill; Eucomis undulata Aiton; Ornithogalum undulatum (Aiton) Thunb.; Basilaea undulata (Aiton) Mirb.; Subsp. clavata: Eucomis clavata Baker; Eucomis robusta Baker

= Eucomis autumnalis =

Species of flowering plant

Eucomis autumnalis, the autumn pineapple flower, or autumn pineapple lily, is a species of flowering plant in the family Asparagaceae, subfamily Scilloideae, native to Malawi, Zimbabwe and southern Africa. It is a mid to late summer flowering deciduous bulbous perennial. The flower stem reaches about 40 cm (16 in), rising from a basal rosette of wavy-edged leaves. The green, yellow or white flowers are arranged in a spike (raceme), topped by a "head" of green leaflike bracts. It is grown as an ornamental garden plant and can also be used as a cut flower.

== Description ==
Eucomis autumnalis is a perennial growing from a large bulb with a diameter of up to 8–10 cm (3 1/4–4 in). Like other Eucomis species, it has a basal rosette of strap-shaped leaves. These are up to 55 cm (22 in) long and 6–13 cm (2 1/2–5 in) wide, with a wavy margin. The sweetly scented inflorescence, produced in late summer, is a dense raceme, reaching an overall height of 30–45 cm (1 ft 0 in – 1 ft 6 in). The individual flowers have green, yellow-green or white tepals and are borne on short stalks (pedicels) 2–10 mm (1/8–3/8 in) long. The filaments of the stamens are joined at the base to form a slightly cup-shaped structure. The inflorescence is topped by a head (coma) of green bracts, up to 65 mm (2 1/2 in) long. The plant has no purple coloration. The structure of the seed capsule distinguishes the two subspecies: E. autumnalis subsp. autumnalis has a thin-walled and often somewhat inflated capsule; E. autumnalis subsp. clavata has a capsule with a hard double-layered wall (pericarp). It also has a somewhat club-shaped (clavate) scape, narrowing towards the base.

== Taxonomy ==
Eucomis autumnalis was first described by Philip Miller in 1768, as Fritillaria autumnalis. It was formally transferred to Eucomis by Frederick James Chittenden in 1951. The specific epithet autumnalis refers to its flowering and fruiting time, and distinguishes it from Eucomis regia which flowers in early spring. It is one of a group of larger tetraploid species of Eucomis, with 2n = 4x = 60.

=== Subspecies ===
The species includes two subspecies:

- Eucomis autumnalis subsp. autumnalis
- Eucomis autumnalis subsp. clavata (Baker) Reyneke

E. undulata (the specific epithet referring to the wavy-edged leaves) is a name sometimes used, but is now regarded as a synonym of E. autumnalis subsp. autumnalis. An earlier recognized subspecies, E. autumnalis subsp. amaryllidifolia, is now accepted as a separate species, Eucomis amaryllidifolia.

== Distribution and habitat ==
Eucomis autumnalis is found from Malawi to the Cape Provinces of South Africa. E. autumnalis subsp. autumnalis has been recorded from Malawi, Zimbabwe, and, in South Africa, from the Northern Provinces, the Free State and the Cape Provinces. E. autumnalis subsp. clavata has a more central distribution, being found in Botswana, Eswatini, Lesotho, KwaZulu-Natal, the Free State and the Northern Provinces.

E. autumnalis subsp. clavata tends to be found at high altitudes. On the Drakensberg escarpment, it grows in grassland at 3,000 m (9,800 ft) where it is subject to cold winters and exposure.

== Cultivation ==
Eucomis autumnalis is grown as an ornamental plant. The flowers and later the fruiting stems remain decorative for many weeks, and can be used as cut flowers. E. autumnalis survives frosts down to about −7 °C (19 °F), particularly if planted in a sheltered position in well-drained soil, kept as dry as possible during the winter dormancy. It grows and flowers best planted in full sun or partial shade in a fertile soil, and kept well watered during the summer period of growth and flowering.

A cultivar is available under the name "E. autumnalis 'White Dwarf'". However, as of 2018, the RHS Plant Finder regards this as a cultivar of E. zambesiaca rather than E. autumnalis.

=== Propagation ===
Eucomis autumnalis can be propagated from seed sown in spring, but may take up to five seasons to flower. The bulb may produce offsets, which can be removed while the plant is dormant. The bulblets can then be planted the following spring. Leaf cuttings can be taken while the plant is in active growth. If sections of 5 cm (2 in) each are planted in sterilised and well-drained soil and kept in a humid environment, tiny bulbs should form within a few months. Sterilised bulb scales, leaf bases or flower stalks can also be used in tissue culture.

== Chemistry ==
Various homoisoflavonoids have been isolated from this plant.

== Gallery ==
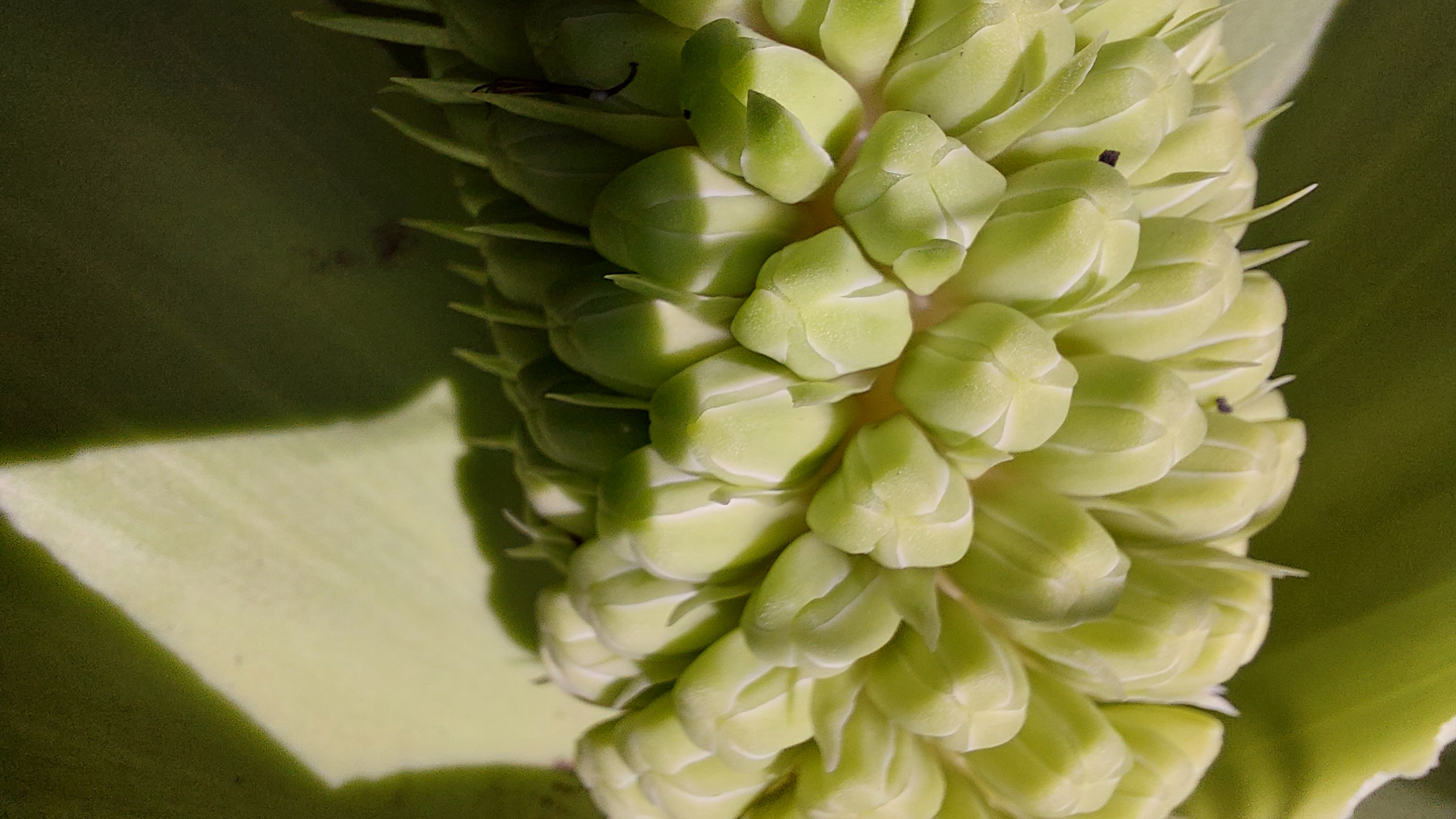
Inflorescence, Flowers budding

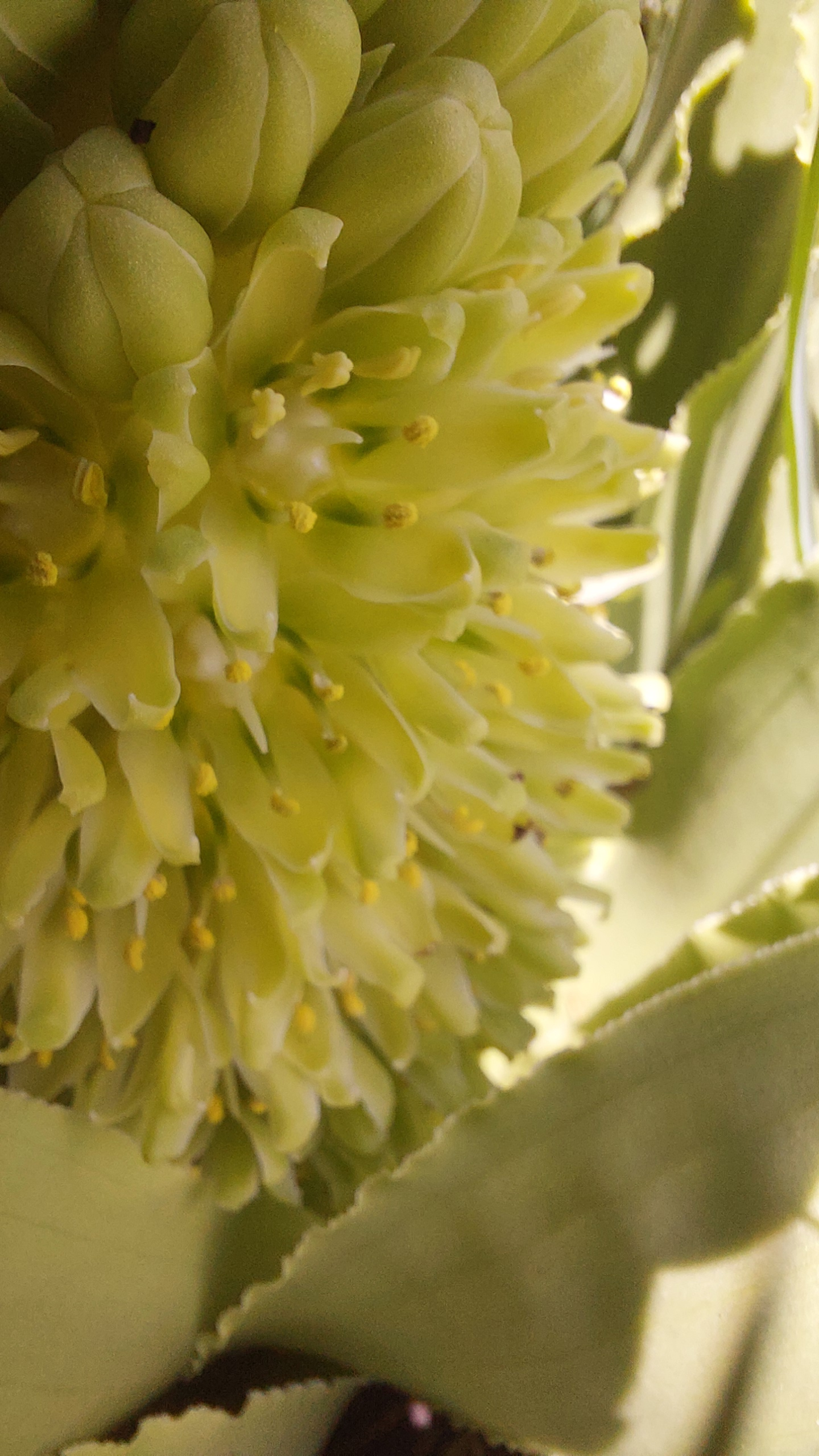
Inflorescence, Flowering

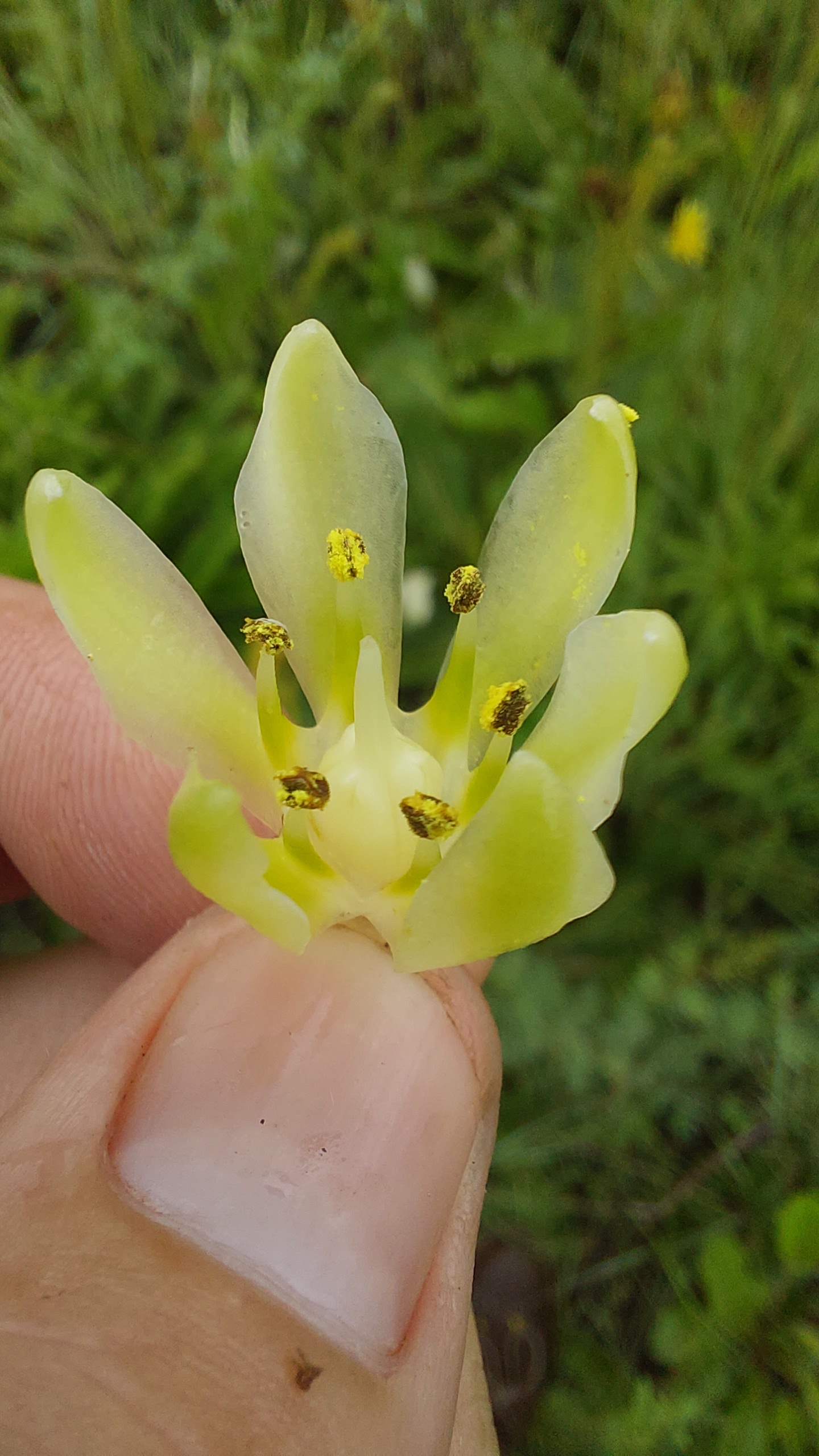
Flower
