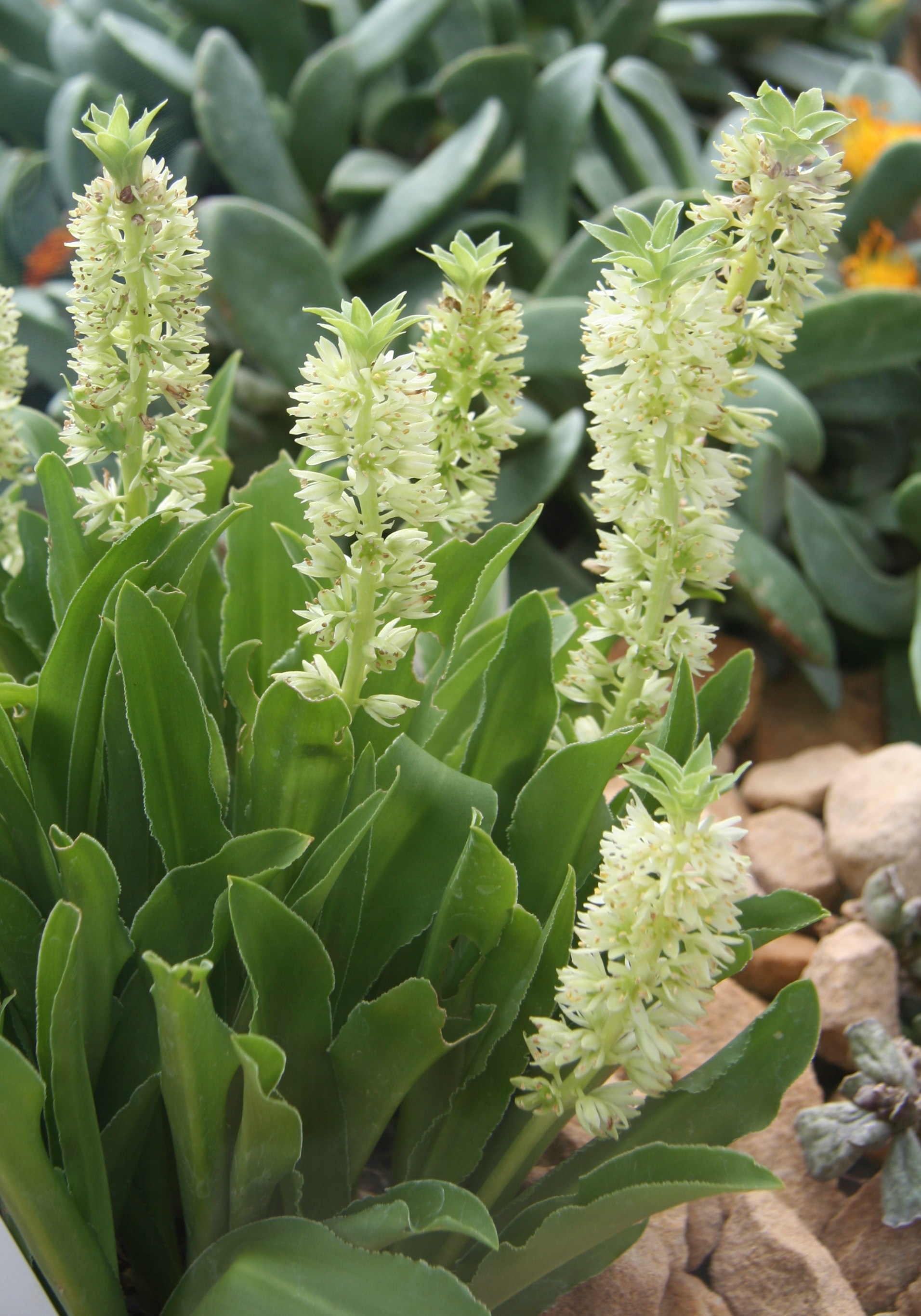
- In cultivation

Scientific classification
- Kingdom: Plantae
- Clade: Tracheophytes
- Clade: Angiosperms
- Clade: Monocots
- Order: Asparagales
- Family: Asparagaceae
- Subfamily: Scilloideae
- Genus: Eucomis
- Species: E. zambesiaca

Binomial name
- Eucomis zambesiaca Baker

= Eucomis zambesiaca =

Species of flowering plant

Eucomis zambesiaca is a bulbous plant in the family Asparagaceae, subfamily Scilloideae, native to southern Africa, from Zimbabwe through Malawi to the Limpopo Province of South Africa. One of the smaller species in the genus, it has a rosette of leaves about 45 cm (18 in) across and white flowers in a spike to about 30 cm (12 in) tall.

== Description ==
Eucomis zambesiaca is a summer-growing bulbous plant reaching about 30 cm (1 ft) in height when in flower. The actual bulb is relatively small, about 3–5 cm (1.2–2.0 in) in diameter, but is attached to an enlarged basal plate. The green leaves reach 30 cm (1 ft) long by 5 cm (2 in) wide. The sweetly scented flowers are white when they open in mid to late summer, turning green later, and are loosely arranged in a raceme on 2–5 mm (0.1–0.2 in) long stalks (pedicels). The raceme, which is variable in width, is topped by a head or "coma" of short, somewhat pointed bracts. The species resembles Eucomis autumnalis, but this has flowers that are yellow-green rather than white when fully open and releasing pollen, angled rather than drooping pedicels, and densely packed rather than well spaced individual flowers.

== Taxonomy ==
Eucomis zambesiaca was collected by John Kirk in 1859 while accompanying David Livingstone on an expedition. It was first described scientifically by John Gilbert Baker in 1886. E. zambesiaca is one of the mainly short, diploid species of Eucomis with 2n = 2x = 30 chromosomes.

== Distribution and habitat ==
Eucomis zambesiaca is native to southern Africa, from Zimbabwe through Malawi to the Limpopo Province of South Africa. It is a highland species; in Zimbabwe it was found growing in short grassland at around 1,900 m (6,200 ft).

== Cultivation ==
Eucomis zambesiaca is grown as an ornamental plant. It has been described as "one of the prettiest species" of Eucomis. It has proved to be frost-hardy in the United Kingdom in well drained soil or dry sites with wall protection. It can also be grown in containers. The bulbs increase readily.

E. zambesiaca 'White Dwarf' is a cultivar listed by the Royal Horticultural Society. It often sold in Europe under the incorrect species name Eucomis autumnalis.
