= Verloren Valei Nature Reserve =

Protected area of South Africa

- Location within Mpumalanga
- Location: Mpumalanga, South Africa
- Nearest city: Dullstroom
- Coordinates: 25.3°S 30.115°E
- Area: 5,891 ha (14,560 acres)
- Website: web.archive.org/web/20090717153143/http://www.mpumalanga.com/parks/verloren.asp

Ramsar Wetland
- Designated: 16 October 2001
- Reference no.: 1110

Verloren Valei Nature Reserve (Lost Valley in English) is a protected area in Mpumalanga, South Africa. One of the few places in the country to breed the three species cranes present in South Africa, the Verloren Vallei Nature Reserve lies roughly 13 km (8.1 mi) outside Dullstroom, a beautiful, peaceful part of the Steenkampsberg plateau that includes rolling grasslands and sensitive wetlands.

Guided tours around the reserve to sight the blue crane, the wattled crane and the Grey crowned crane are by appointment only - the reserve is an international Ramsar wetlands site and enjoys international importance. An interlinked series of over 30 wetlands are home to significant birds, including red data species, so it is understandable that Verloren Vallei Nature Reserve is serious about providing safe refuge to its countless birds. An ongoing project to save the wattle crane from extinction collects the second eggs produced by these birds for incubation. These chicks are then reared in isolation in a specially designed facility on the reserve, looked after by people in crane suits so that they do not imprint on humans. Once they are 6 months old, they are released into the wild in an attempt to boost their dwindling numbers.

Open grasslands are home to the bald ibis, pitpits, larks, cisticolas, Magpie Shrikes, red bishops and finches, whilst the rockier parts of the reserve attract the mountain chat, ground woodpecker, the scarce grey-winged and red-winged francolin and the Cape rock thrush. Verloren Vallei also includes animals such as the oribi, steenbok, brown hyena, caracal, serval cat, jackal, otters and zebras, wildebeest and blesbok have been reintroduced. Plants include the threatened Eucomis vandermerwei, protected within the reserve. But the stars of the show at Verloren Vallei Nature Reserve are the butterflies - attracted to the array of indigenous flowers - the sweet water and, of course, the cranes.
