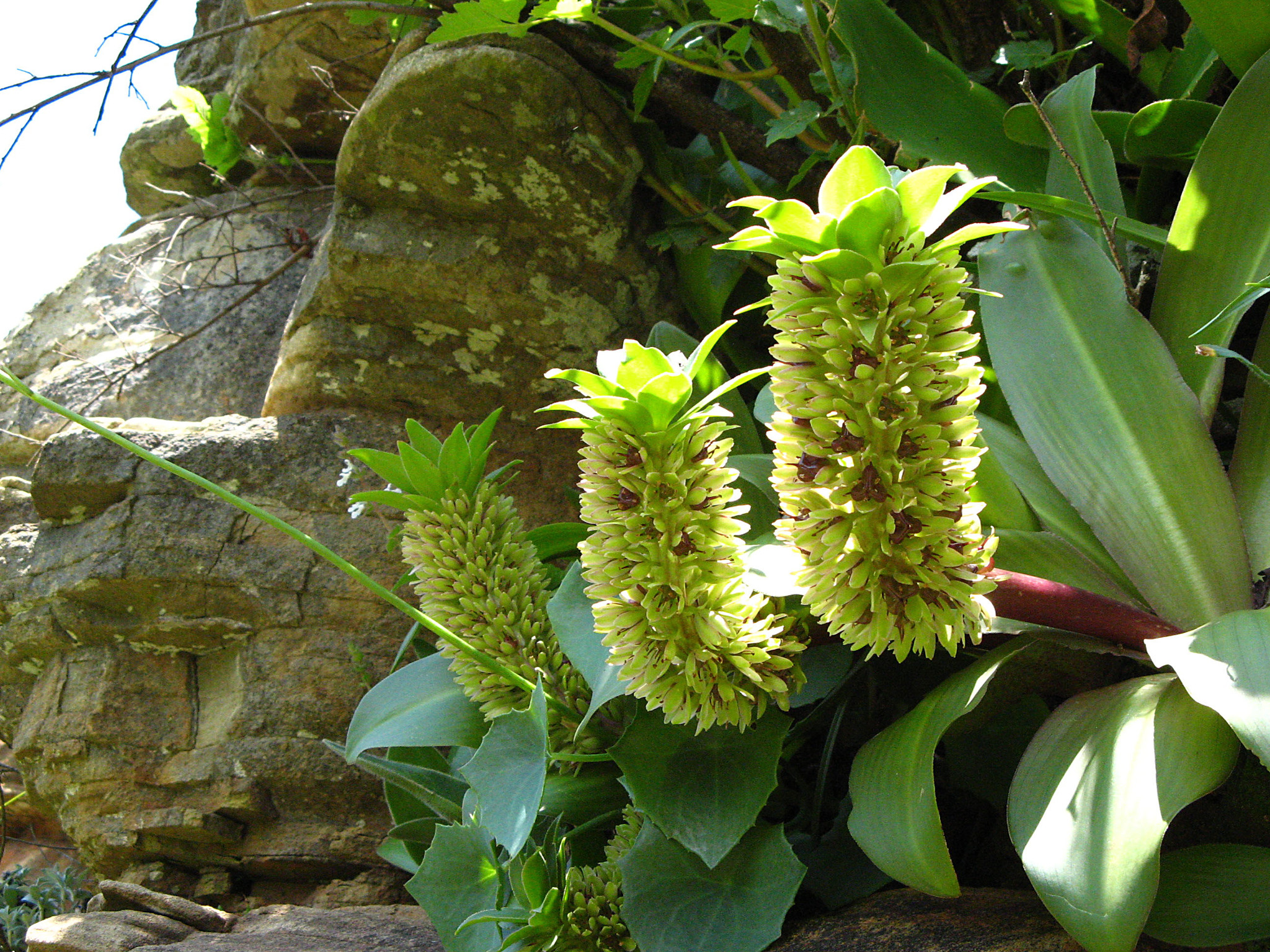

Scientific classification
- Kingdom: Plantae
- Clade: Tracheophytes
- Clade: Angiosperms
- Clade: Monocots
- Order: Asparagales
- Family: Asparagaceae
- Subfamily: Scilloideae
- Genus: Eucomis
- Species: E. humilis

Binomial name
- Eucomis humilis Baker

= Eucomis humilis =

Species of flowering plant

Eucomis humilis is a species of flowering plant in the family Asparagaceae, subfamily Scilloideae, native to KwaZulu-Natal and Lesotho. It was first described by Baker in 1895. The greenish to purplish flowers appear in summer and are arranged in a spike (raceme), topped by a "head" of green leaflike bracts. Cultivated as an ornamental plant, it can be grown successfully outside where frosts are not too severe.

== Description ==
Eucomis humilis is a short summer-growing bulbous plant. Its bulb is ovoid, 3–5 cm (1 1/8–2 in) across. Six to eight leaves emerge from the bulb, each about 35 cm (14 in) long and 6–10 cm (2 1/2–4 in) across. The bases of the leaves are sometimes spotted underneath. The margins are variously described as smooth without undulations or wavy-edged. The flowers are arranged in a short, rather slender raceme on a stem (peduncule) 20–30 cm (8–12 in) tall. The raceme is topped by a head or "coma" of short bracts. The somewhat unpleasantly scented flowers have six greenish or purplish tepals, and purple stamen filaments. The ovary and the inflated capsule that develops from it are large and reddish purple in colour.

== Taxonomy ==
Eucomis humilis was first described by John Gilbert Baker in 1895. The specific epithet humilis means low-growing or dwarf. Although relatively short, it is one of the usually larger tetraploid species of Eucomis, with 2n = 2x = 60.

== Distribution and habitat ==
Eucomis humilis is found in the South African province of KwaZulu-Natal and in Lesotho. In the Drakensberg alpine regions, it is found in generally damp habitats, such as stream gullies and grassland below cliffs, at altitudes of 2,220–2,900 m (7,280–9,510 ft).

== Cultivation ==
Eucomis humilis is grown as an ornamental garden plant. It can be planted in full sun or semi-shade, preferring nutrient-rich, well-drained soils. It tolerates some degree of frost. Plants collected at 2,500 m (8,200 ft) in South Africa were grown and flowered successfully outside in the south of England at the Royal Botanic Gardens, Kew. It can be propagated from seeds, offsets and leaf cuttings.
