= Eucomis amaryllidifolia =

Scientific classification
- Kingdom: Plantae
- Clade: Tracheophytes
- Clade: Angiosperms
- Clade: Monocots
- Order: Asparagales
- Family: Asparagaceae
- Subfamily: Scilloideae
- Genus: Eucomis
- Species: E. amaryllidifolia

Binomial name
- Eucomis amaryllidifolia Baker

Synonyms
- Eucomis autumnalis subsp. amaryllidifolia (Baker) Reyneke

Species of flowering plant

Eucomis amaryllidifolia is a species of flowering plant in the family Asparagaceae, subfamily Scilloideae, native to the Cape Provinces. It is a short, summer-flowering bulbous plant, with a dense spike (raceme) of yellowish-green flowers topped by a "head" of leafy bracts. In Afrikaans it is called kliplelie ('rock lily').

== Description ==
Eucomis amaryllidifolia is a short summer-growing bulbous plant, 9–20 cm (3 1/2–8 in) tall. Its bulb is more or less spherical, 3–4 cm (1 1/8–1 5/8 in) across, with a dark brown outer tunic. Five or six leaves emerge from the bulb, 13–30 cm (5–12 in) long and 1.5–4 cm (5/8–1 5/8 in) across. The margins of the leaves are wavy. The inflorescence is a densely packed raceme with 30–50 individual flowers. The raceme is topped by a head or "coma" formed from 13 to 20 bracts about 3 cm (1 1/8 in) long. The somewhat sweetly scented flowers have six yellowish green tepals, 6–8 mm (1/4–5/16 in) long by 4–5 mm (5/32–3/16 in) wide. The ovary is greenish yellow. The seeds are glossy and black.

It flowers in summer and early autumn (January to March in its native South Africa).

== Taxonomy ==
Eucomis amaryllidifolia was first described by John Gilbert Baker in 1878. He referred to the leaves as "Amaryllis-like" in contrast with the broader leaves of E. undulata (now a synonym of E. autumnalis), which it otherwise resembled. In 1972, William Frederick Reyneke considered the species to be merely a variety of E. autumnalis, but then, in 1980, elevated it to a subspecies, as E. autumnalis subsp. amaryllidifolia. However, later research showed that E. amaryllidifolia was one of the smaller diploid species of Eucomis, with 2n = 2x = 30, whereas E. autumnalis was one of the larger tetraploid species, with 2n = 4x = 60. Accordingly, E. amaryllidifolia is now accepted as a full species.

== Distribution and habitat ==
Eucomis amaryllidifolia is native to the Cape Provinces of South Africa, and in particular the Eastern Cape, possibly extending into the Orange Free State. It grows on rocky slopes and ridges, in full sun.

== Cultivation ==
Eucomis amaryllidifolia was not in general cultivation as of October 2018. In the Kirstenbosch National Botanical Garden, it is grown in pots in an open, slightly acid medium. The pots are placed in a sunny position and watered well in summer, but kept completely dry in winter. A high potash fertilizer is used. The bulbs are considered to be hardy down to −5 °C (23 °F). Propagation is by seed, bulb slicing, leaf cuttings and tissue culture. Mealybugs can be a significant pest.
