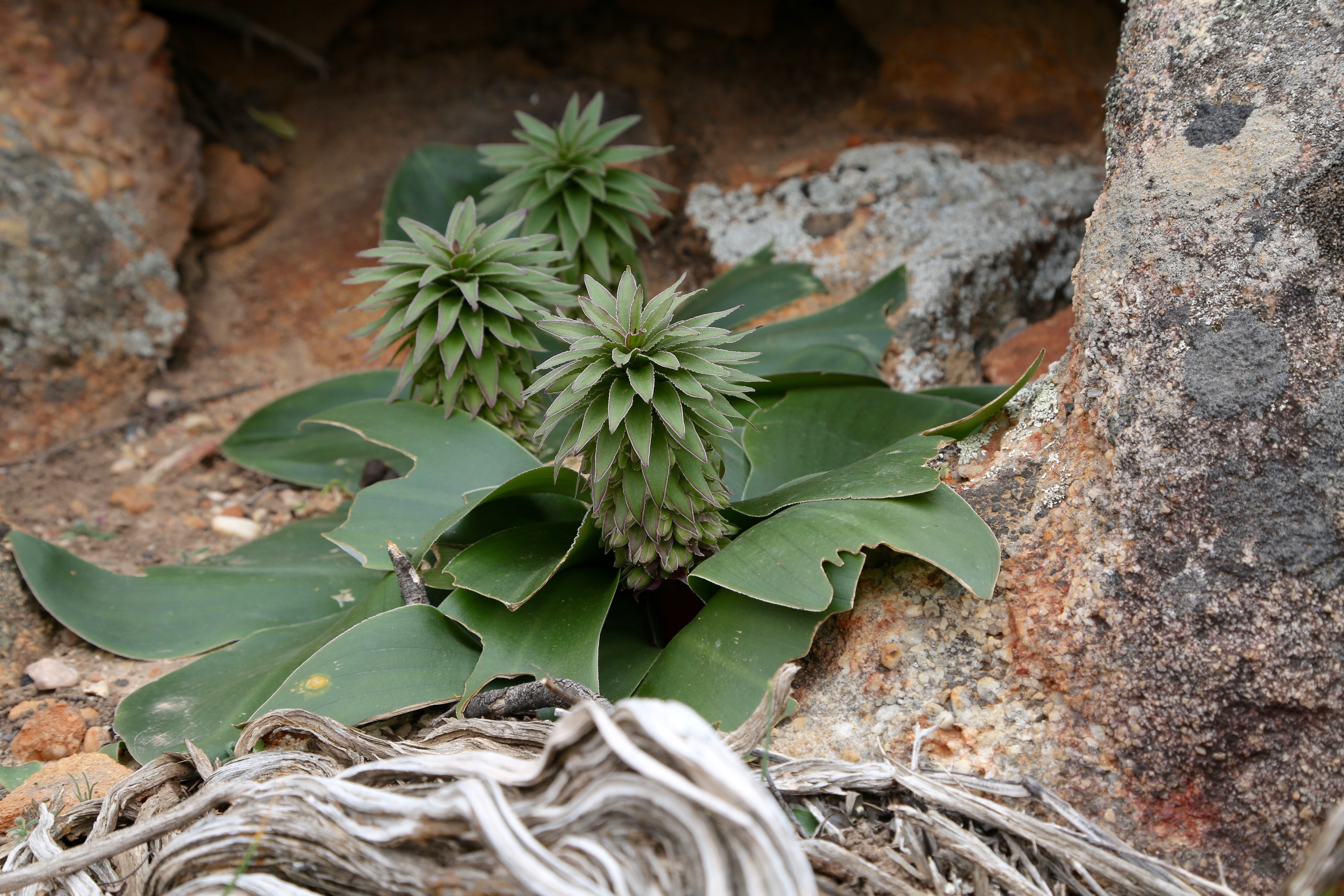

Scientific classification
- Kingdom: Plantae
- Clade: Tracheophytes
- Clade: Angiosperms
- Clade: Monocots
- Order: Asparagales
- Family: Asparagaceae
- Subfamily: Scilloideae
- Genus: Eucomis
- Species: E. regia

Binomial name
- Eucomis regia (L.) L'Hér.

Synonyms
- Fritillaria regia L.; Basilaea regia (L.) Mirb.; Fritillaria nana Burm.f.; Basilaea coronata Lam.; Eucomis nana (Burm.f.) L'Hér.; Ornithogalum nanum (Burm.f.) Thunb.; Eucomea humilis Salisb.; Eucomea regalis Salisb.; Basilaea nana (Burm.f.) Mirb.; Eucomis purpureocaulis Andrews; Eucomis macrophylla Baker; Eucomis pillansii L.Guthrie; Whiteheadia nana (Burm.f.) J.W.Ingram

= Eucomis regia =

Species of flowering plant

Eucomis regia is a species of bulbous flowering plant in the family Asparagaceae, subfamily Scilloideae, native to the Cape Provinces of South Africa. It is sometimes cultivated, but requires protection in a greenhouse in temperate climates.

== Description ==
Eucomis regia is a winter-growing bulbous plant. In flower, it reaches up to 20 cm (8 in) tall or less. It grows from a small ovoid bulb, usually solitary, about 3–5 cm (1 1/4–2 in) across. The leaves are about 10–20 cm (4–8 in) long and 3 cm (1 1/4 in) wide. They have a rough surface, ridged along the leaf veins, and very small indentations along the margins. They lie flat on the ground. E. regia flowers from late winter to early spring, dying down completely during the dry summer. The greenish flowers lack obvious pedicels (stalks), being sunken into the scape (stem). They have an unpleasant smell. The flower spike is topped by a head or "coma" of ovate bracts, long enough in some forms to hide the flowers almost completely.

== Taxonomy ==
The species was first described, as Fritillaria regia, by Carl Linnaeus in 1753. In 1789, Charles L'Héritier transferred it to his new genus Eucomis. Eucomis pillansii has been treated as a separate species or as the subspecies E. regia subsp. pillansii, but is now included in E. regia. E. regia is one of the mainly short, diploid species of Eucomis with 2n = 2x = 30 chromosomes.

== Distribution and habitat ==
Eucomis regia is native to the Cape Provinces of South Africa. It is found in two areas in the south west of the Western Cape and the Northern Cape, in the winter rainfall zone. It is restricted to heavy clay soils in open areas or in renosterveld vegetation, amongst rocks on shaded south-facing hillsides.

== Cultivation ==
Eucomis regia has been described as "possibly the least attractive Eucomis." As it is only half-hardy and requires a completely dry rest in summer, it has to be grown in a greenhouse in regions with temperate climates, such as the British Isles.
