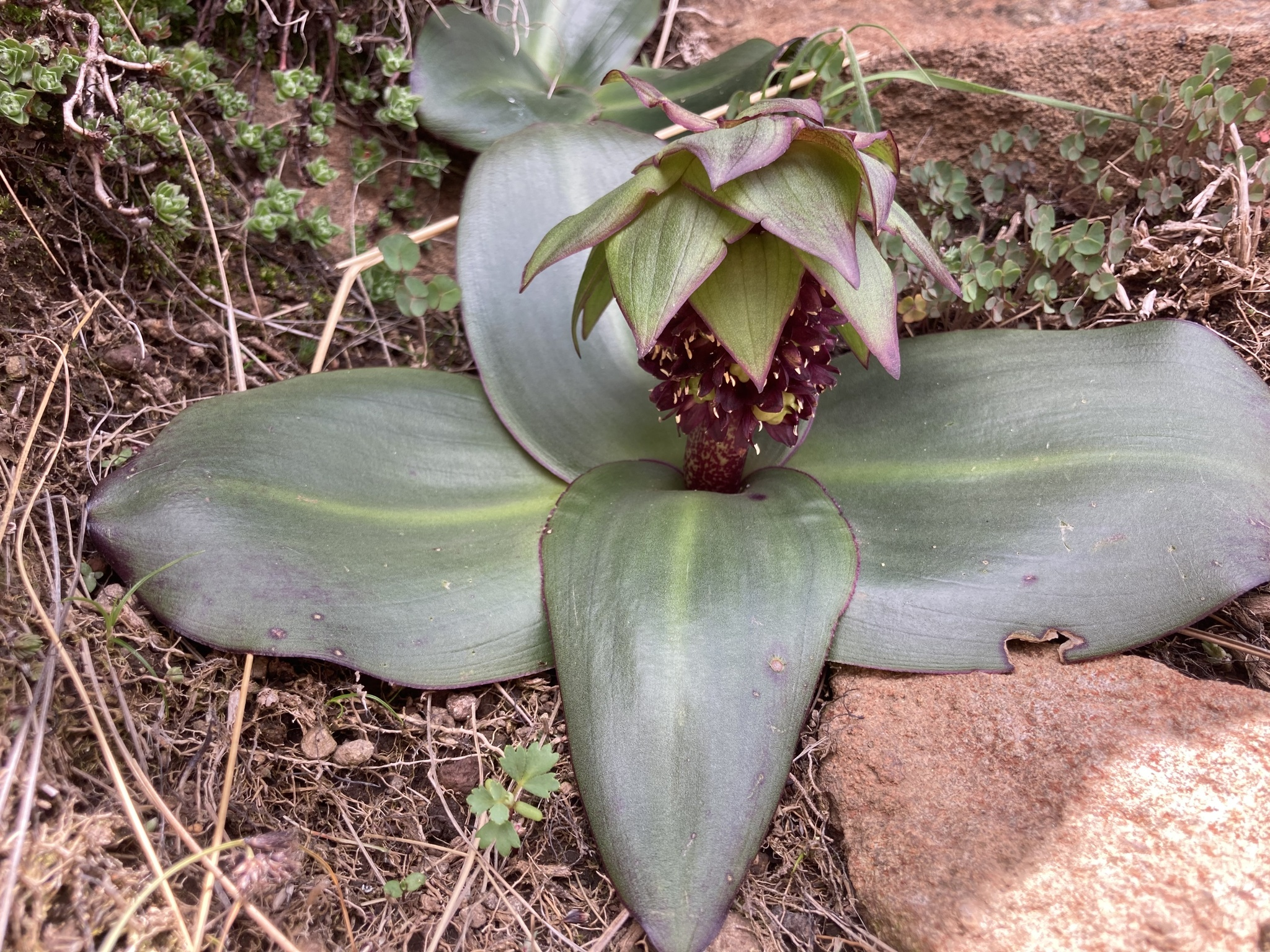

Scientific classification
- Kingdom: Plantae
- Clade: Tracheophytes
- Clade: Angiosperms
- Clade: Monocots
- Order: Asparagales
- Family: Asparagaceae
- Subfamily: Scilloideae
- Genus: Eucomis
- Species: E. schijffii

Binomial name
- Eucomis schijffii Reyneke

= Eucomis schijffii =

Species of flowering plant

Eucomis schijffii is a bulbous species of flowering plant in the family Asparagaceae, subfamily Scilloideae, native to the Cape Provinces, KwaZulu-Natal and Lesotho. It was first described by William Frederick Reyneke in 1976. The reddish purple flowers appear in summer and are arranged in a spike (raceme), topped by a "head" of green leaflike bracts. It is cultivated as an ornamental plant and can be grown successfully outside where frosts are not too severe. The smallest of the species of Eucomis, it is particularly suited to being grown in rock gardens or containers.

== Description ==
Eucomis schijffii is a short summer-growing bulbous plant. The smallest of the species of Eucomis as of 2018, it is about 10–15 cm (4–6 in) tall. Its bulb is globular, 2–4 cm (3/4–1 1/2 in) across. Three to four ovate leaves emerge from the bulb and lie flat on the soil. The leaves are often bluish grey (glaucous), about 5–10 cm (2–4 in) long and 3–7 cm (1–3 in) across, sometimes purple tinged or spotted underneath. The leaf margins are smooth or with very small indentations. The flowers are arranged in a raceme on a purple stem (peduncule) 4–10 cm (1 1/2–4 in) tall. The raceme is topped by a head or "coma" of 10 to 15 ovate bracts that sometimes have purple margins. The unpleasantly scented flowers have six dark reddish purple tepals and purple stamen filaments, and are either sessile or have very short stalks (pedicels). The ovary, and the inflated capsule that develops from it, are greenish, generally with some purple shading.

== Taxonomy ==
Eucomis schijffii was first described in 1976 by William Reyneke, who named it to honour his professor, H. P. van der Schijff. It is one of a group of mainly short, diploid species with 2n = 2x = 30 chromosomes. Its small stature and ovate leaves normally lying flat on the ground, along with purple flowers and stamen filaments, distinguish it from similar dwarf Eucomis species.

== Distribution and habitat ==
Eucomis schijffii is endemic to the Drakensberg mountains of Lesotho and the KwaZulu-Natal and Eastern Cape provinces of South Africa. It occurs up to 3,200 m (10,500 ft), the highest altitude for any Eucomis species. It is found in somewhat shaded, damp rock faces and open rocky grassland where temperatures often fall below freezing in winter.

== Cultivation ==
Eucomis schijffii is cultivated as an ornamental plant. Its small size makes it more suitable for rock gardens or containers, either outside or in a cool greenhouse. An acid growing medium is recommended. It is hardy down to −5 °C (23 °F) if kept dry. It has been grown successfully outside in several locations in Britain. It can be propagated from seed, although seed-raised plants take four to five years to flower. It can also be propagated from leaf cuttings; the base of the leaf produces small bulblets.
