= Ben Zonneveld =

Dutch plant scientist and botanist

BJM Zonneveld
- Born: 1940 (age 85–86)
- Education: Leiden University
- Known for: Tulip; Narcissus
- Scientific career
- Fields: Botany
- Workplaces: Naturalis; Leiden University
- Author abbrev. (botany): Zonn.

Ben Zonneveld (Bernardus Joannes Maria Zonneveld; born 1940) is a Dutch plant scientist and botanist known for his work on the genetics of Tulips and Daffodils, and their infrageneric classification.

== Career ==
Dr Zonneld received his Ph.D. in mathematical sciences (Biology & Genetics) from Leiden in 1972, where he became a Professor of Genetics at the Institute of Biology. He carried out botanical expeditions in southern (1970s-90s), South Africa (2000), and Mexico (2005).

After working at the Institute of Molecular Plant Sciences, Clusius laboratory, University of Leiden, he moved to the herbarium at Naturalis, in the same city.

He has published widely in the field of plant genetics.

== Publications ==
Select publications include:

- Zonneveld, B. J. M. (27 July 2011). "Pine nut syndrome: a simple test for genome size of 12 pine nut–producing trees links the bitter aftertaste to nuts of P. armandii Zucc. ex Endl". Plant Systematics and Evolution. 297 (3–4): 201–206. doi:10.1007/s00606-011-0507-2.
- Zonneveld, B. J. M. (2008). "The systematic value of nuclear DNA content for all species of Narcissus L. (Amaryllidaceae)". Plant Systematics and Evolution. 275 (1–2): 109–132. doi:10.1007/s00606-008-0015-1. hdl:1887/13962.
- Veldkamp, J. F.; Zonneveld, B. J. M. (2011). "The infrageneric nomenclature of Tulipa (Liliaceae)". Plant Systematics and Evolution. 298: 87–92. doi:10.1007/s00606-011-0525-0.
