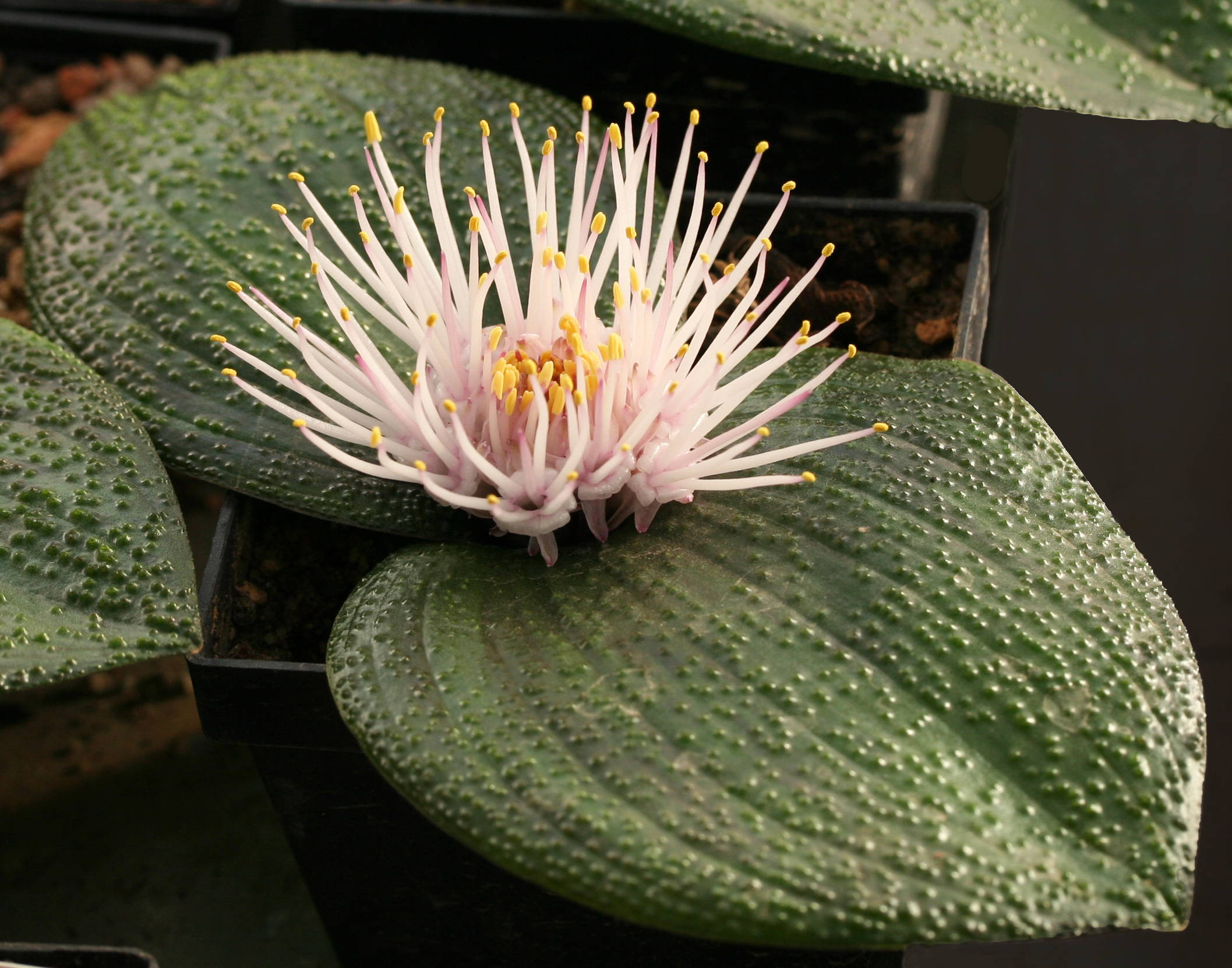
- Massonia pustulata in cultivation

Scientific classification
- Kingdom: Plantae
- Clade: Tracheophytes
- Clade: Angiosperms
- Clade: Monocots
- Order: Asparagales
- Family: Asparagaceae
- Subfamily: Scilloideae
- Tribe: Hyacintheae
- Subtribe: Massoniinae; Benth. & Hook.f., Gen. Pl. 3: 750, 758 (1883)

Type genus
- Massonia Thunb. ex Houtt. Nat. Hist. 2(12): 424. (1780)

Genera
- See text

Synonyms
- Eucomidaceae Salisb.; Lachenaliaceae Salisb.; Lachenaliinae U.Müll.-Doblies & D.Müll.-Doblies, Feddes Repert. 108(1-2): 65. 1997.; Ledebouriinae U.Müll.-Doblies & D.Müll.-Doblies, Feddes Repert. 108(1-2): 56. 1997.; Massonieae

= Massoniinae =

Subtribe of flowering plants

Massoniinae is a flowering plant subtribe in the tribe Hyacintheae.

== Genera ==
- Daubenya
- Drimiopsis
- Eucomis
- Lachenalia
- Ledebouria
- Massonia
- Merwilla
- Resnova
- Schizocarphus
- Spetaea
- Veltheimia
