= Fernandezia robusta =

The taxon Fernandezia robusta refers to 2 species of orchid:

- Fernandezia robusta Klotzsch ex Rchb.f., a synonym of Lockhartia lunifera,
- Fernandezia robusta Bateman, a synonym of Lockhartia oerstedii
