= L. floribunda =

L. floribunda may refer to:

- Lagerstroemia floribunda, a plant native to tropical Southeast Asia
- Lappula floribunda, a borage native to western North America
- Lechenaultia floribunda, an Australian plant
- Ledebouria floribunda, a perennial herb
- Lindera floribunda, a dioecious plant
- Litsea floribunda, a dioecious plant
- Lockhartia floribunda, an epiphytic orchid
- Lophostachys floribunda, a plant native to Brazil
