= Massonia triflora =

Scientific classification
- Kingdom: Plantae
- Clade: Embryophytes
- Clade: Tracheophytes
- Clade: Angiosperms
- Clade: Monocots
- Order: Asparagales
- Family: Asparagaceae
- Subfamily: Scilloideae
- Genus: Massonia
- Species: M. triflora

Binomial name
- Massonia triflora Compton

Synonyms
- Massonia citrina M.Pinter, Deutsch, U.Müll.-Doblies & D.Müll.-Doblies

Species of flowering plant

Massonia triflora is a species of flowering plant in the family Asparagaceae, native to the western Cape Provinces of South Africa. As its synonym Massonia citrina it has gained the Royal Horticultural Society's Award of Garden Merit as an ornamental. Some authorities consider it to be a synonym of Massonia depressa, the hedgehog lily.
