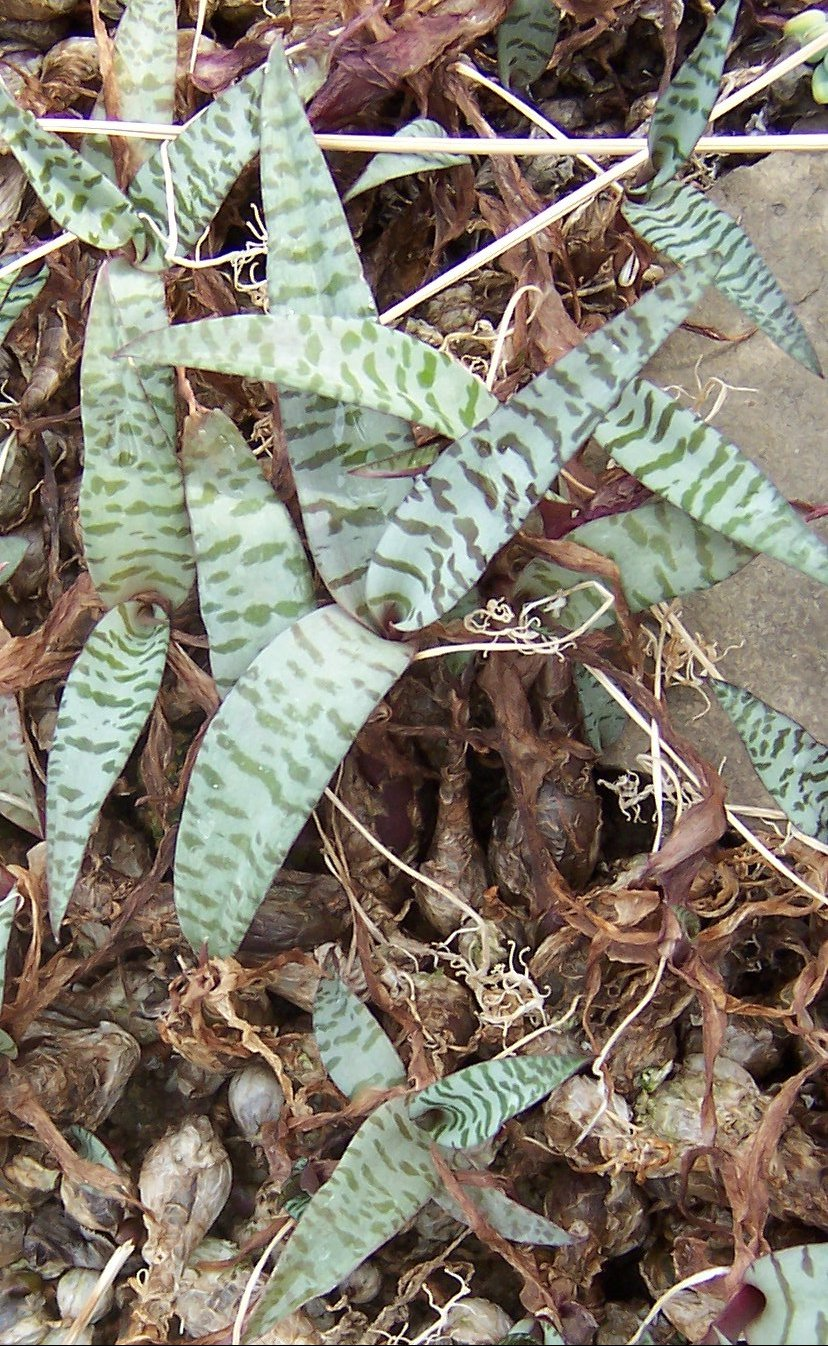
- Silver squill, Ledebouria socialis

Scientific classification
- Kingdom: Plantae
- Clade: Tracheophytes
- Clade: Angiosperms
- Clade: Monocots
- Order: Asparagales
- Family: Asparagaceae
- Subfamily: Scilloideae
- Subtribe: Massoniinae
- Genus: Ledebouria; Roth

Synonyms
- Eratobotrys Fenzl ex Endl.; Xeodolon Salisb.

= Ledebouria =

Genus of flowering plants

Ledebouria is a genus of African bulbous perennial herbs in the Asparagus family, Asparagaceae, subfamily Scilloideae. Most members were previously part of the genus Scilla. A number of species are grown by cacti and succulent enthusiasts for their patterned leaves.

Most of the species are native to Madagascar and Africa (except North Africa), but a few are from India, Sri Lanka or the Arabian Peninsula.

The genus name of Ledebouria is in honour of Carl Friedrich von Ledebour (1786–1851), a German-Estonian botanist. It was first described and published in Nov. Pl. Sp. on page 194 in 1821.

== Species ==
As of September 2026, Plants of the World Online accepted these species:

- Ledebouria altopaludosa Hankey
- Ledebouria apertiflora (Baker) Jessop
- Ledebouria asperifolia (van der Merwe) S.Venter
- Ledebouria atrobrunnea S.Venter
- Ledebouria bladeniana D.M.Cumming
- Ledebouria caesiomontana Hankey & N.Hahn
- Ledebouria camdebooensis Hickson & D.H.Schnabel
- Ledebouria camerooniana (Baker) Speta
- Ledebouria ciliata (Baker) Stedje
- Ledebouria confusa S.Venter
- Ledebouria cooperi (Hook.f.) Jessop
- Ledebouria cordifolia (Baker) Stedje & Thulin
- Ledebouria coriacea S.Venter
- Ledebouria corrugata D.M.Cumming
- Ledebouria cremnophila S.Venter & van Jaarsv.
- Ledebouria crispa S.Venter
- Ledebouria dolomiticola S.Venter
- Ledebouria edulis (Engl.) Stedje
- Ledebouria ensifolia (Eckl.) S.Venter & T.J.Edwards
- Ledebouria fishrivierensis D.M.Cumming
- Ledebouria floribunda (Baker) Jessop
- Ledebouria galpinii (Baker) S.Venter & T.J.Edwards
- Ledebouria glauca S.Venter
- Ledebouria grandifolia (Balf.f.) A.G.Mill. & D.Alexander
- Ledebouria hardyi J.C.Manning
- Ledebouria hyacinthina Roth
- Ledebouria hypoxidioides (Schönland) Jessop
- Ledebouria inquinata (C.A.Sm.) Jessop
- Ledebouria insularis A.G.Mill.
- Ledebouria kirkii (Baker) Stedje & Thulin
- Ledebouria lepida (N.E.Br.) S.Venter
- Ledebouria leptophylla (Baker) S.Venter
- Ledebouria lilacina (Fenzl ex Endl.) Speta
- Ledebouria loedolffiae van Jaarsv. & S.Venter
- Ledebouria luteola Jessop
- Ledebouria macowanii (Baker) S.Venter
- Ledebouria maesta (Baker) Speta
- Ledebouria marginata (Baker) Jessop
- Ledebouria mavelii V.Suresh, Sojan & Ambika
- Ledebouria minima (Baker) S.Venter
- Ledebouria mokobulanensis Hankey & T.J.Edwards
- Ledebouria monophylla S.Venter
- Ledebouria nitida (Eckl.) J.C.Manning & Goldblatt
- Ledebouria noritica Hankey & Ant.Castro
- Ledebouria nossibeensis (H.Perrier) J.C.Manning & Goldblatt
- Ledebouria obstii (W.Heering) Mart.-Azorín, M.B.Crespo & M.Á.Alonso
- Ledebouria ovalifolia (Schrad.) Jessop
- Ledebouria ovatifolia (Baker) Jessop
- Ledebouria papillata S.Venter
- Ledebouria pardalota S.Venter
- Ledebouria parvifolia S.Venter
- Ledebouria purpurea Hankey
- Ledebouria remifolia S.Venter
- Ledebouria revoluta (L.f.) Jessop
- Ledebouria rietrivierensis D.M.Cumming
- Ledebouria rupestris (van der Merwe) S.Venter
- Ledebouria sandersonii (Baker) S.Venter & T.J.Edwards
- Ledebouria scabrida Jessop
- Ledebouria socialis (Baker) Jessop
- Ledebouria somaliensis (Baker) Stedje & Thulin
- Ledebouria steenkampsbergensis Hankey
- Ledebouria sudanica (A.Chev.) Burg
- Ledebouria undulata (Jacq. ex Willd.) Jessop
- Ledebouria urceolata Stedje
- Ledebouria venteri van Jaarsv. & A.E.van Wyk
- Ledebouria viridis S.R.Dutta & P.Harvey ex M.R.Almeida
- Ledebouria viscosa Jessop
- Ledebouria waterbergensis Hankey
- Ledebouria weberi van Jaarsv. & S.Venter
- Ledebouria zebrina (Baker) S.Venter

=== Formerly placed here ===
Formerly placed in Ledebouria:

- Drimiopsis atropurpurea N.E.Br. (as Ledebouria atropurpurea (N.E.Br.) J.C.Manning & Goldblatt)
- Drimiopsis barteri Baker (as Ledebouria barteri (Baker) J.C.Manning & Goldblatt)
- Drimiopsis botryoides Baker (as Ledebouria botryoides (Baker) J.C.Manning & Goldblatt)
- Drimiopsis burkei Baker (as Ledebouria burkei (Baker) J.C.Manning & Goldblatt)
- Drimiopsis comptonii U.Müll.-Doblies & D.Müll.-Doblies (as Ledebouria comptonii (U.Müll.-Doblies & D.Müll.-Doblies) J.C.Manning & Goldblatt)
- Drimia cryptopoda (Baker) Pfosser, Wetschnig & Speta (as Ledebouria cryptopoda (Baker) J.C.Manning & Goldblatt)
- Drimiopsis davidsoniae U.Müll.-Doblies & D.Müll.-Doblies (as Ledebouria davidsoniae (U.Müll.-Doblies & D.Müll.-Doblies) J.C.Manning & Goldblatt)
- Drimiopsis fischeri (Engl.) Stedje (as Ledebouria fischeri (Engl.) J.C.Manning & Goldblatt)
- Resnova humifusa (Baker) U.Müll.-Doblies & D.Müll.-Doblies (as Ledebouria humifusa (Baker) J.C.Manning & Goldblatt)
- Drimiopsis kikiae Lebatha ex J.M.H.Shaw (as Ledebouria kikiae J.M.H.Shaw)
- Resnova lachenalioides (Baker) van der Merwe (as Ledebouria lachenalioides (Baker) J.C.Manning & Goldblatt)
- Drimiopsis linioseta Hankey & Lebatha (as Ledebouria linioseta (Hankey & Lebatha) J.C.Manning & Goldblatt)
- Drimiopsis loskopica (Hankey) Hankey (as Ledebouria loskopica Hankey)
- Drimia indica (Roxb.) Jessop (as Ledebouria maculata Dalzell)
- Resnova maxima van der Merwe (as Ledebouria maxima (van der Merwe) J.C.Manning & Goldblatt)
- Resnova megaphylla Hankey ex J.M.H.Shaw (as Ledebouria megaphylla (Hankey ex J.M.H.Shaw) van Jaarsv. & Eggli)
- Resnova minor van der Merwe (as Ledebouria minor (van der Merwe) J.C.Manning & Goldblatt)
- Drimiopsis maculata Lindl. & Paxton (as Ledebouria petiolata J.C.Manning & Goldblatt)
- Resnova pilosa van der Merwe (as Ledebouria pilosa (van der Merwe) J.C.Manning & Goldblatt)
- Drimiopsis pusilla U.Müll.-Doblies & D.Müll.-Doblies (as Ledebouria pusilla (U.Müll.-Doblies & D.Müll.-Doblies) J.C.Manning & Goldblatt)
- Drimiopsis reilleyana U.Müll.-Doblies & D.Müll.-Doblies (as Ledebouria reilleyana (U.Müll.-Doblies & D.Müll.-Doblies) J.C.Manning & Goldblatt)
- Resnova humifusa (Baker) U.Müll.-Doblies & D.Müll.-Doblies (as Ledebouria transvaalensis (van der Merwe) J.C.Manning & Goldblatt)
- Drimiopsis woodii Baker (as Ledebouria woodii (Baker) J.C.Manning & Goldblatt)
