= Massonia etesionamibensis =

Conservation status
- Least Concern (IUCN 3.1)

Scientific classification
- Kingdom: Plantae
- Clade: Tracheophytes
- Clade: Angiosperms
- Clade: Monocots
- Order: Asparagales
- Family: Asparagaceae
- Subfamily: Scilloideae
- Genus: Massonia
- Species: M. etesionamibensis

Binomial name
- Massonia etesionamibensis (U.Müll.-Doblies & D.Müll.-Doblies) J.C.Manning & Goldblatt

Species of flowering plant

Massonia etesionamibensis (syn. Whiteheadia etesionamibensis) is a species of plant that is endemic to Namibia. Its natural habitat is rocky areas. The genus is named for Scottish botanist and gardener Francis Masson.
