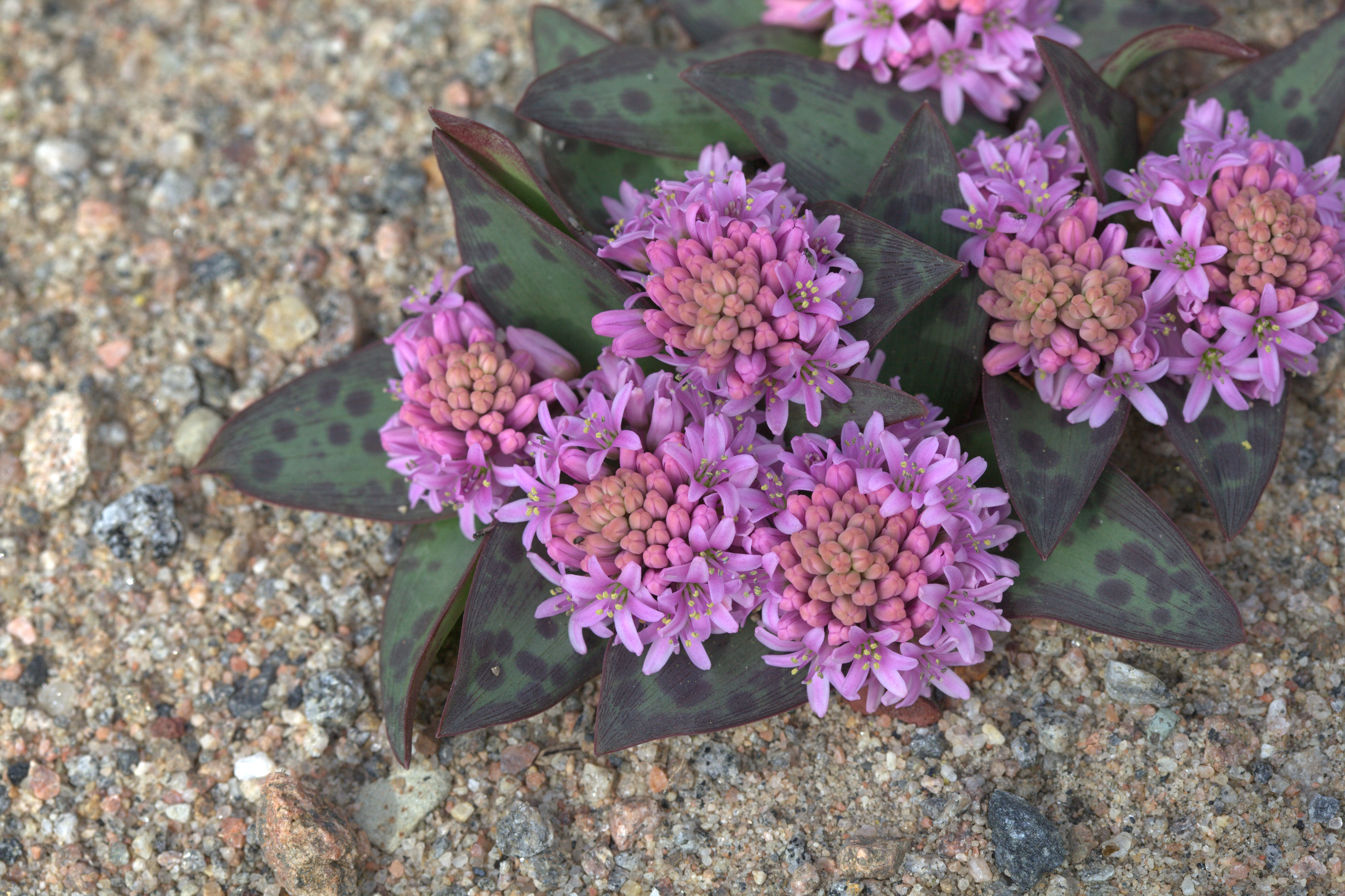
- In bloom
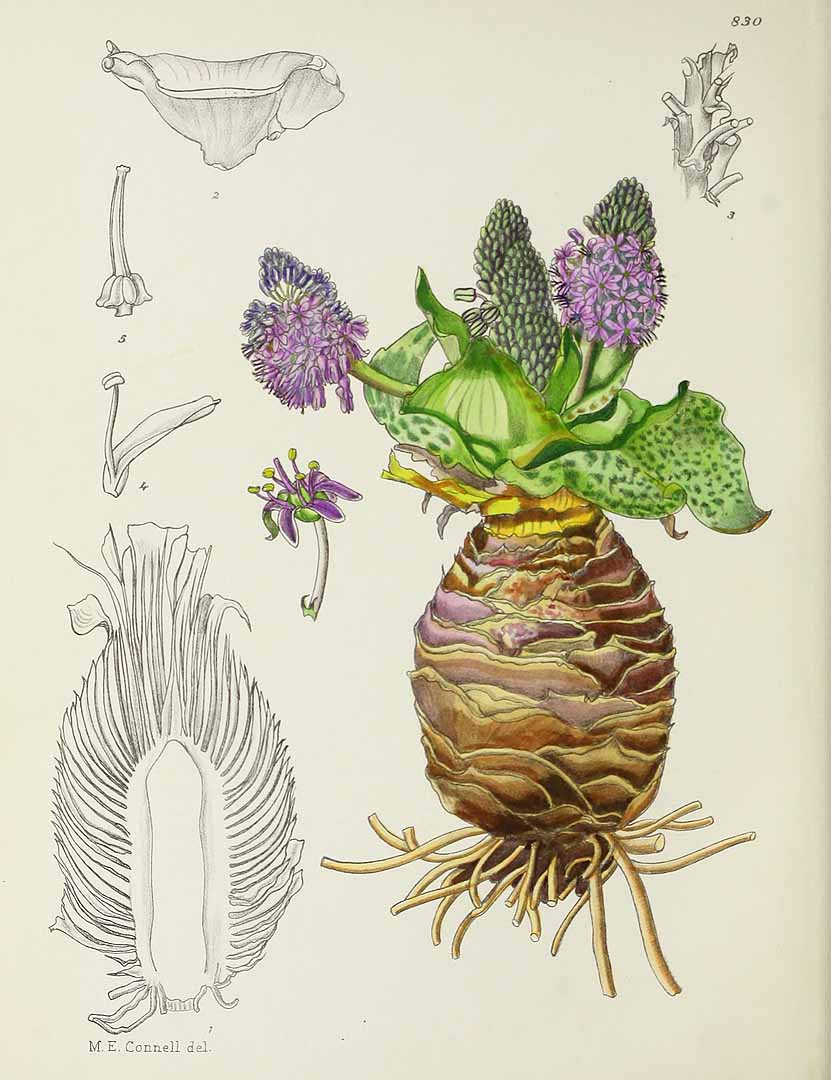
- Botanical illustration

Scientific classification
- Kingdom: Plantae
- Clade: Embryophytes
- Clade: Tracheophytes
- Clade: Angiosperms
- Clade: Monocots
- Order: Asparagales
- Family: Asparagaceae
- Subfamily: Scilloideae
- Genus: Ledebouria
- Species: L. ovatifolia

Binomial name
- Ledebouria ovatifolia (Baker) Jessop

Synonyms
- Scilla albomarginata van der Merwe; Scilla climacocarpha C.A.Sm.; Scilla ovatifolia Baker

= Ledebouria ovatifolia =

Species of flowering plant

Ledebouria ovatifolia, the flat-leaved African hyacinth (not to be confused with Ledebouria ovalifolia), is a widespread species of bulbous flowering plant in the family Asparagaceae, native to South Africa and Lesotho. With its highly variable spotted leaves and attractive flowers, it is popular with succulent enthusiasts, although it is not, strictly speaking, a succulent.

== Subtaxa ==
The following subspecies are accepted:

- Ledebouria ovatifolia subsp. ovatifolia
- Ledebouria ovatifolia subsp. scabrida N.R.Crouch & T.J.Edwards – KwaZulu-Natal
