= L. imbricata =

L. imbricata may refer to:

- Litsea imbricata, a plant species endemic to New Caledonia
- Lockhartia imbricata, an orchid species found from Trinidad to tropical South America

== See also ==
- Imbricata
