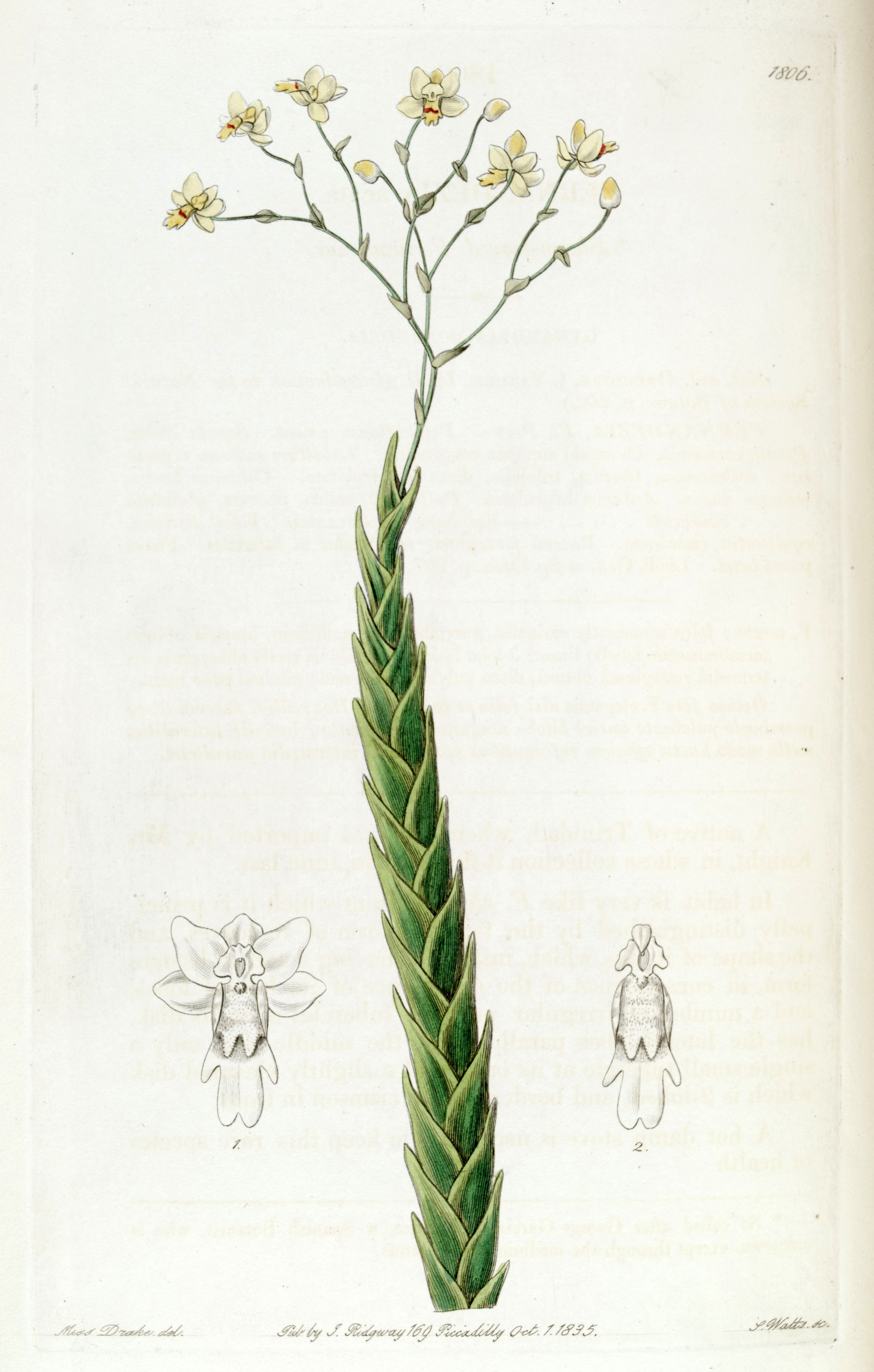
- 1836 illustration

Scientific classification
- Kingdom: Plantae
- Clade: Tracheophytes
- Clade: Angiosperms
- Clade: Monocots
- Order: Asparagales
- Family: Orchidaceae
- Subfamily: Epidendroideae
- Genus: Lockhartia
- Species: L. acuta

Binomial name
- Lockhartia acuta (Lindl.) Rchb.f.

Synonyms
- Fernandezia acuta Lindl. (basionym); Lockhartia pallida Rchb.f.; Lockhartia lasseri Schnee

= Lockhartia acuta =

Species of orchid

Lockhartia acuta is a species of orchid native to Costa Rica, Panama, Venezuela, Colombia and Trinidad.
