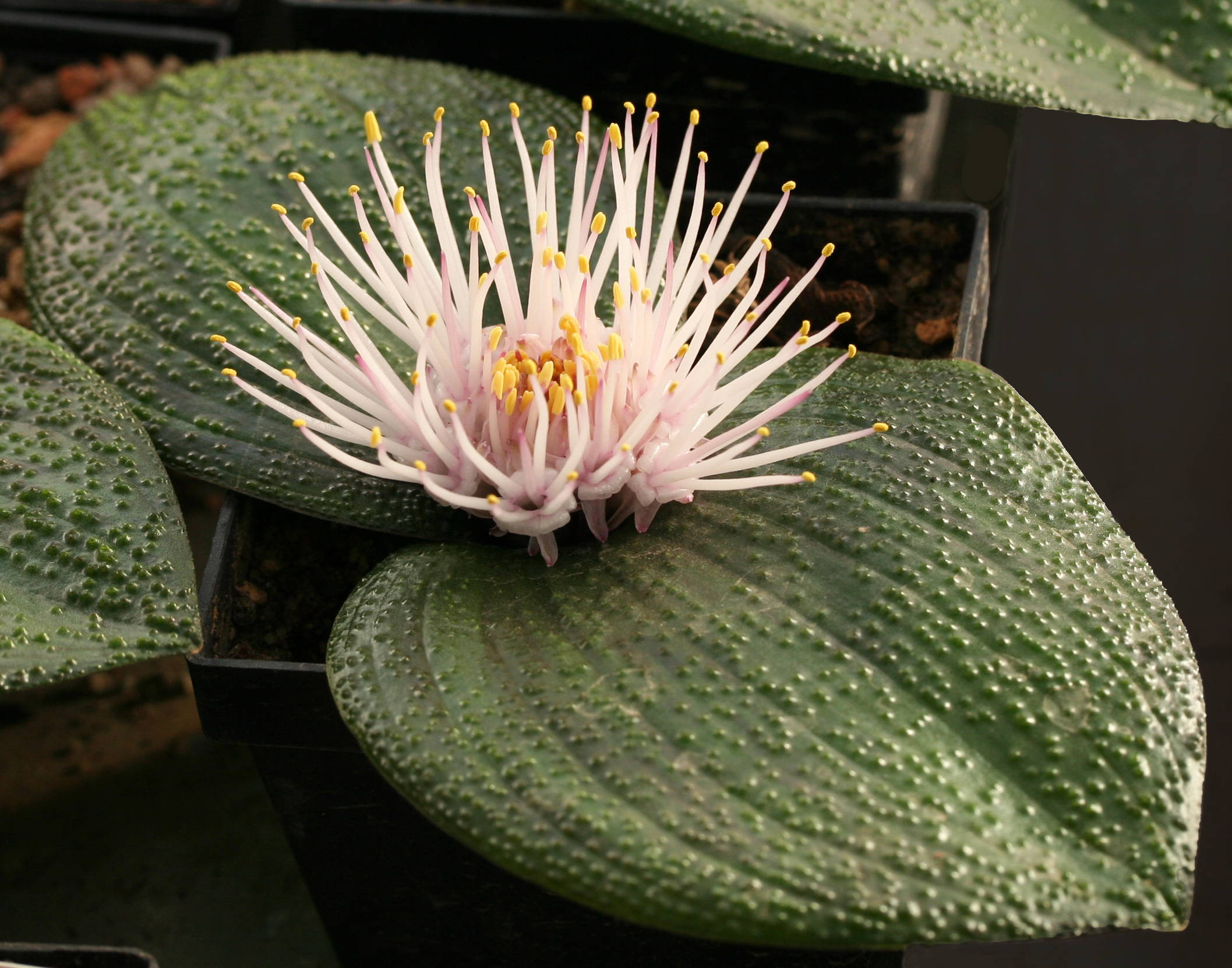

Scientific classification
- Kingdom: Plantae
- Clade: Tracheophytes
- Clade: Angiosperms
- Clade: Monocots
- Order: Asparagales
- Family: Asparagaceae
- Subfamily: Scilloideae
- Genus: Massonia
- Species: M. pustulata

Binomial name
- Massonia pustulata Jacq.

Synonyms
- Massonia scabra; Massonia schlechtendalii

= Massonia pustulata =

Species of flowering plant

Massonia pustulata, the blistered massonia, is a species of flowering plant in the family Asparagaceae, subfamily Scilloideae, native to the Western Cape of South Africa. Growing to 10 cm (3.9 in) tall and broad, it is a small bulbous perennial with two horizontal, opposite leaves, and virtually stalkless cream or pink flowers in winter. The stamens are longer than the perianth, giving the flower the appearance of a rounded, spiky brush-head. The deep "pock marks" on the leaves give the plant its common name, as well as the specific epithet pustulata.

In temperate zones it requires protection as it does not survive being frozen. Its small size makes it a suitable subject for a pot under glass. It has been given the Royal Horticultural Society's Award of Garden Merit.

The Massonia genus of plants is named for Scottish botanist and gardener Francis Masson, who was Kew Gardens' first plant hunter.
