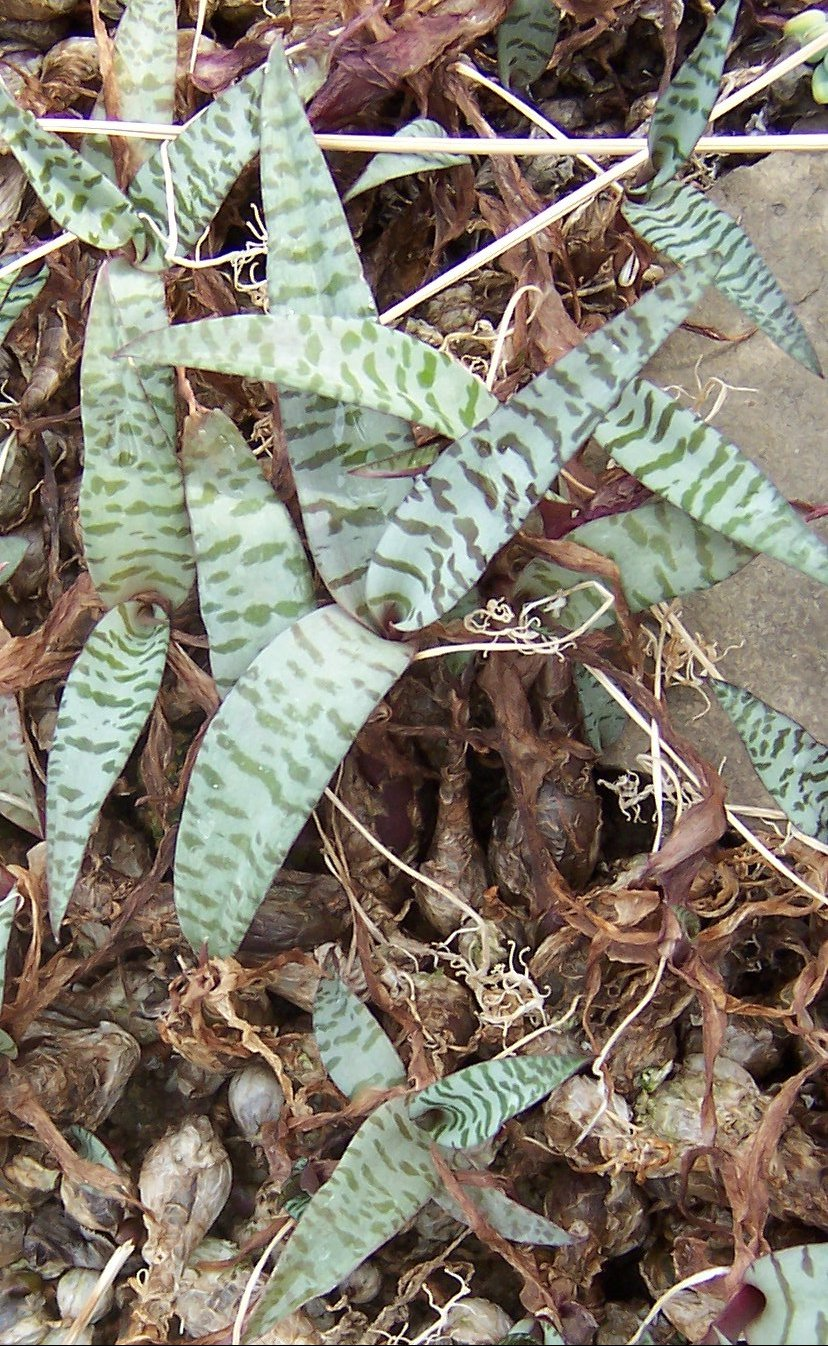

Scientific classification
- Kingdom: Plantae
- Clade: Tracheophytes
- Clade: Angiosperms
- Clade: Monocots
- Order: Asparagales
- Family: Asparagaceae
- Subfamily: Scilloideae
- Genus: Ledebouria
- Species: L. socialis

Binomial name
- Ledebouria socialis (Baker) Jessop

Synonyms
- Scilla socialis Baker; Scilla violacea Hutch.

= Ledebouria socialis =

Species of plant

Ledebouria socialis, the silver squill, wood hyacinth, or leopard lily, is a geophytic species of bulbous perennial plant native to the Eastern Cape Province of South Africa. It was first described by John Gilbert Baker as Scilla socialis in 1870. John Peter Jessop later revised the genus Scilla and split off several species, reclassifying Scilla socialis into the genus Ledebouria in 1970. It is often cultivated and grows well with minimal care.

== Etymology ==
Ledebouria is named for Carl Friedrich von Ledebour (1785–1851), a botanist who published, among other things, the first complete Russian flora.

Socialis means 'growing in pure stands', 'dominant', or 'growing in colonies'.
