= Lockhartia longifolia =

Scientific classification
- Kingdom: Plantae
- Clade: Tracheophytes
- Clade: Angiosperms
- Clade: Monocots
- Order: Asparagales
- Family: Orchidaceae
- Subfamily: Epidendroideae
- Genus: Lockhartia
- Species: L. longifolia

Binomial name
- Lockhartia longifolia (Lindl.) Schltr.

Synonyms
- Fernandezia longifolia Lindl.

Species of orchid

Lockhartia longifolia is a species of orchid native to western South America and Venezuela.
