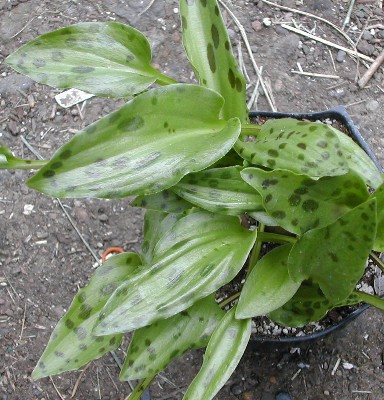
- Drimiopsis maculata

Scientific classification
- Kingdom: Plantae
- Clade: Tracheophytes
- Clade: Angiosperms
- Clade: Monocots
- Order: Asparagales
- Family: Asparagaceae
- Subfamily: Scilloideae
- Genus: Drimiopsis; Lindl. & Paxton

= Drimiopsis =

Genus of flowering plants

Drimiopsis is a genus of African bulbous perennial herbs in the family Asparagaceae, subfamily Scilloideae, native to sub-Saharan Africa. Sometimes species are placed under the genus Ledebouria.

== Species ==
- Drimiopsis atropurpurea N.E.Br - Gauteng, KwaZulu-Natal
- Drimiopsis barteri Baker - from Ghana to Somalia, south to Zambia
- Drimiopsis botryoides Baker - eastern Africa
- Drimiopsis burkei Baker - Gauteng, KwaZulu-Natal, Zimbabwe
- Drimiopsis comptonii U.Müll.-Doblies & D.Müll.-Doblies - Eswatini
- Drimiopsis davidsoniae U.Müll.-Doblies & D.Müll.-Doblies - Mpumalanga
- Drimiopsis fischeri (Engl.) Stedje - Tanzania
- Drimiopsis linioseta Hankey & Lebatha - Mpumalanga
- Drimiopsis maculata (type)
- Drimiopsis pusilla U.Müll.-Doblies & D.Müll.-Doblies - Eswatini
- Drimiopsis reilleyana U.Müll.-Doblies & D.Müll.-Doblies - Eswatini
- Drimiopsis rosea A.Chev. - Central African Republic
- Drimiopsis seretii De Wild - Zaïre
- Drimiopsis spicata (Baker) Sebsebe & Stedje in I.Friis & H.Balslev - Sudan, Ethiopia
