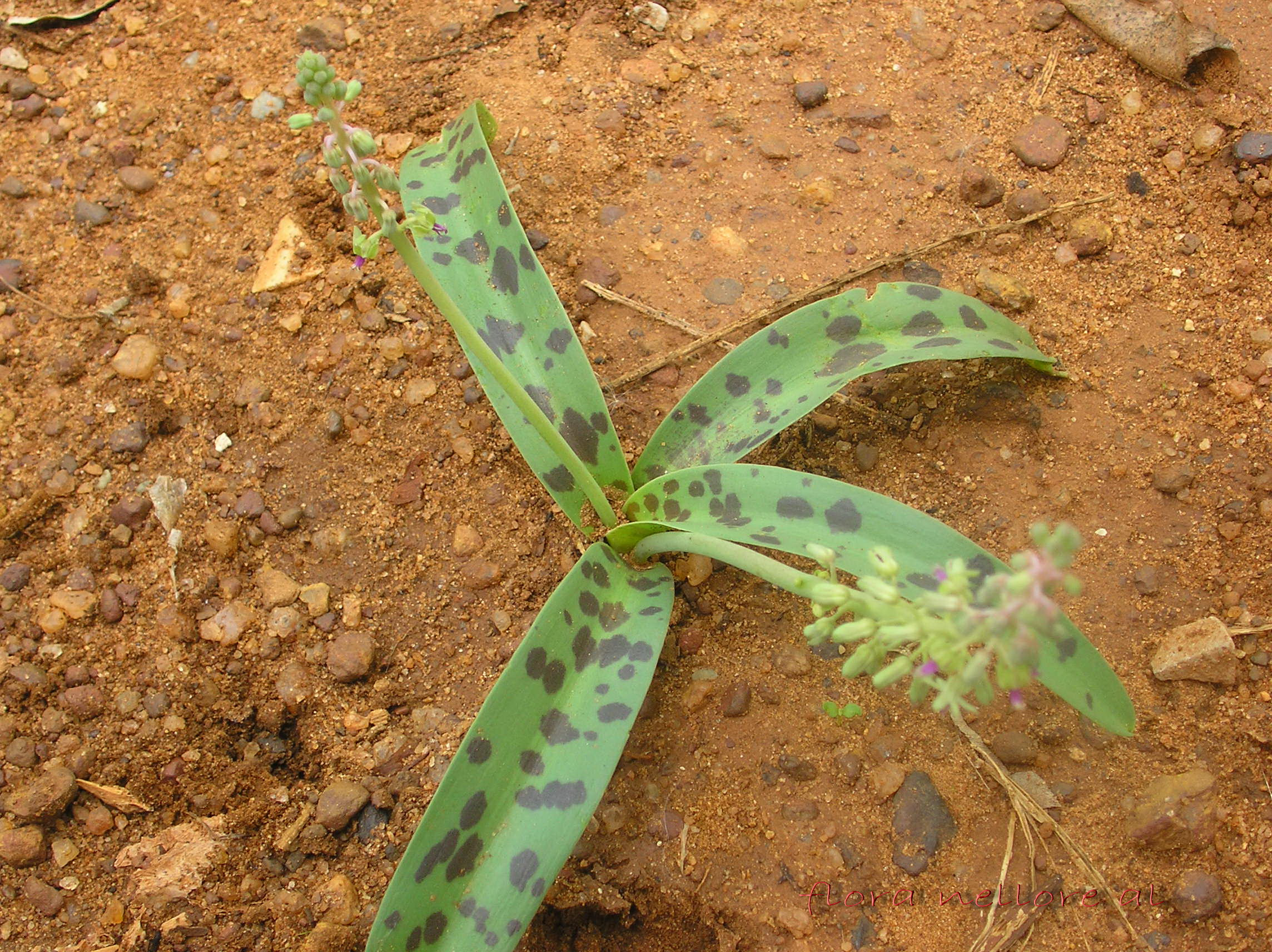

Scientific classification
- Kingdom: Plantae
- Clade: Embryophytes
- Clade: Tracheophytes
- Clade: Spermatophytes
- Clade: Angiosperms
- Clade: Monocots
- Order: Asparagales
- Family: Asparagaceae
- Subfamily: Scilloideae
- Genus: Ledebouria
- Species: L. revoluta

Binomial name
- Ledebouria revoluta (L.f.) Jessop 1970

Synonyms
- Hyacinthus revolutus L. f.; Ledebouria hyacinthina; Scilla hyacinthina (Roth) J.F.Macbr

= Ledebouria revoluta =

Species of flowering plant

Ledebouria revoluta, the south Indian squill, is a flowering plant species in the genus Ledebouria found in Southern Africa and India.

== Description ==
The leaves of Ledebouria revoluta are smooth and fleshy, and unlike those of some other Ledebouria species they are present when the flowers emerge. The leaves' venation is obscure and their margins are usually a similar colour to the rest of the leaf. The flowers are born densely, often on multiple, drooping inflorescences. The flowers are purple-to-pink, with pink pedicels and pale yellow anthers. The ovary has six lobes and the seeds are a brown color. Unlike some other Ledebouria species, both the leaves and bulb scales of L. revoluta have threads when torn.

== Chemistry ==
In Africa some tribes consume the bulbs of L. revoluta. It is widely used as an ethnomedicinal in Southern Africa. Homoisoflavanones can be isolated from the bulbs of L. revoluta. In India, this species is commonly known as ‘Indian squill’ or ‘jangali pnyaaj’ (wild onion), and fresh squill yields several cardiac glycosides (scillarin A, scillarin-B), 3-benzyl-4-chromanones, and scillarenin bis-L-rhamnoside. The scaly bulb of L. revoluta had potential antibacterial (against both Gram-positive and Gram-negative bacteria) and antifungal activity.

== Tissue culture ==
Micropropagation of Ledebouria revoluta through callus culture and indirect somatic embryogenesis as well as shoot organogenesis was well established. Artificial seeds technology was successfully performed by alginate-encapsulation of this somatic embryos.

== Cytology ==
Detail cytological studies of sporophytic and gametophytic generation of Ledebouria revoluta was made by Haque and Ghosh (2016). Meiotic studies revealed 15 bivalents in L. revoluta, which confirms their diploid numbers 2n = 30. Diploid karyotype as well as haploid karyotype was studied from somatic cells and pollen grains respectively.

== Etymology ==
Ledebouria is named for Carl Friedrich von Ledebour (1785-1851), a botanist who published, among other things, the first complete Russian flora.
