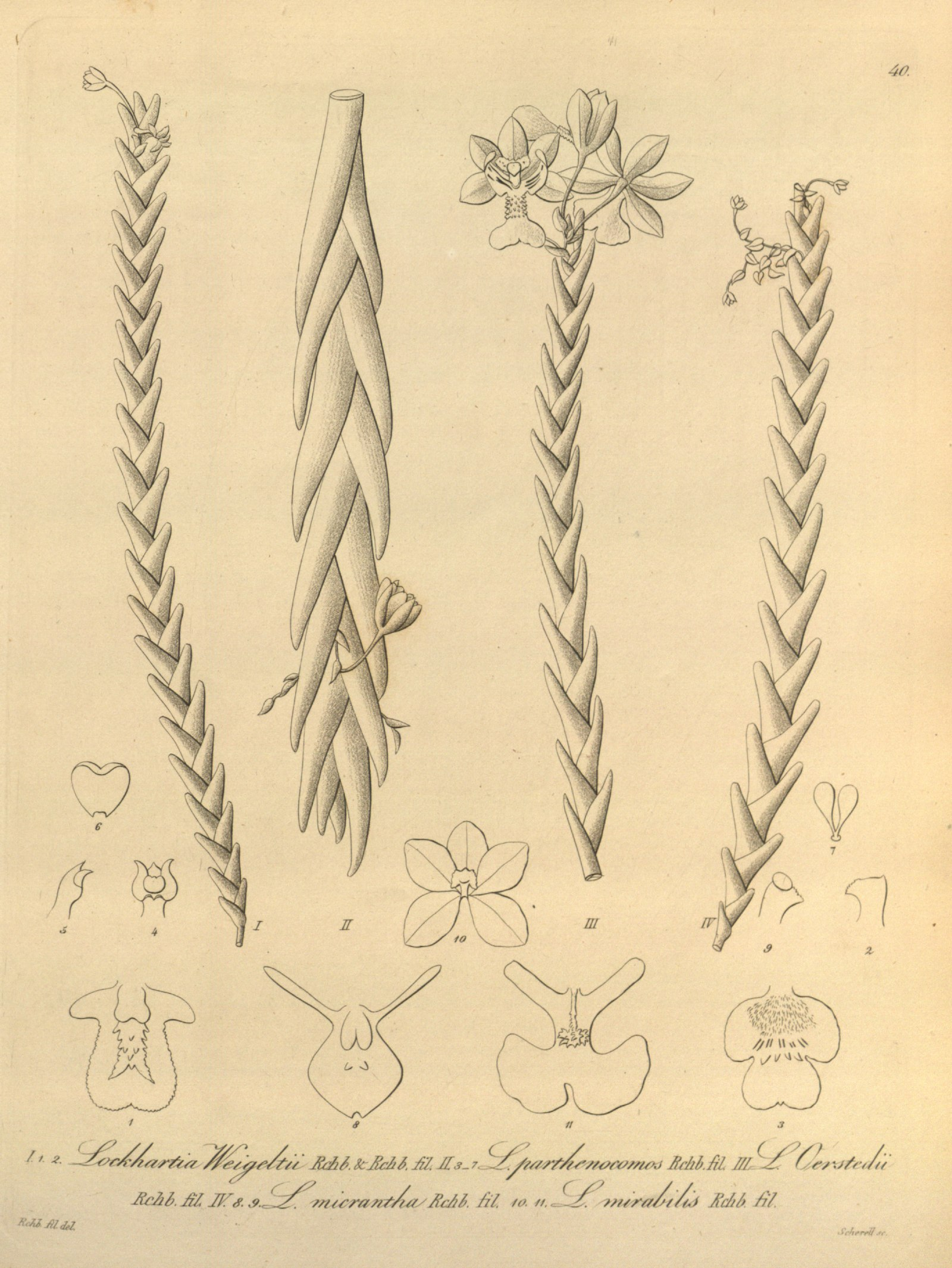
- 1858 illustration

Scientific classification
- Kingdom: Plantae
- Clade: Tracheophytes
- Clade: Angiosperms
- Clade: Monocots
- Order: Asparagales
- Family: Orchidaceae
- Subfamily: Epidendroideae
- Genus: Lockhartia
- Species: L. micrantha

Binomial name
- Lockhartia micrantha Rchb.f.

Synonyms
- Lockhartia chiriquiensis Schltr.; Lockhartia lankesteri Ames; Lockhartia pandurata Pupulin

= Lockhartia micrantha =

Species of orchid

Lockhartia micrantha is a species of orchid native to Nicaragua, Costa Rica, Panama and Colombia.
