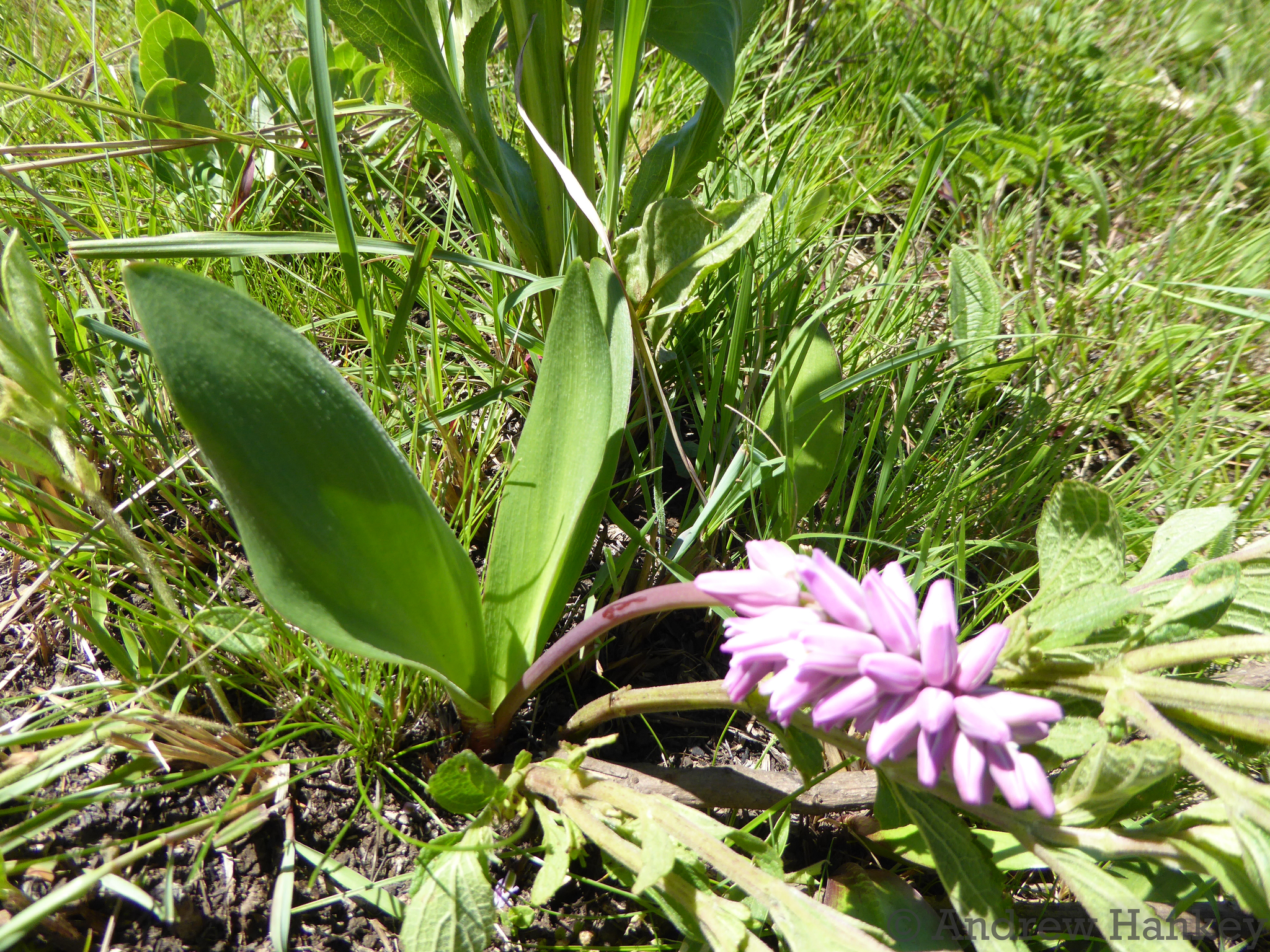
- Resnova lachenalioides

Scientific classification
- Kingdom: Plantae
- Clade: Tracheophytes
- Clade: Angiosperms
- Clade: Monocots
- Order: Asparagales
- Family: Asparagaceae
- Subfamily: Scilloideae
- Subtribe: Massoniinae
- Genus: Resnova van der Merwe

= Resnova =

Genus of flowering plants

Resnova is a genus of bulbous perennials in the family Asparagaceae, subfamily Scilloideae, tribe Hyacintheae, subtribe Massoniinae. Resnova species are native to South Africa (the Cape Provinces, KwaZulu-Natal, and the Northern Provinces).

== Species ==
As of November 2023, Plants of the World Online accepted the following species:

- Resnova humifusa (Baker) U.Müll.-Doblies & D.Müll.-Doblies
- Resnova lachenalioides (Baker) van der Merwe
- Resnova maxima van der Merwe
- Resnova megaphylla Hankey ex J.M.H.Shaw
- Resnova minor van der Merwe
- Resnova pilosa van der Merwe
