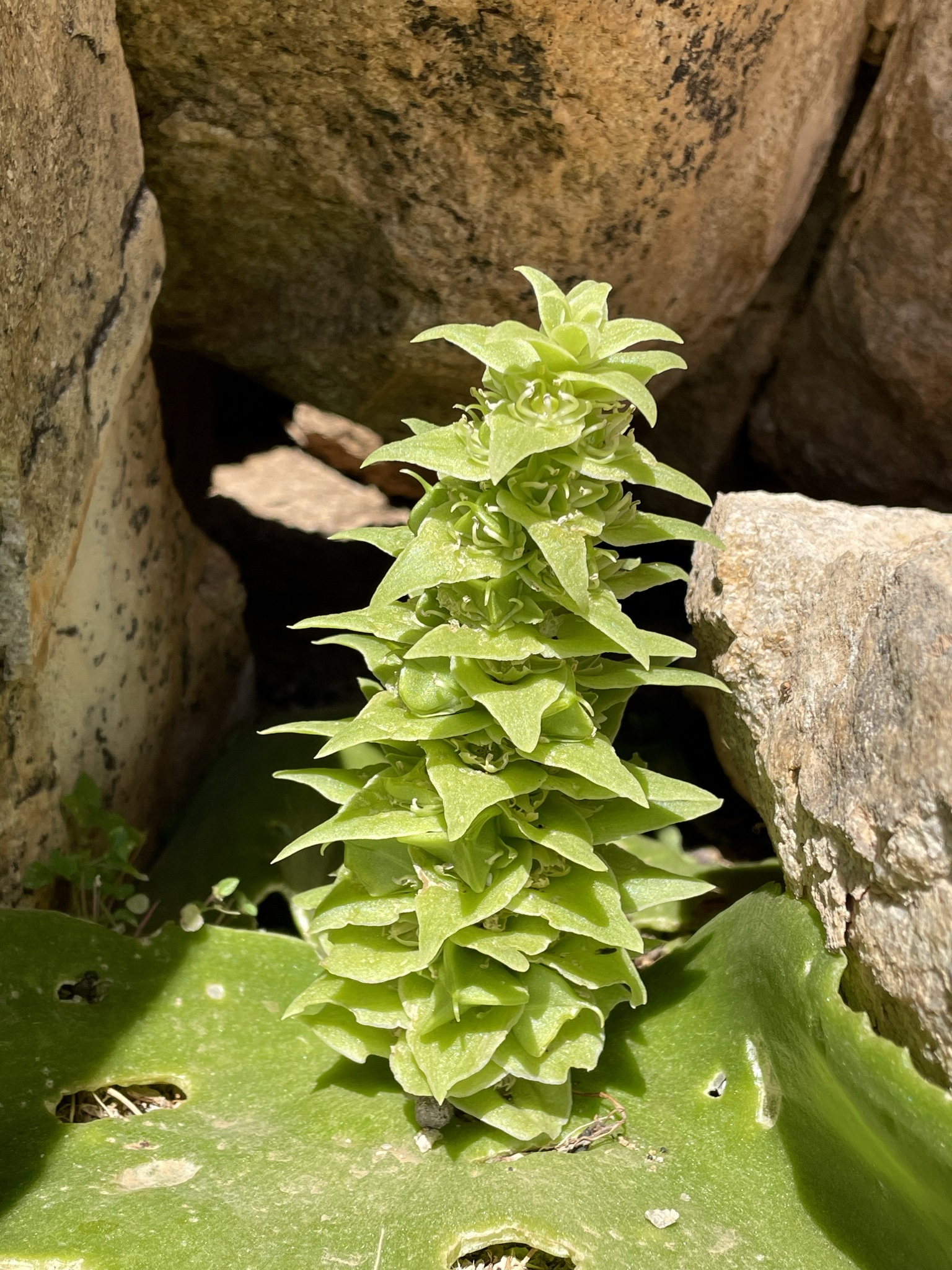

Conservation status
- Least Concern (SANBI Red List)

Scientific classification
- Kingdom: Plantae
- Clade: Embryophytes
- Clade: Tracheophytes
- Clade: Angiosperms
- Clade: Monocots
- Order: Asparagales
- Family: Asparagaceae
- Subfamily: Scilloideae
- Genus: Massonia
- Species: M. bifolia

Binomial name
- Massonia bifolia (Jacq.) J.C.Manning & Goldblatt

Synonyms
- Basilaea bifolia (Jacq.) Mirb.; Eucomis bifolia Jacq.; Whiteheadia bifolia (Jacq.) Baker; Whiteheadia latifolia Harv.; Melanthium massoniifolium Andrews

= Massonia bifolia =

Species of plant endemic to Namibia

Massonia bifolia is a species of geophyte in the genus Massonia. It is native to southern Namibia and to the western Cape Provinces of South Africa.

== Distribution ==
Massonia bifolia is found from southern Namibia down to the Western Cape.

== Habitat ==
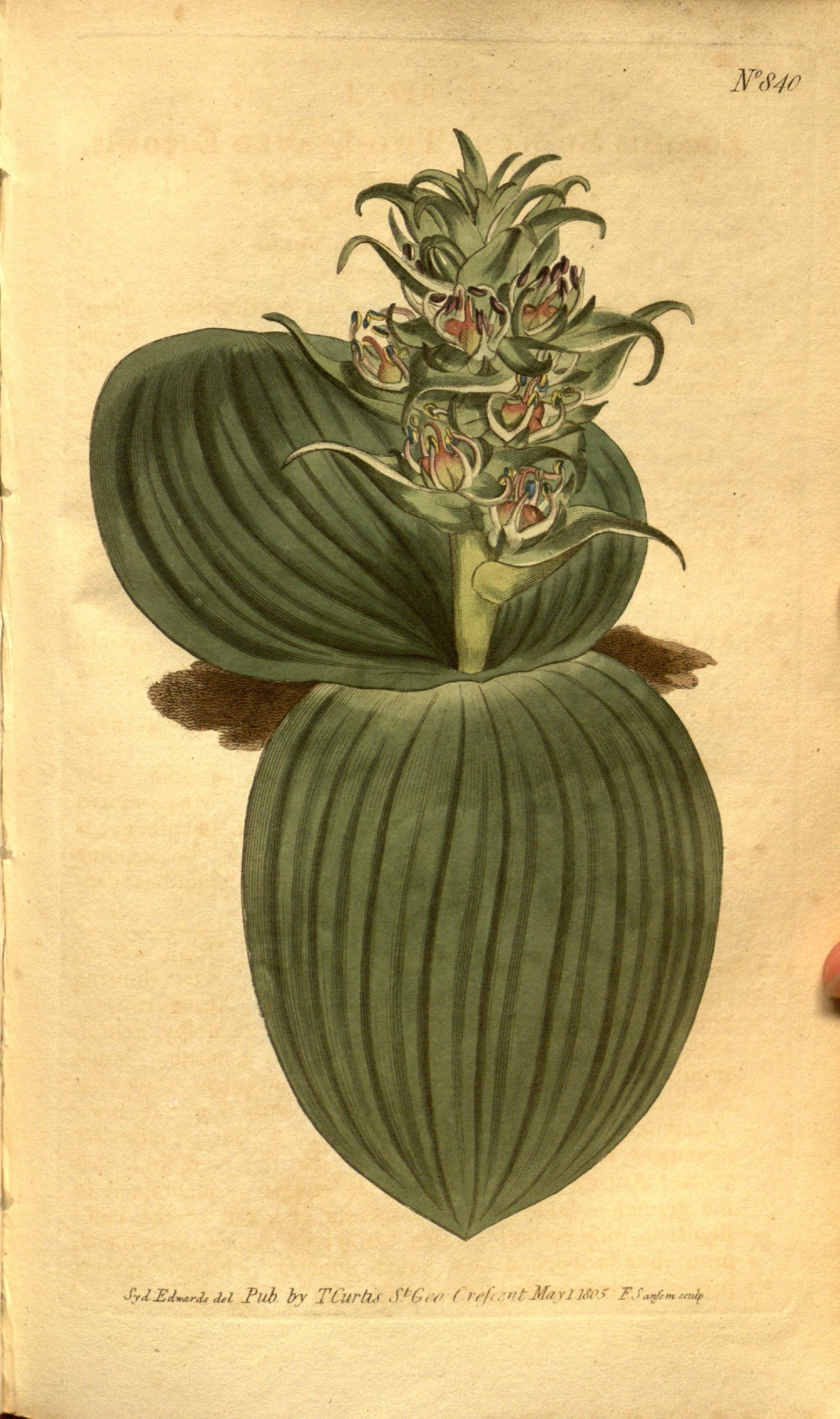
Illustration from 1805

Massonia bifolia is found mostly in rock outcrops, in pockets of sheltered rocky sites that are locally moist during the winter growing season, and which offer shade and protection from the sun throughout the year.

== Conservation status ==
Massonia bifolia is classified as Least Concern.
