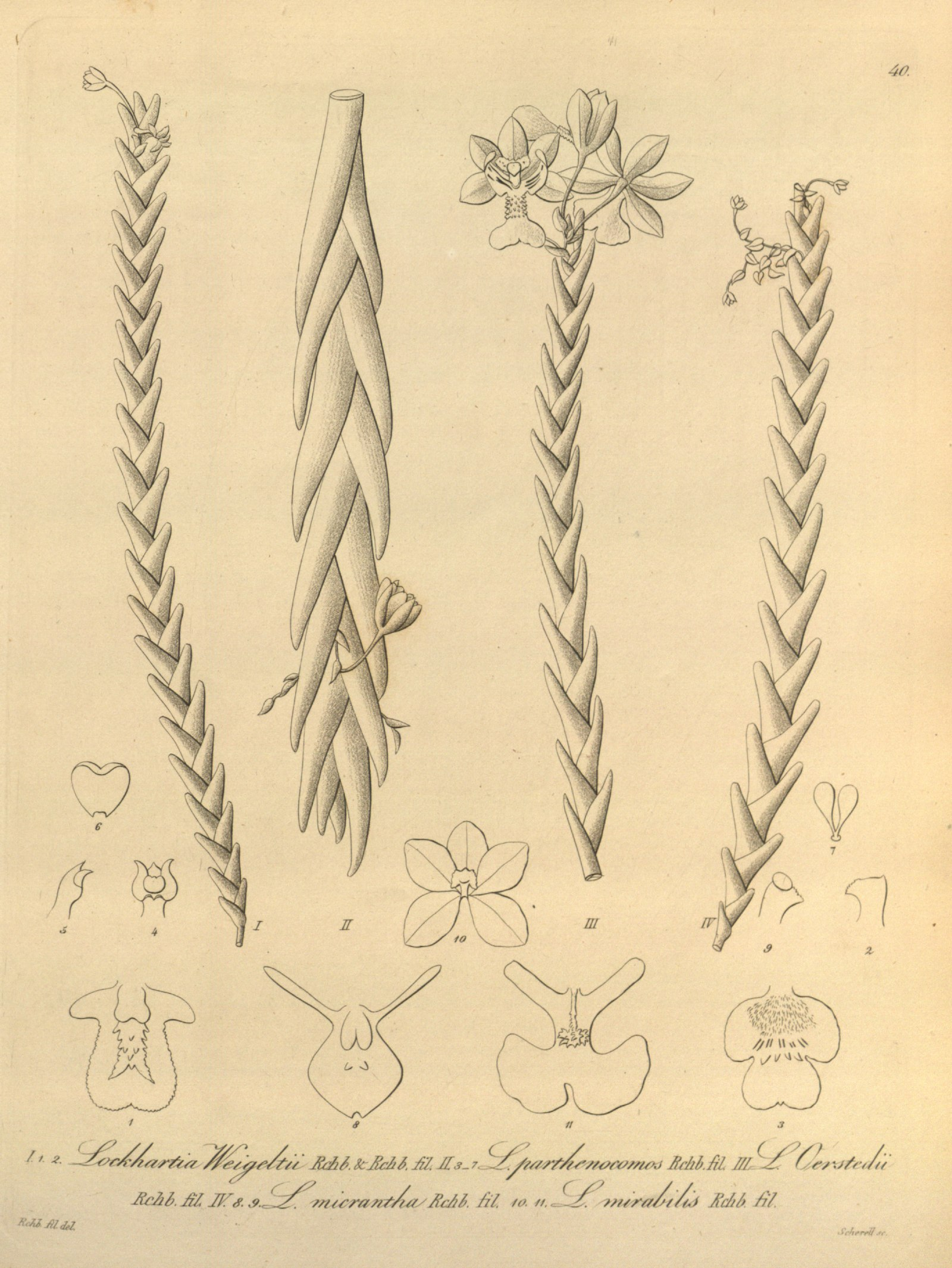
- Drawing of Lockhartia imbricata

Scientific classification
- Kingdom: Plantae
- Clade: Tracheophytes
- Clade: Angiosperms
- Clade: Monocots
- Order: Asparagales
- Family: Orchidaceae
- Subfamily: Epidendroideae
- Genus: Lockhartia
- Species: L. dipleura

Binomial name
- Lockhartia dipleura Schltr.

= Lockhartia dipleura =

Species of orchid

Lockhartia dipleura is a species of orchid native to Costa Rica.
