= Ledebouria insularis =

Conservation status
- Endangered (IUCN 3.1)

Scientific classification
- Kingdom: Plantae
- Clade: Tracheophytes
- Clade: Angiosperms
- Clade: Monocots
- Order: Asparagales
- Family: Asparagaceae
- Subfamily: Scilloideae
- Genus: Ledebouria
- Species: L. insularis

Binomial name
- Ledebouria insularis A.G.Mill.

Species of flowering plant

Ledebouria insularis is a species of plant that is endemic to Samhah, one of the islands of Socotra, part of Yemen.

== Etymology ==
Ledebouria is named for Carl Friedrich von Ledebour (1785-1851), a botanist who published, among other things, the first complete Russian flora.
