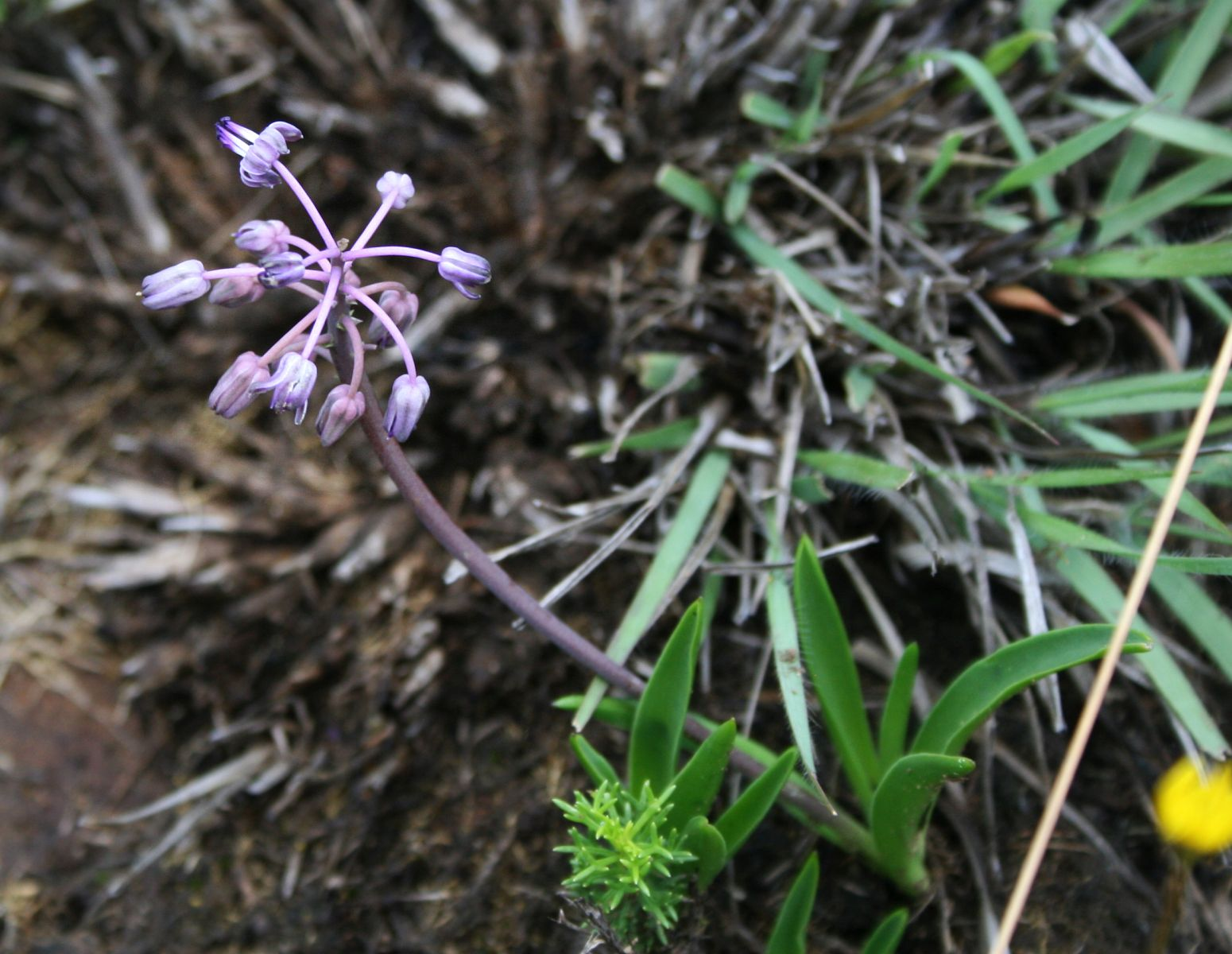

Scientific classification
- Kingdom: Plantae
- Clade: Embryophytes
- Clade: Tracheophytes
- Clade: Angiosperms
- Clade: Monocots
- Order: Asparagales
- Family: Asparagaceae
- Subfamily: Scilloideae
- Genus: Ledebouria
- Species: L. minima

Binomial name
- Ledebouria minima (Baker) S.Venter

= Ledebouria minima =

Species of flowering plant

Ledebouria minima is a species of bulbous flowering plant in the family Asparagaceae, native to South Africa.

== Description ==
The leaves of Ledebouria ovalifolia are small (shorter than the inflorescence), thin, linear in shape, and pointing upwards or spreading. They often have purple-coloured bands near the base of the leaf.

The flowers are stellate in shape, and are borne on a long inflorescence.
