= Ledebouria grandifolia =

Conservation status
- Least Concern (IUCN 3.1)

Scientific classification
- Kingdom: Plantae
- Clade: Tracheophytes
- Clade: Angiosperms
- Clade: Monocots
- Order: Asparagales
- Family: Asparagaceae
- Subfamily: Scilloideae
- Genus: Ledebouria
- Species: L. grandifolia

Binomial name
- Ledebouria grandifolia (Balf.f.) A.G.Mill. & D.Alexander

Synonyms
- Haemanthus grandifolius Balf.f.

Species of plant

Ledebouria grandifolia is a species of flowering plant in the Asparagaceae family. It is endemic to Socotra. Its natural habitats are subtropical or tropical dry forests and rocky areas.

== Etymology ==
Ledebouria is named for Carl Friedrich von Ledebour (1785-1851), a botanist who published, among other things, the first complete Russian flora.
