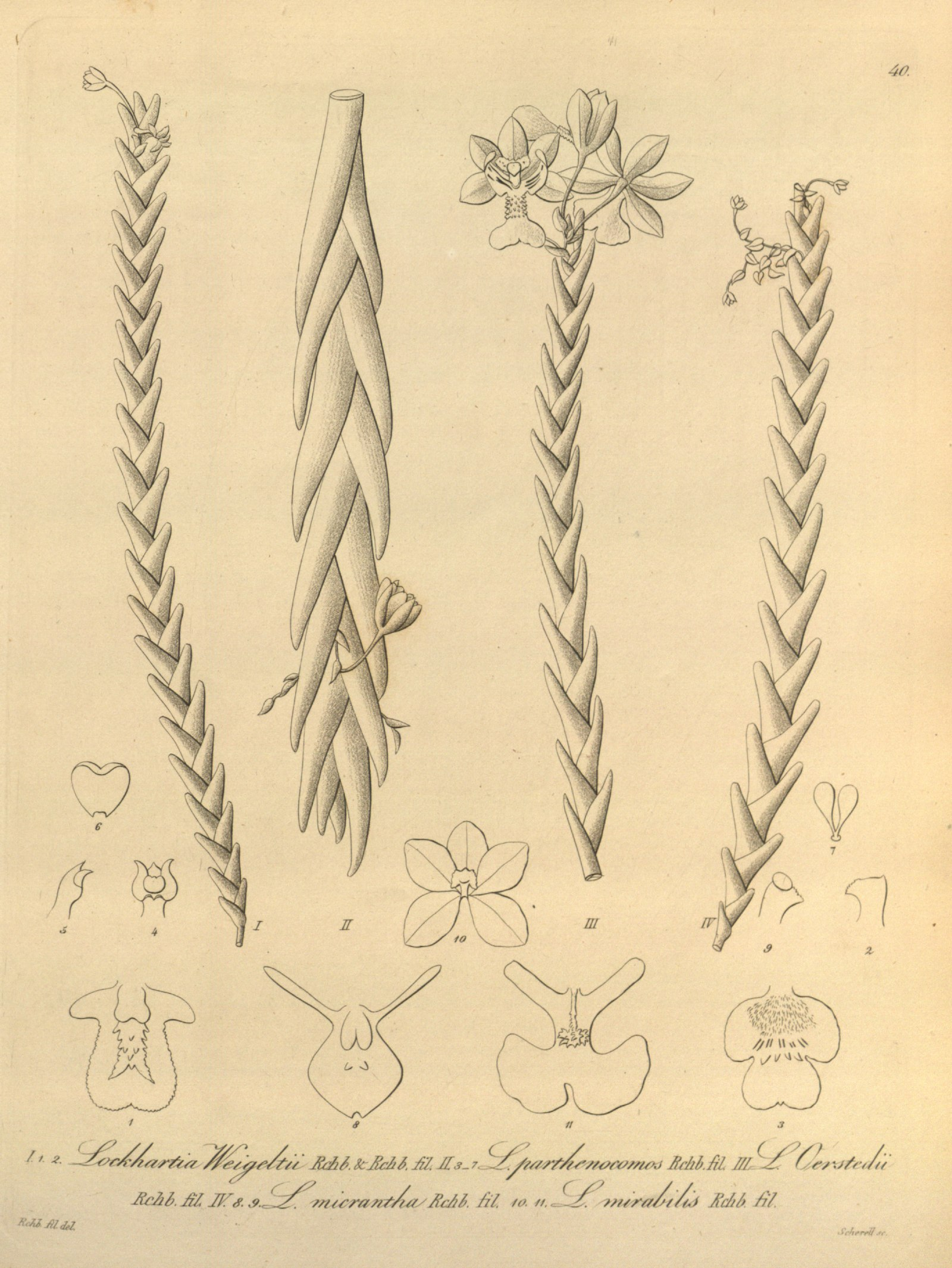
- 1858 illustration

Scientific classification
- Kingdom: Plantae
- Clade: Tracheophytes
- Clade: Angiosperms
- Clade: Monocots
- Order: Asparagales
- Family: Orchidaceae
- Subfamily: Epidendroideae
- Genus: Lockhartia
- Species: L. parthenocomos

Binomial name
- Lockhartia parthenocomos (Rchb.f.) Rchb.f.

Synonyms
- Fernandezia parthenocomos Rchb.f. (basionym); Lockhartia parthenocomos var. crispula Regel

= Lockhartia parthenocomos =

Species of orchid

Lockhartia parthenocomos is a species of orchid native to South America. This species is epiphytic and occurs in montane forests and cloud forests.
