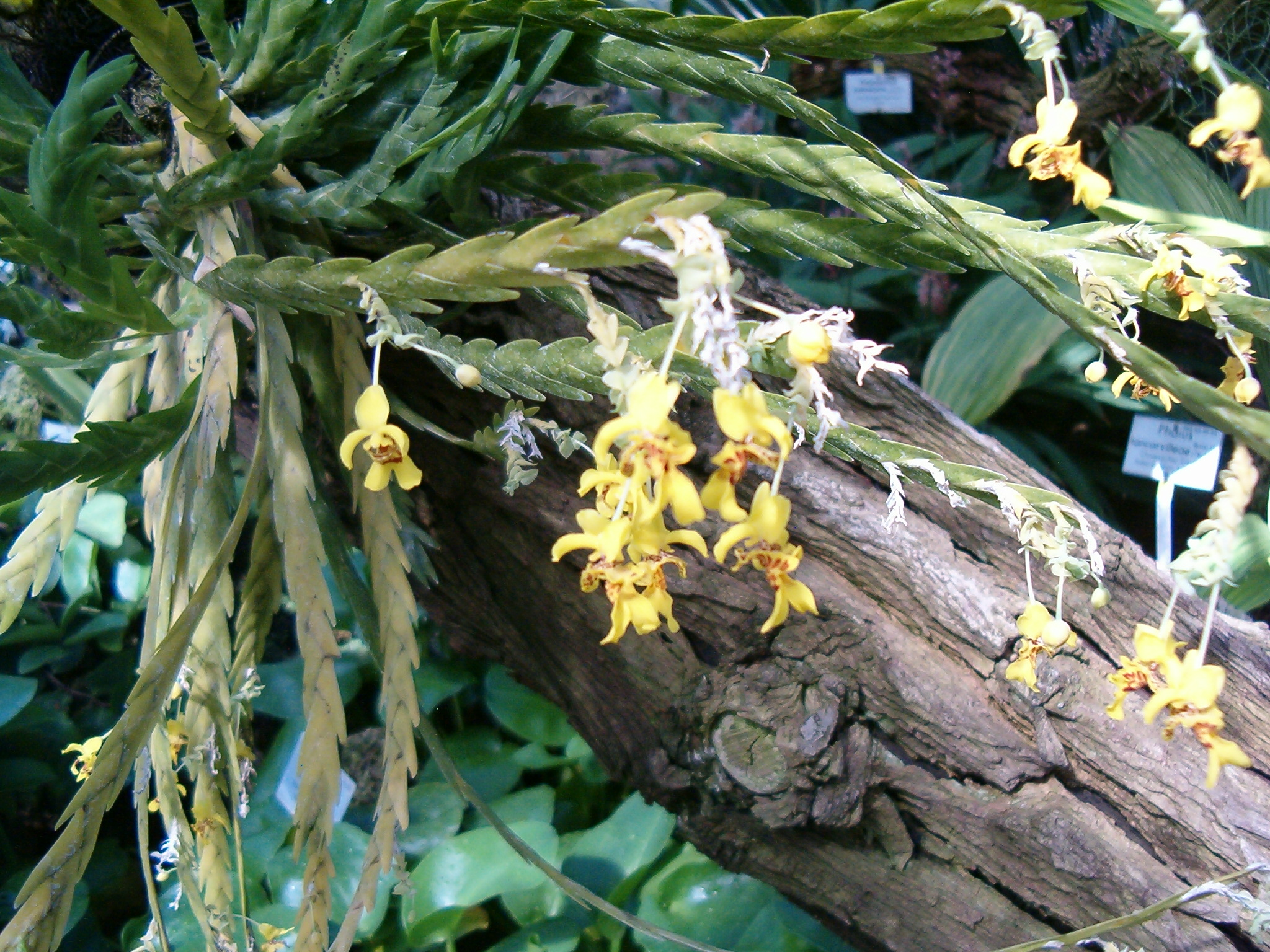
- Lockhartia oerstedii

Scientific classification
- Kingdom: Plantae
- Clade: Tracheophytes
- Clade: Angiosperms
- Clade: Monocots
- Order: Asparagales
- Family: Orchidaceae
- Subfamily: Epidendroideae
- Tribe: Cymbidieae
- Subtribe: Oncidiinae
- Genus: Lockhartia; Hook.

Type species
- Lockhartia elegans Hook.

Synonyms
- Fernandezia Lindl., illegitimate name; Lockhartiopsis Archila, invalid name; Neobennettia Senghas

= Lockhartia =

Genus of orchids

Lockhartia, abbreviated Lhta. in the horticultural trade, is a genus of orchids (family Orchidaceae) and the only genus of alliance Lockhartia. There are about 30 species, distributed from Mexico through northern South America, as well as in Trinidad.

== List of species ==
Species accepted as of June 2014

1. Lockhartia acuta (Lindl.) Rchb.f.
2. Lockhartia amoena Endres & Rchb.f.
3. Lockhartia bennettii Dodson
4. Lockhartia chocoensis Kraenzl.
5. Lockhartia dipleura Schltr.
6. Lockhartia galeottiana Soto Arenas
7. Lockhartia genegeorgei D.E.Benn. & Christenson
8. Lockhartia goyazensis Rchb.f.
9. Lockhartia hercodonta Rchb.f. ex Kraenzl.
10. Lockhartia imbricata (Lam.) Hoehne
11. Lockhartia ivainae M.F.F.Silva & A.T.Oliveira
12. Lockhartia latilabris C.Schweinf.
13. Lockhartia lepticaula D.E.Benn. & Christenson
14. Lockhartia longifolia (Lindl.) Schltr.
15. Lockhartia ludibunda Rchb.f.
16. Lockhartia lunifera (Lindl.) Rchb.f.
17. Lockhartia micrantha Rchb.f.
18. Lockhartia niesseniae Kolan. & O.Pérez
19. Lockhartia oblongicallosa Carnevali & G.A.Romero
20. Lockhartia obtusata L.O.Williams
21. Lockhartia odontochila Kraenzl.
22. Lockhartia oerstedii Rchb.f.
23. Lockhartia parthenocomos (Rchb.f.) Rchb.f.
24. Lockhartia pittieri Schltr.
25. Lockhartia schunkei D.E.Benn. & Christenson
26. Lockhartia serra Rchb.f.
27. Lockhartia triangulabia Ames & C.Schweinf.
28. Lockhartia tuberculata D.E.Benn. & Christenson
29. Lockhartia variabilis Ames & C.Schweinf.
30. Lockhartia viruensis E.M.Pessoa & M.Alves
