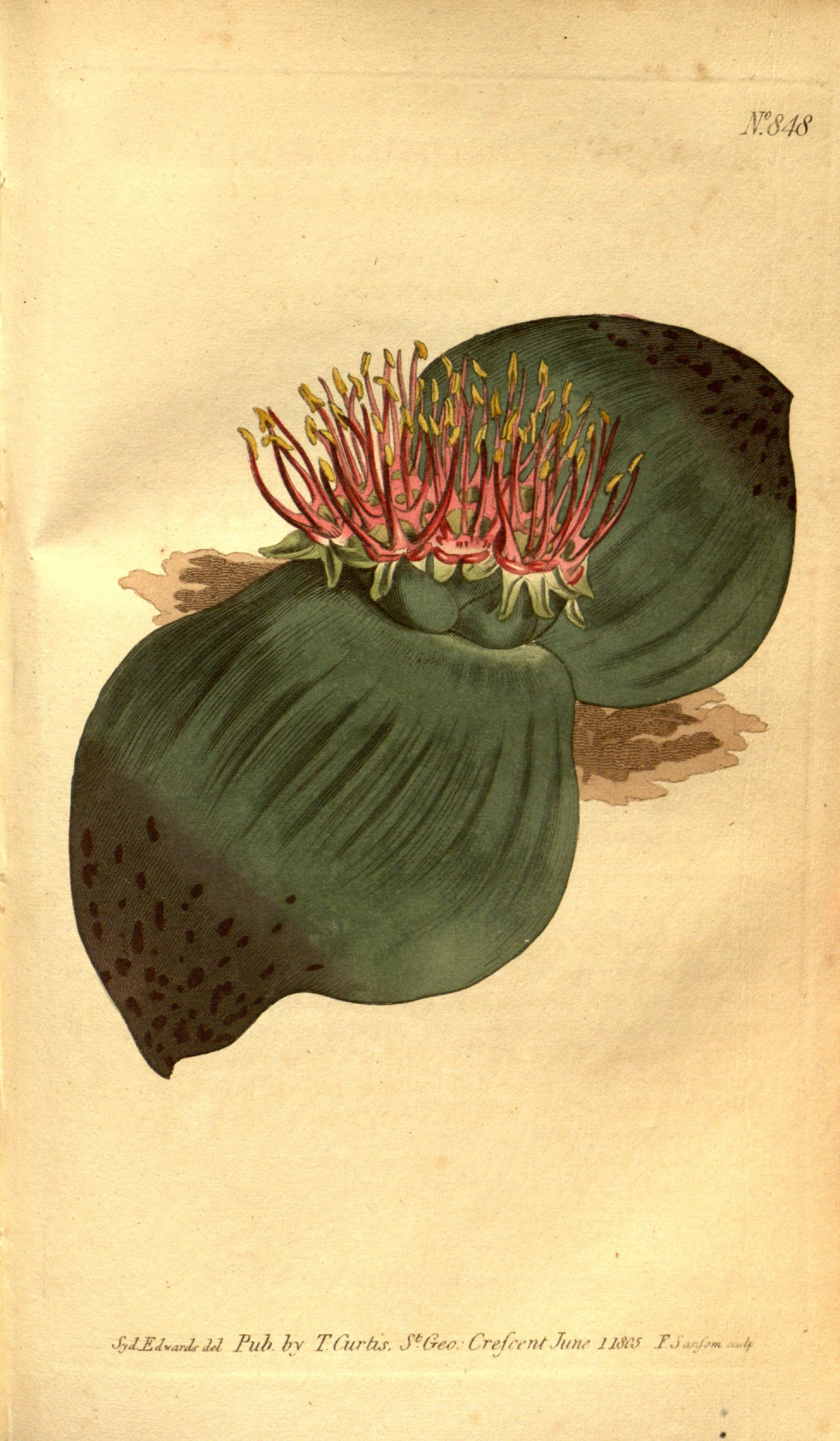

Scientific classification
- Kingdom: Plantae
- Clade: Tracheophytes
- Clade: Angiosperms
- Clade: Monocots
- Order: Asparagales
- Family: Asparagaceae
- Subfamily: Scilloideae
- Genus: Massonia
- Species: M. depressa

Binomial name
- Massonia depressa Houtt. (1780) Synonyms: Massonia brachypus Baker; Massonia coronata Jacq.; Massonia grandiflora Lindl.; Massonia grandifolia Ker Gawl.; Massonia latifolia L.f.; Massonia namaquensis Baker; Massonia obovata Jacq.; Massonia sanguinea Jacq.; Massonia triflora Compton

= Massonia depressa =

Species of flowering plant

Massonia depressa, the hedgehog lily, is a species of flowering plant in the family Asparagaceae. It is a bulbous geophyte native to the Cape Provinces and Free State of South Africa. Growing to 10 cm (3.9 in) tall by 50 cm (20 in) broad, it is a bulbous perennial with two opposite leaves lying flat on the ground. A spiky cluster of white, yellow or brown flowers appears at the centre of the plant in winter. The flowers are uniquely scented like yeast, to attract pollination by gerbils and other rodents. The anther is exceptionally long - up to 2mm. The seed capsules are inflated, enabling them to be wind-borne.

This species has been observed to be variable in the wild, and numerous attempts have been made to resolve its true relationships within the genus Massonia, so far without success.

The Latin specific epithet depressa means "having a flattened appearance", a feature common to all in this genus.

When cultivated in a temperate environment, M. depressa does not tolerate freezing temperatures, so must be grown under glass in a cold greenhouse or similar. It requires full sun, and dry conditions during the dormant season (starting in spring). It has been given the Royal Horticultural Society's Award of Garden Merit.

== See also ==
- List of plants known as lily
