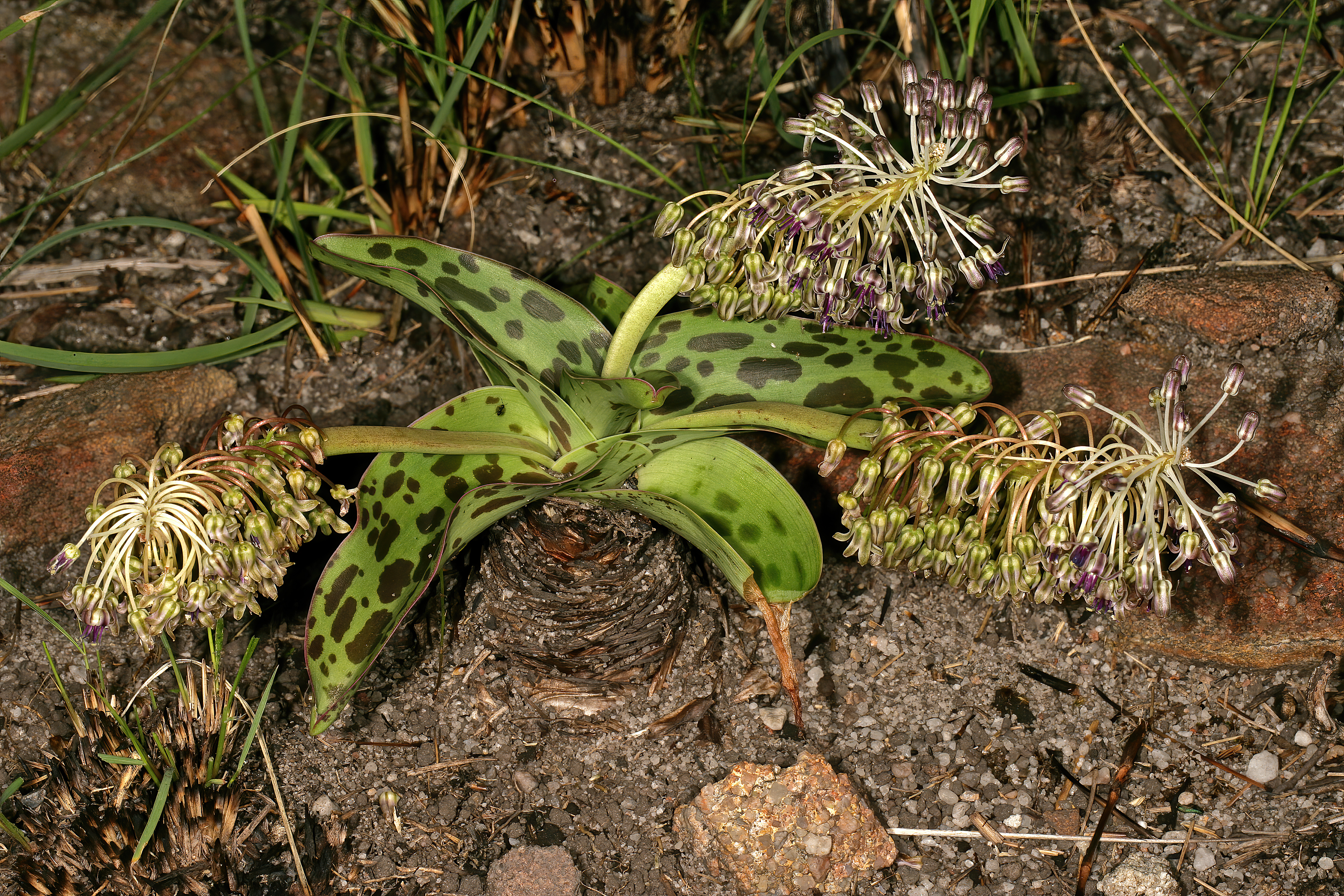

Scientific classification
- Kingdom: Plantae
- Clade: Tracheophytes
- Clade: Angiosperms
- Clade: Monocots
- Order: Asparagales
- Family: Asparagaceae
- Subfamily: Scilloideae
- Genus: Ledebouria
- Species: L. floribunda

Binomial name
- Ledebouria floribunda (Baker) Jessop

Synonyms
- Drimia pendula Burch. ex Baker; Scilla floribunda Baker; Scilla lauta N.E.Br. Scilla pendula Baker; Scilla polyantha Baker; Scilla princeps Baker; Scilla subsecunda Baker

= Ledebouria floribunda =

Species of plant

Ledebouria floribunda is a species of flowering plant in the Asparagaceae family. It is a bulbous geophyte native to South Africa, Eswatini, and Lesotho.

== Uses ==
A number of homoisoflavanones can be isolated from the bulbs of L. floribunda.

== Etymology ==
Ledebouria is named for Carl Friedrich von Ledebour (1785–1851), a botanist who published, among other things, the first complete Russian flora.
