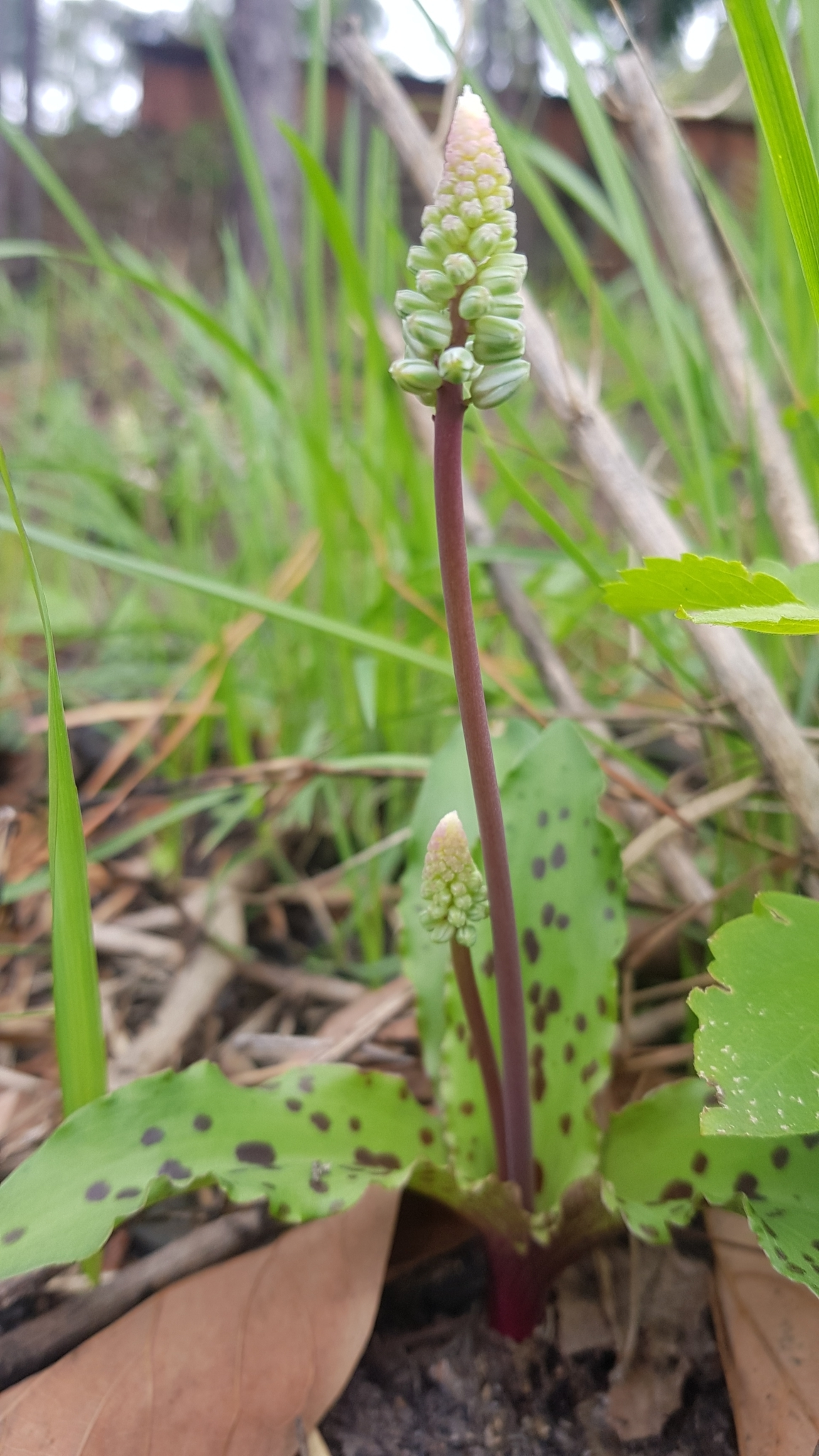

Scientific classification
- Kingdom: Plantae
- Clade: Tracheophytes
- Clade: Angiosperms
- Clade: Monocots
- Order: Asparagales
- Family: Asparagaceae
- Subfamily: Scilloideae
- Genus: Resnova
- Species: R. humifusa

Binomial name
- Resnova humifusa (Baker) U.Müll.-Doblies & D.Müll.-Doblies

Synonyms
- Drimiopsis humifusa (Baker) Baker; Drimiopsis maxima Baker; Drimiopsis saundersiae Baker; Ledebouria humifusa (Baker) J.C.Manning & Goldblatt; Ledebouria transvaalensis (van der Merwe) J.C.Manning & Goldblatt; Resnova schlechteri (Baker) van der Merwe; Resnova transvaalensis van der Merwe; Scilla humifusa Baker Scilla schlechteri Baker

= Resnova humifusa =

Species of plant

Resnova humifusa is a species of flowering plant in the Asparagaceae family. It is a bulbous perennial plant, native to the Northern Provinces and KwaZulu-Natal in South Africa.

The homoisoflavanone 5,6-dimethoxy-7-hydroxy-3-(4′-hydroxybenzyl)-4-chromanone can be found in the bulbs of R. humifusa.
