= Ledebouria ovalifolia =

Scientific classification
- Kingdom: Plantae
- Clade: Embryophytes
- Clade: Tracheophytes
- Clade: Angiosperms
- Clade: Monocots
- Order: Asparagales
- Family: Asparagaceae
- Subfamily: Scilloideae
- Genus: Ledebouria
- Species: L. ovalifolia

Binomial name
- Ledebouria ovalifolia (Schrad.) Jessop

Species of flowering plant

Ledebouria ovalifolia is a species of bulbous flowering plant in the family Asparagaceae, native to the Cape Provinces of South Africa.

== Description ==
The leaves of Ledebouria ovalifolia have obtuse tips, and the upper leaf surface has small lines of papillae. The leaves are pressed close against the ground (or occasionally partially spreading) and they are partly emerged when the flowers appear.

The flowers are born laxly, usually on a solitary inflorescence. The flowers are purple-to-white, with violet anthers. The ovary has 3 lobes.

Unlike some other Ledebouria species, both the leaves and the live bulb scales of L. ovalifolia do not have any threads when torn.
