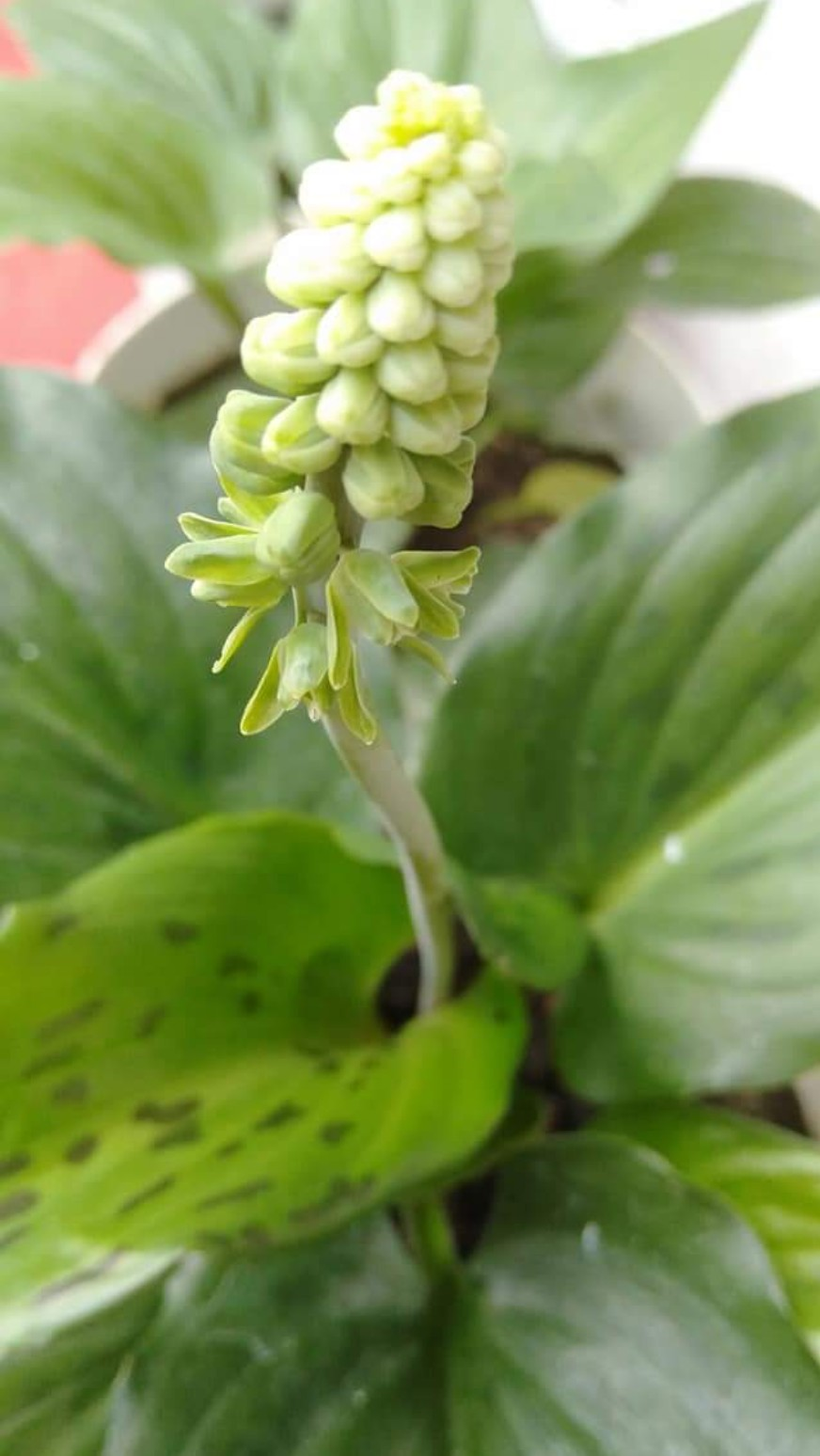

Scientific classification
- Kingdom: Plantae
- Clade: Tracheophytes
- Clade: Angiosperms
- Clade: Monocots
- Order: Asparagales
- Family: Asparagaceae
- Subfamily: Scilloideae
- Genus: Drimiopsis
- Species: D. maculata

Binomial name
- Drimiopsis maculata Lindl. & Paxton Fl. Gard. 2: 73 (1851)

Synonyms
- Drimia petiolata K.Koch & C.D.Bouché (1861); Drimiopsis minor Baker (1870); Ledebouria petiolata J.C.Manning & Goldblatt (2003 publ. 2004)

= Drimiopsis maculata =

Species of flowering plant

Drimiopsis maculata, also known by the common names little white soldiers, African false hosta, leopard's ears, African hosta, leopard plant, and Injoba is a flowering plant species in the genus Drimiopsis. It is the type species of its genus. It occurs from Tanzania to South Africa.

Scillascillin-type homoisoflavanones can be isolated from D. maculata.
