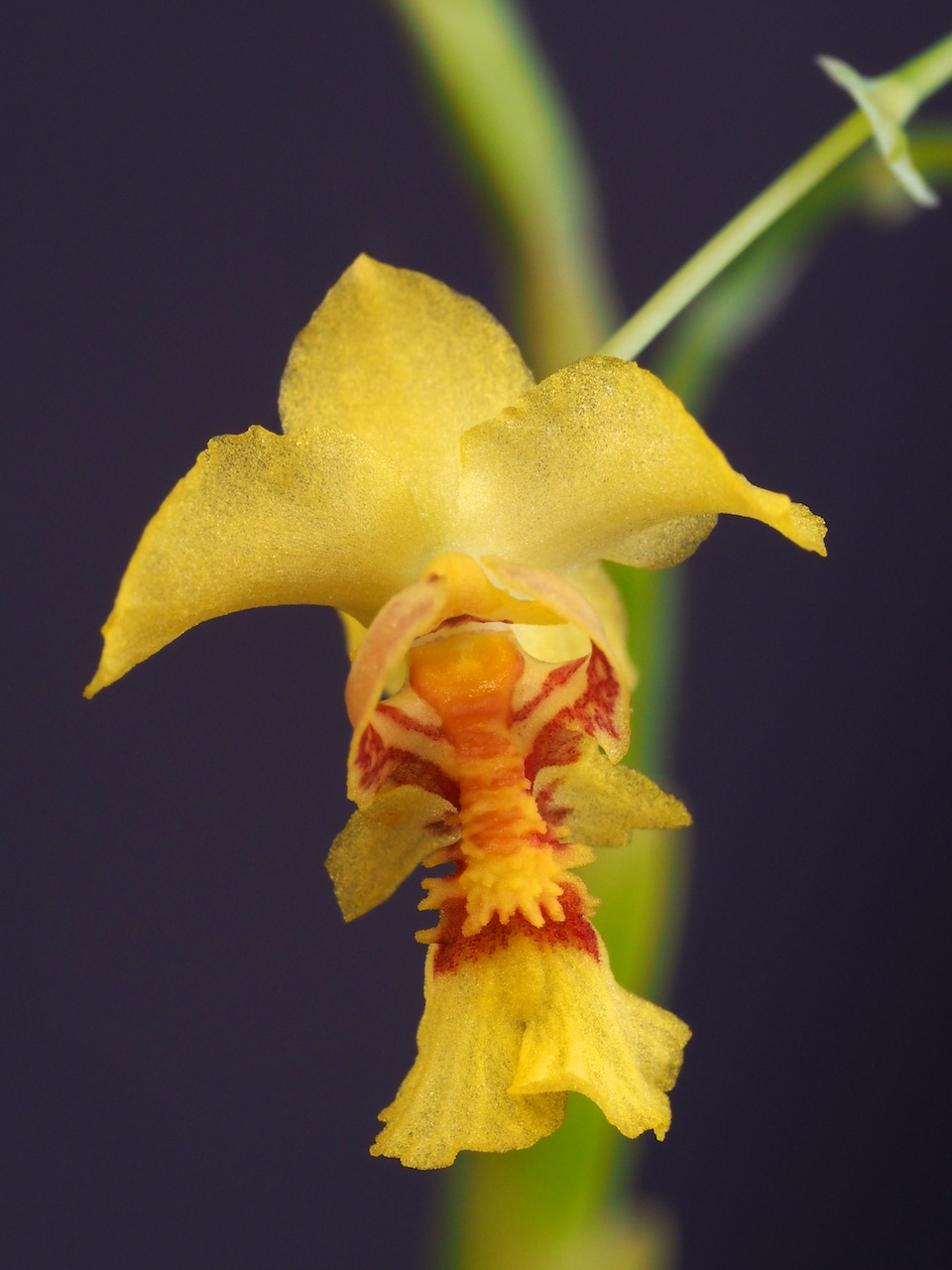

Scientific classification
- Kingdom: Plantae
- Clade: Tracheophytes
- Clade: Angiosperms
- Clade: Monocots
- Order: Asparagales
- Family: Orchidaceae
- Subfamily: Epidendroideae
- Genus: Lockhartia
- Species: L. lunifera

Binomial name
- Lockhartia lunifera (Lindl.) Rchb.f.

Synonyms
- Fernandezia lunifera Lindl. (basionym); Fernandezia robusta Klotzsch ex Rchb.f.

= Lockhartia lunifera =

Species of orchid

Lockhartia lunifera is a species of orchid endemic to Brazil.
