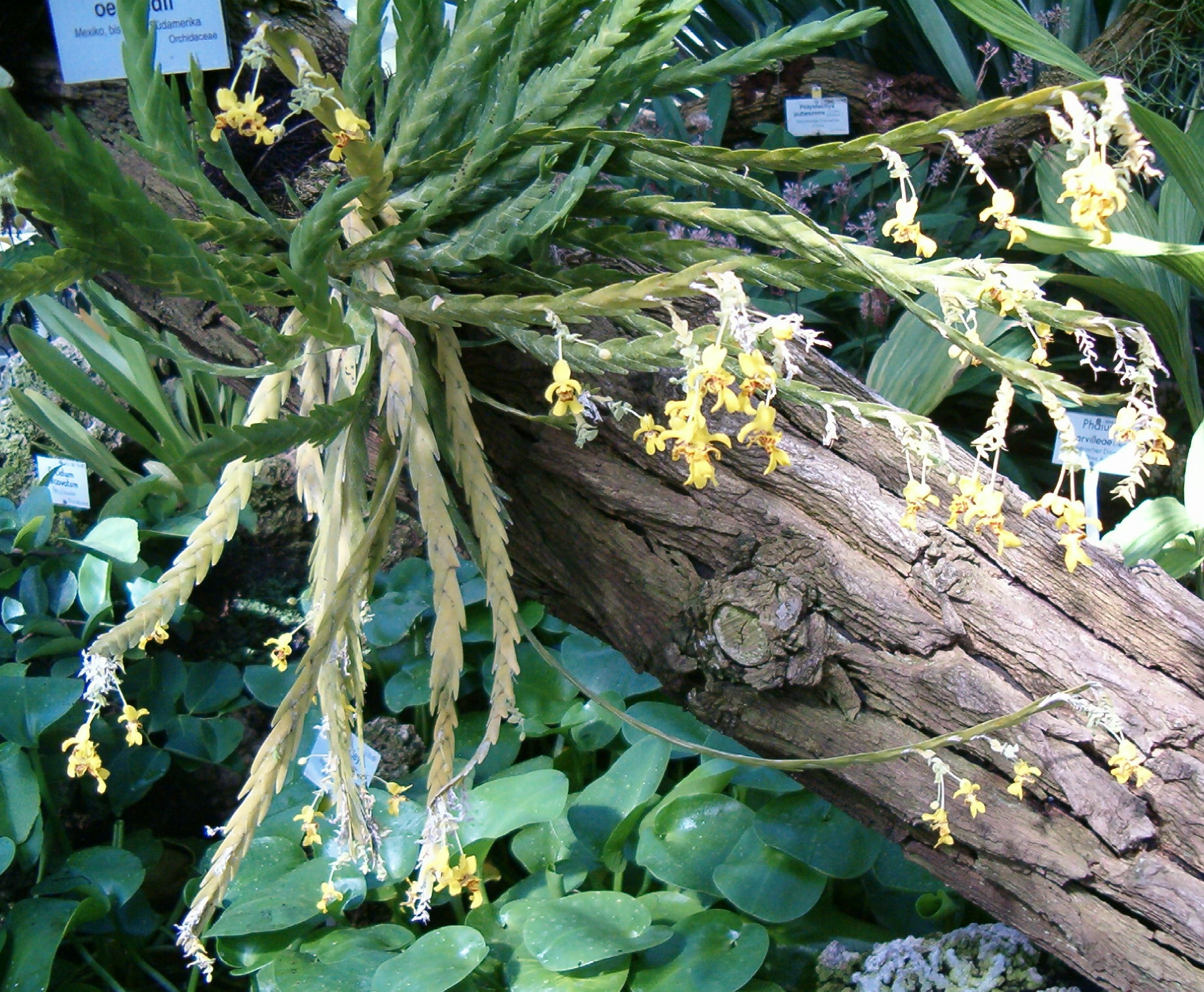

Scientific classification
- Kingdom: Plantae
- Clade: Tracheophytes
- Clade: Angiosperms
- Clade: Monocots
- Order: Asparagales
- Family: Orchidaceae
- Subfamily: Epidendroideae
- Genus: Lockhartia
- Species: L. oerstedii

Binomial name
- Lockhartia oerstedii Rchb.f.

Synonyms
- Lockhartia verrucosa Rchb.f.; Lockhartia lamellosa Rchb.f.; Fernandezia robusta Bateman; Lockhartia robusta (Bateman) Schltr.

= Lockhartia oerstedii =

Species of orchid

Lockhartia oerstedii is a species of orchid native to Mexico, Guatemala, Nicaragua, Honduras, Costa Rica, Panama and Colombia. The species usually grows in mountain forests.
