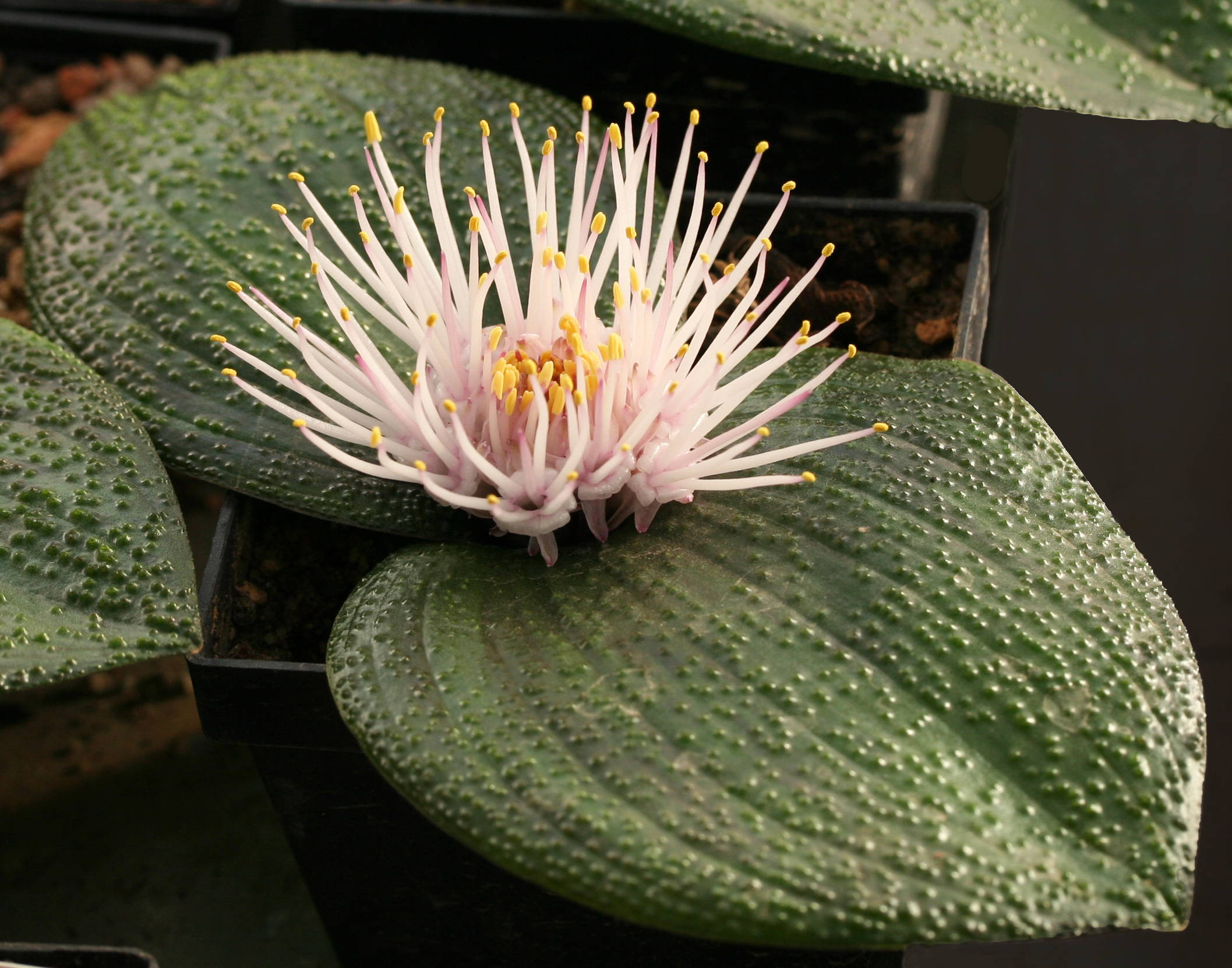
- Massonia longipes in cultivation

Scientific classification
- Kingdom: Plantae
- Clade: Tracheophytes
- Clade: Angiosperms
- Clade: Monocots
- Order: Asparagales
- Family: Asparagaceae
- Subfamily: Scilloideae
- Genus: Massonia; Thunb. ex Houtt.

Type species
- Massonia depressa

Synonyms
- Podocallis Salisb.; Whiteheadia Harv.

= Massonia =

Genus of flowering plants

Massonia is a genus of bulbous perennial flowering plants in the family Asparagaceae, subfamily Scilloideae (also treated as the family Hyacinthaceae). It is native to southern Africa, and is found in localities such as Namaqualand with hot and dry summers, being dormant in summer and growing during winter. The genus Whiteheadia has been merged into Massonia. It is classed as a cryptophyte.

The genus is named for Francis Masson, a Scottish botanist, gardener, and Kew Gardens’ first plant hunter.

== Description ==
Massonia grows from underground bulbs whose outer tunic is pale brown and papery or leathery. Two relatively broad leaves appear at the same time as the flowers, spreading out on either side, sometimes lying flat on the ground. The flowers are borne in a raceme, which may be short and held at ground level. There may be a "tuft" of green bracts at the top of the inflorescence. Individual flowers are pale in colour, white, or with green, yellow or pink tones. They are bell-shaped or somewhat tubular, with the tepals joined at the base forming a short or long tube. The stamens are more-or-less erect, with their filaments joined to the end of the tube formed by the tepals and also to each other, forming a small cup. The seeds are dull black.

The species Massonia depressa has been shown to be pollinated by rodents, including two species of gerbil (Gerbillurus paeba and Desmodillus auricularis). Very few species of plant are rodent-pollinated.

== Systematics ==
The genus name was attributed to Carl Peter Thunberg by Maarten Houttuyn in 1780. It honours the Scottish botanist and gardener Francis Masson. A molecular phylogenetic study showed Massonia to be monophyletic, but also that the two species of the genus Whiteheadia were placed separately at the base of the Massonia clade, rendering Whiteheadia paraphyletic. Accordingly, Manning et al. transferred W. bifolia and W. etesionamibensis to Massonia.

Massonia is the type genus of the subtribe Massoniinae which is placed in the tribe Hyacintheae (or the tribe Massonieae in the subfamily Hyacinthoideae for those who accept the family Hyacinthaceae). It is most closely related to the genus Lachenalia.

=== Species ===
As of December 2021, Plants of the World Online accepted the following species:

- Massonia amoena Mart.-Azorín, M.Pinter & Wetschnig
- Massonia angustifolia L.f.
- Massonia bakeriana M.Pinter, Mart.-Azorín & Wetschnig
- Massonia bifolia (Jacq.) J.C.Manning & Goldblatt
- Massonia calvata Baker
- Massonia dentata Mart.-Azorín, V.R.Clark, M.Pinter, M.B.Crespo & Wetschnig
- Massonia depressa Houtt.
- Massonia dregei Baker
- Massonia echinata L.f.
- Massonia etesionamibensis (U.Müll.-Doblies & D.Müll.-Doblies) J.C.Manning & Goldblatt
- Massonia gypsicola Mart.-Azorín, M.Pinter, M.B.Crespo, M.Á.Alonso & Wetschnig
- Massonia hirsuta Link & Otto
- Massonia inaequalis W.F.Barker ex Mart.-Azorín, M.Pinter, M.B.Crespo, M.Á.Alonso
- Massonia jasminiflora Burch. ex Baker
- Massonia latebrosa Masson ex Baker
- Massonia longipes Baker
- Massonia luteovirens (Mart.-Azorín, M.Pinter & Wetschnig) J.C.Manning
- Massonia mimetica Mart.-Azorín, M.Pinter, M.B.Crespo & Wetschnig
- Massonia obermeyerae Mart.-Azorín, A.P.Dold, M.Pinter & Wetschnig
- Massonia pseudoechinata Mart.-Azorín, M.Pinter & Wetschnig
- Massonia pustulata Jacq.
- Massonia pygmaea Schltdl. ex Kunth
- Massonia roggeveldensis Mart.-Azorín, M.Pinter & Wetschnig
- Massonia saniensis Wetschnig, Mart.-Azorín & M.Pinter
- Massonia sempervirens U.Müll.-Doblies, G.Milkuhn & D.Müll.-Doblies
- Massonia sessiliflora (Dinter) Mart.-Azorín, M.B.Crespo, M.Pinter & Wetschnig
- Massonia setulosa Baker
- Massonia tenella Sol. ex Baker
- Massonia thunbergiana Wetschnig, Mart.-Azorín & M.Pinter
- Massonia triflora Compton
- Massonia wittebergensis U.Müll.-Doblies & D.Müll.-Doblies

== Cultivation ==
Massonia species have been described as "essentially plants for the collector". They require the protection of an alpine house or bulb frame in regions subject to frosts. Well-drained soil and a sunny situation are considered essential. They can be propagated by seed, flowering after at least two to four years.
