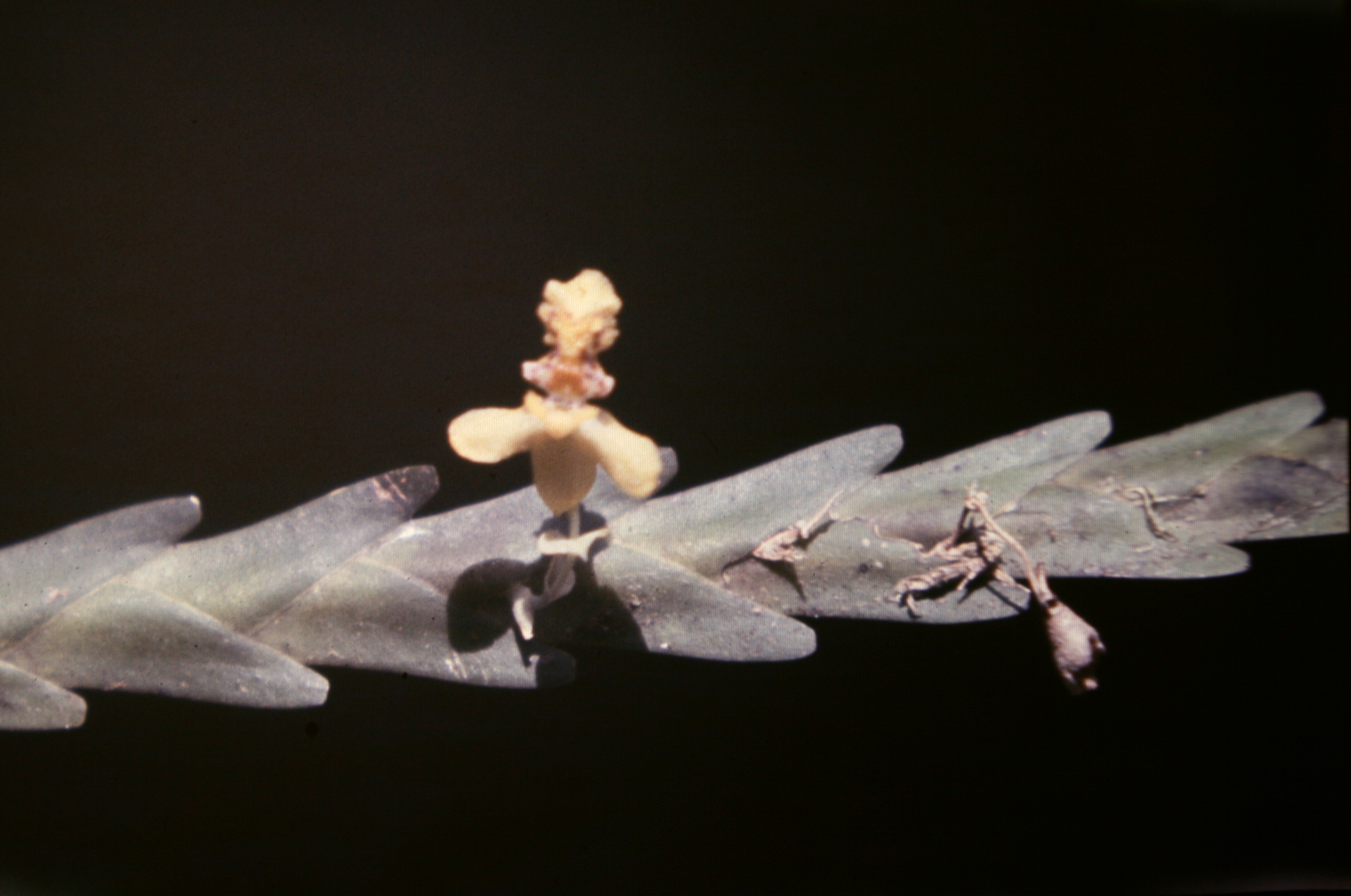

Scientific classification
- Kingdom: Plantae
- Clade: Tracheophytes
- Clade: Angiosperms
- Clade: Monocots
- Order: Asparagales
- Family: Orchidaceae
- Subfamily: Epidendroideae
- Genus: Lockhartia
- Species: L. imbricata

Binomial name
- Lockhartia imbricata (Lam.) Hoehne

Synonyms
- Epidendrum imbricatum Lam. (basionym); Epidendrum biserrum Rich.; Fernandezia elegans (Hook.) Lodd.; Lockhartia elegans Hook.; Lockhartia obtusifolia Regel; Lockhartia weigeltii Rchb. & Rchb.f.; Lockhartia obtusa Regel; Lockhartia floribunda Rchb.f.; Fernandezia obtusa Lindl. ex Linden; Lockhartia biserra (Rich.) Christenson & Garay

= Lockhartia imbricata =

Species of orchid

Lockhartia imbricata is a species of orchid found from Trinidad to tropical South America It is an epiphytic species growing in humid forests.
