= Francis Masson =

Scottish botanist

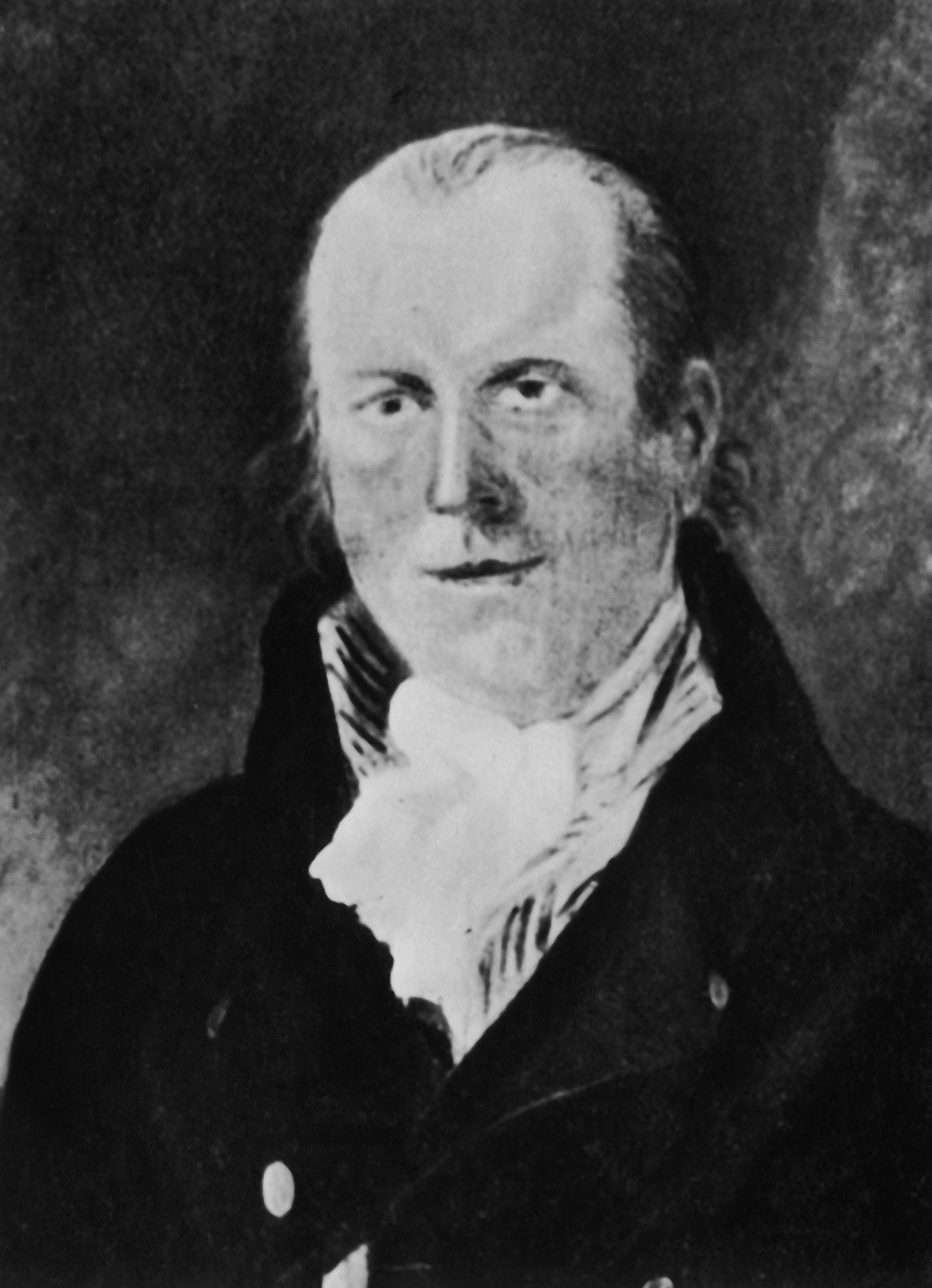
- Born: August 1741; Aberdeen, Scotland
- Died: 23 December 1805 (aged 64); Montreal, Canada
- Known for: Stapeliae Novae; describing more than 1700 plant species
- Scientific career
- Fields: Botany, horticulture
- Workplaces: Kew Gardens
- Author abbrev. (botany): Masson

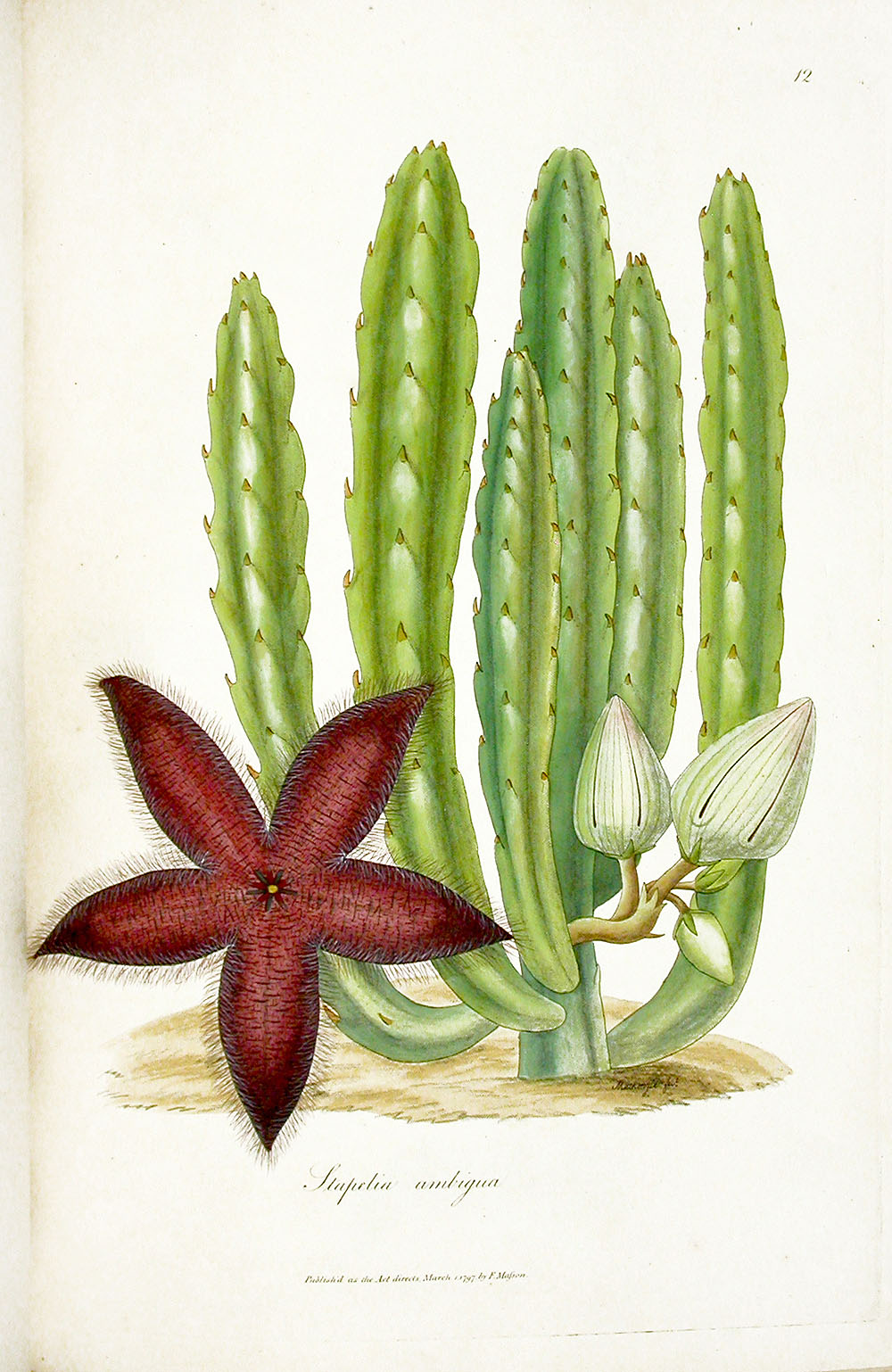
Botanical illustration of Stapelia ambigua from Masson's 1796 publication

Francis Masson (August 1741 – 23 December 1805) was a Scottish botanist and gardener, and Kew Gardens’ first plant hunter.

== Life ==
Masson was born in Aberdeen.

In the 1760s, he went to work at Kew Gardens as an under-gardener. Masson was the first plant collector to be sent abroad by the newly appointed director Sir Joseph Banks; he sailed with James Cook on HMS Resolution to South Africa, landing in October 1772. Masson stayed until 1775, during which time he sent back to England over 500 species of plant.

In 1776, Banks sent Masson abroad again, this time to Madeira, Canary Islands, the Azores and the Antilles. Whilst in Grenada, Masson was captured and imprisoned by the French, a traumatic experience which haunted him for the rest of his life. Although he was eventually released, his collections deteriorated during the delay in securing a passage home, and a hurricane in St. Lucia destroyed almost all of what little had survived. Returning to Kew, Masson found the gardening life tedious by comparison, and again turned to Banks for another opportunity to collect abroad. However, the war with France had made such ventures increasingly difficult.

In 1783, Masson collected plants in Portugal, and in October 1785, he left England on his second voyage to South Africa. The political climate there had altered much since his first visit, owing to the attempt by a British expeditionary force to annex the Cape in 1781. The restrictions imposed on his movements by the Governor caused Masson considerable frustration, and when he sailed for England in March 1795, his plant collections bore little comparison with those of his triumphant first expedition.

In September 1797, Masson set sail for North America. The voyage was particularly perilous, his ship captured by a French pirate. Anticipating execution, Masson and his fellow travellers were much relieved to find themselves transferred to a German vessel bound for Baltimore, whence he was able to secure a passage to New York City, arriving in December. During the next seven years he travelled widely collecting plants and seeds, visiting Niagara Peninsula and Lake Ontario, but amassed only 24 new species, a minuscule tally compared with his South African spoils.

== Death ==
Masson was unsuited to the harsh winters of North America. He died after a short illness in Montreal on 23 December 1805, and was buried there at the Scotch Presbyterian Church (later known as the St. Gabriel Street Church) on Christmas Day.

== Legacy ==
Masson described in excess of 1,700 new species including:

- Agapanthus inapertus, Drooping Agapanthus
- Amaryllis belladonna, Belladonna Lily
- Zantedeschia aethiopica, Arum Lily
- Strelitzia reginae, Bird of Paradise Flower
- Senecio cruenta, Cineraria
- Protea cynaroides, King Protea
- Kniphofia rooperi, Red Hot Poker
- Trillium grandiflorum, Great White Trillium

== Publications ==
Masson’s only book, Stapeliae Novae, on the South African succulents also known as "carrion-flowers" because of their smell, was published in 1796.

== Eponymy ==
The genus of plants Massonia is named for Masson. There is a commemorative plaque to Masson in the Cruickshank Botanic Garden, Old Aberdeen.

== See also ==
- List of gardener-botanist explorers of the Enlightenment
- European and American voyages of scientific exploration
