= Werner de Lachenal =

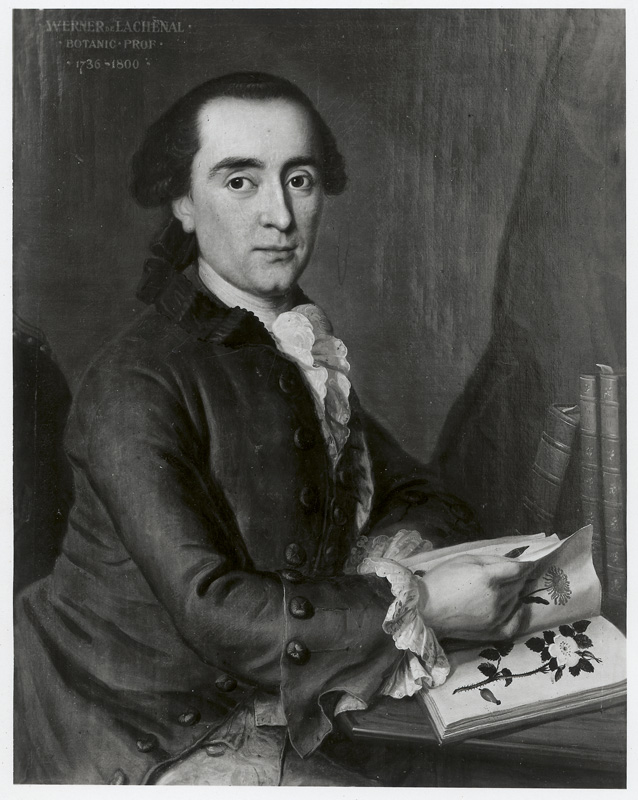

Wernhard "Werner" de Lachenal (23 October 1736 – 4 October 1800) was a Swiss physician and a professor of anatomy who also worked on medical botany. He was a professor at the University of Basel. The plant genus Lachenalia was named after him by the botanist Jacquin.

== Life and work ==
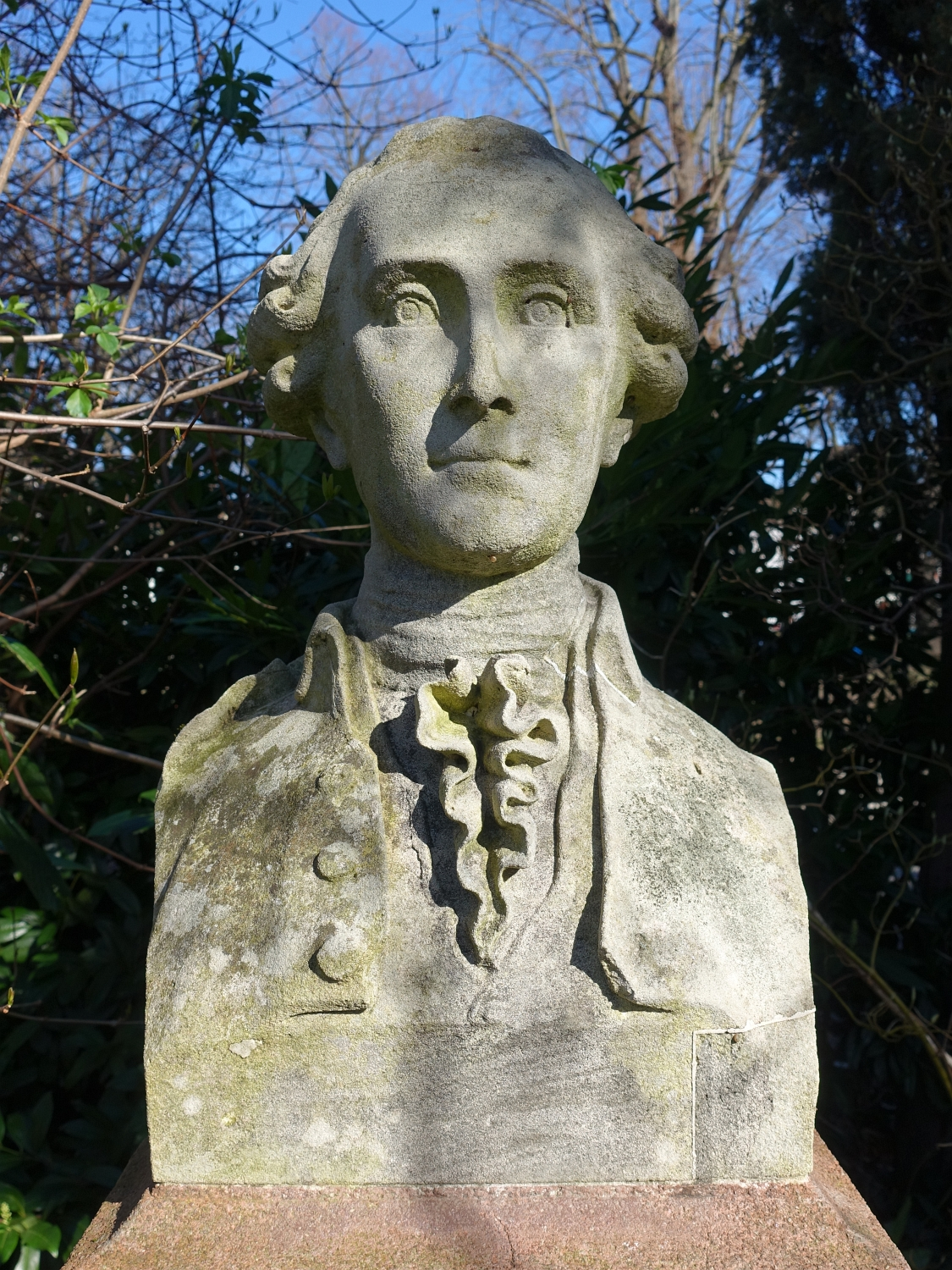
Memorial bust in Basel

De Lachenal was born in Basel, son of pharmacist Johann Jakob de Lachenal (1708–1749) and Mary Margaretha née Gottfried. He was encouraged to study medicine by great uncle Zwinger and this drifted into botany. He studied at Basel, Strasbourg and Montbéliard (under David Charles Emmanuel Berdot), taking a doctorate in 1763 from Basel. In 1776 he became a professor of botany (materia medica) and anatomy at Basel. He reorganized the botanical garden and corresponded with Linnaeus on plants. He collected plants from the region and brought together a large herbarium which was examined by Carl Friedrich Hagenbach.

He corresponded with Albrecht von Haller and wrote in the Acta helvetica. He was rector for the university in 1783-84 and 1795–96. He married Margaretha Passavant in 1763.

The standard author abbreviation Lachen. is used to indicate this person as the author when citing a botanical name.
