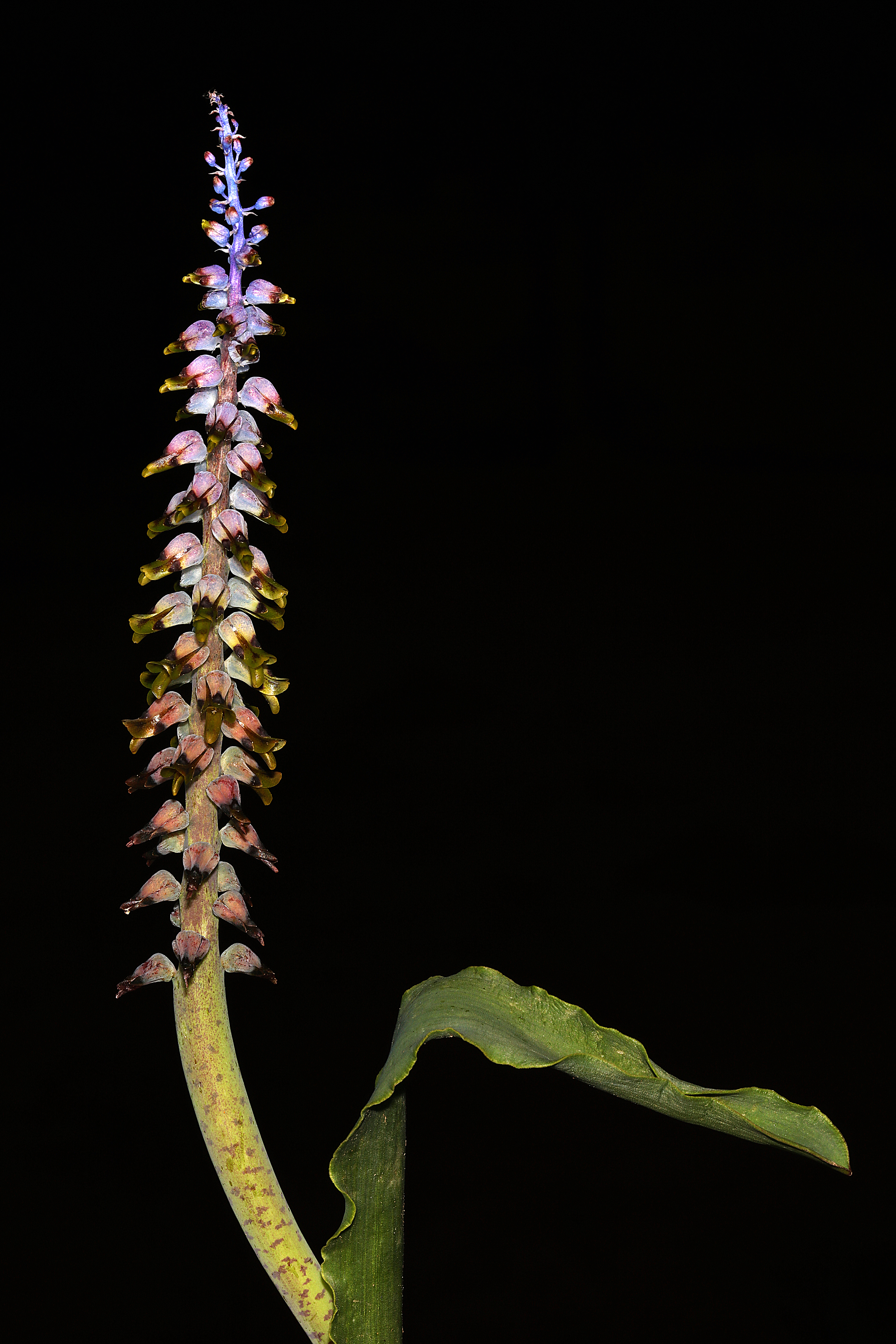
- Lachenalia mutabilis

Scientific classification
- Kingdom: Plantae
- Clade: Embryophytes
- Clade: Tracheophytes
- Clade: Spermatophytes
- Clade: Angiosperms
- Clade: Monocots
- Order: Asparagales
- Family: Asparagaceae
- Subfamily: Scilloideae
- Genus: Lachenalia
- Species: L. mutabilis

Binomial name
- Lachenalia mutabilis G.Lodd. ex Schult. & Schult.f.

Synonyms
- Lachenalia mutabilis G.Lodd.; Orchiastrum mutabile (Sweet) Lem.

= Lachenalia mutabilis =

Species of flowering plant

Lachenalia mutabilis is a plant species in the Lachenalia genus. Lachenalia mutabilis can be found in western South Africa.

This bulbous geophyte grows from 10–45 cm (3.9–17.7 in) tall. This species can grow 1 or more lanceolate with a noticeable bend at their midribs. The leaves can be reddish, and they can be spotted at the bottom. The bulbs are 1–4 cm (0.39–1.57 in) large. The tubular flowers change color as they mature, the young flowers are purple and the mature flowers are yellow. The seed pods start green then turn brown over time until they eventually open to spread its seeds.
