= Lachenalia ensifolia =

Scientific classification
- Kingdom: Plantae
- Clade: Embryophytes
- Clade: Tracheophytes
- Clade: Angiosperms
- Clade: Monocots
- Order: Asparagales
- Family: Asparagaceae
- Subfamily: Scilloideae
- Genus: Lachenalia
- Species: L. ensifolia

Binomial name
- Lachenalia ensifolia (Thunb.) J.C.Manning & Goldblatt

Synonyms
- List: Agapanthus ensifolius (Thunb.) Willd.; Mauhlia ensifolia Thunb.; Massonia ensifolia (Thunb.) Ker Gawl.; Polyxena ensifolia (Thunb.) Schönland

Species of flowering plant

Lachenalia ensifolia is a species of flowering plant in the genus Lachenalia, native to the Cape Provinces of South Africa. Its nominate subspecies Lachenalia ensifolia subsp. ensifolia has gained the Royal Horticultural Society's Award of Garden Merit.

== Subspecies ==
The following subspecies are currently accepted:

- Lachenalia ensifolia subsp. ensifolia
- Lachenalia ensifolia subsp. maughanii (W.F.Barker) G.D.Duncan
