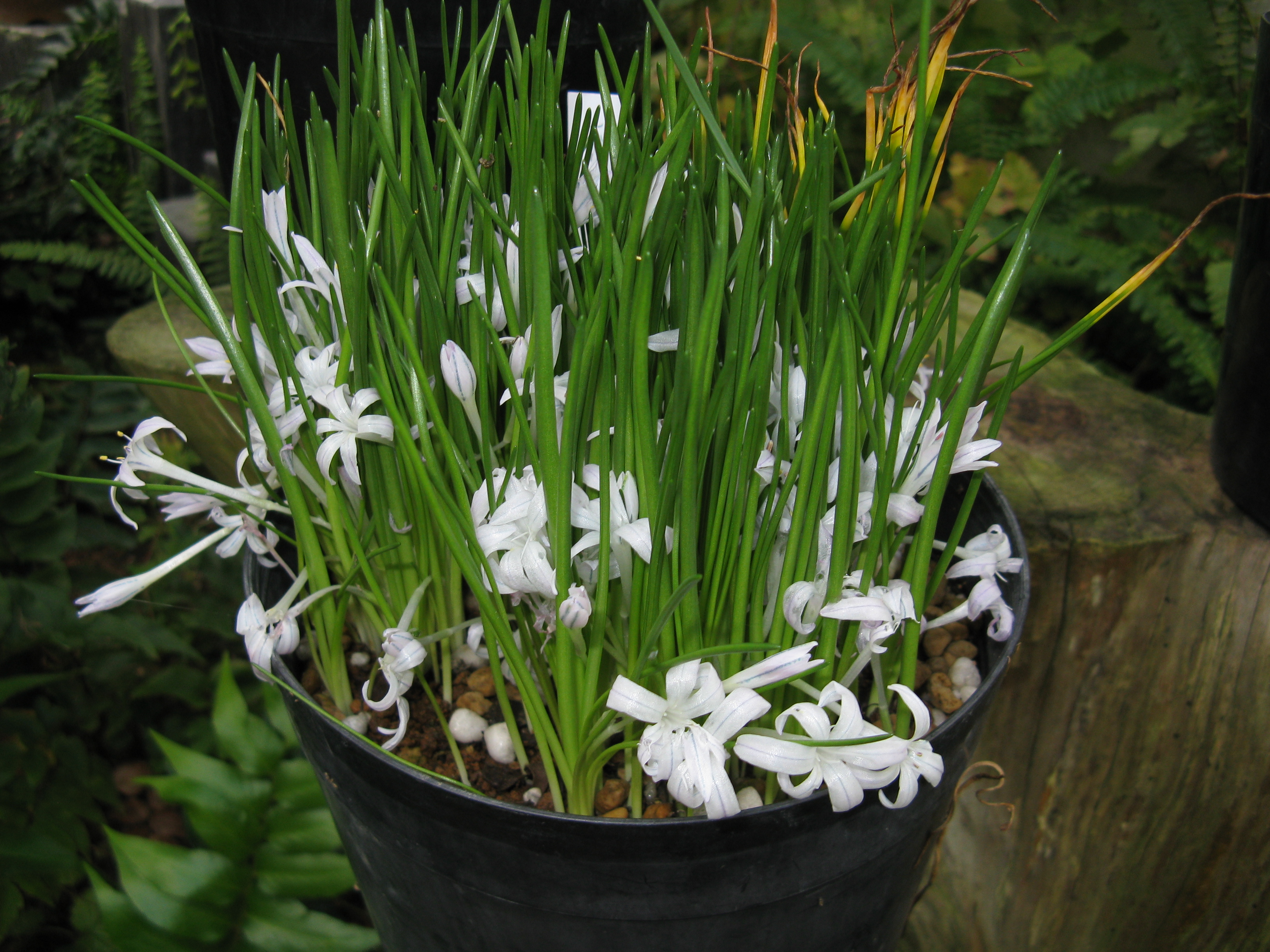

Scientific classification
- Kingdom: Plantae
- Clade: Embryophytes
- Clade: Tracheophytes
- Clade: Angiosperms
- Clade: Monocots
- Order: Asparagales
- Family: Asparagaceae
- Subfamily: Scilloideae
- Genus: Lachenalia
- Species: L. longituba

Binomial name
- Lachenalia longituba (A.M.van der Merwe) J.C.Manning & Goldblatt

Synonyms
- Polyxena longituba A.M.van der Merwe

= Lachenalia longituba =

Species of flowering plant

Lachenalia longituba is a species of flowering plant in the genus Lachenalia, native to the Roggeveld plateau of South Africa. It has gained the Royal Horticultural Society's Award of Garden Merit.
