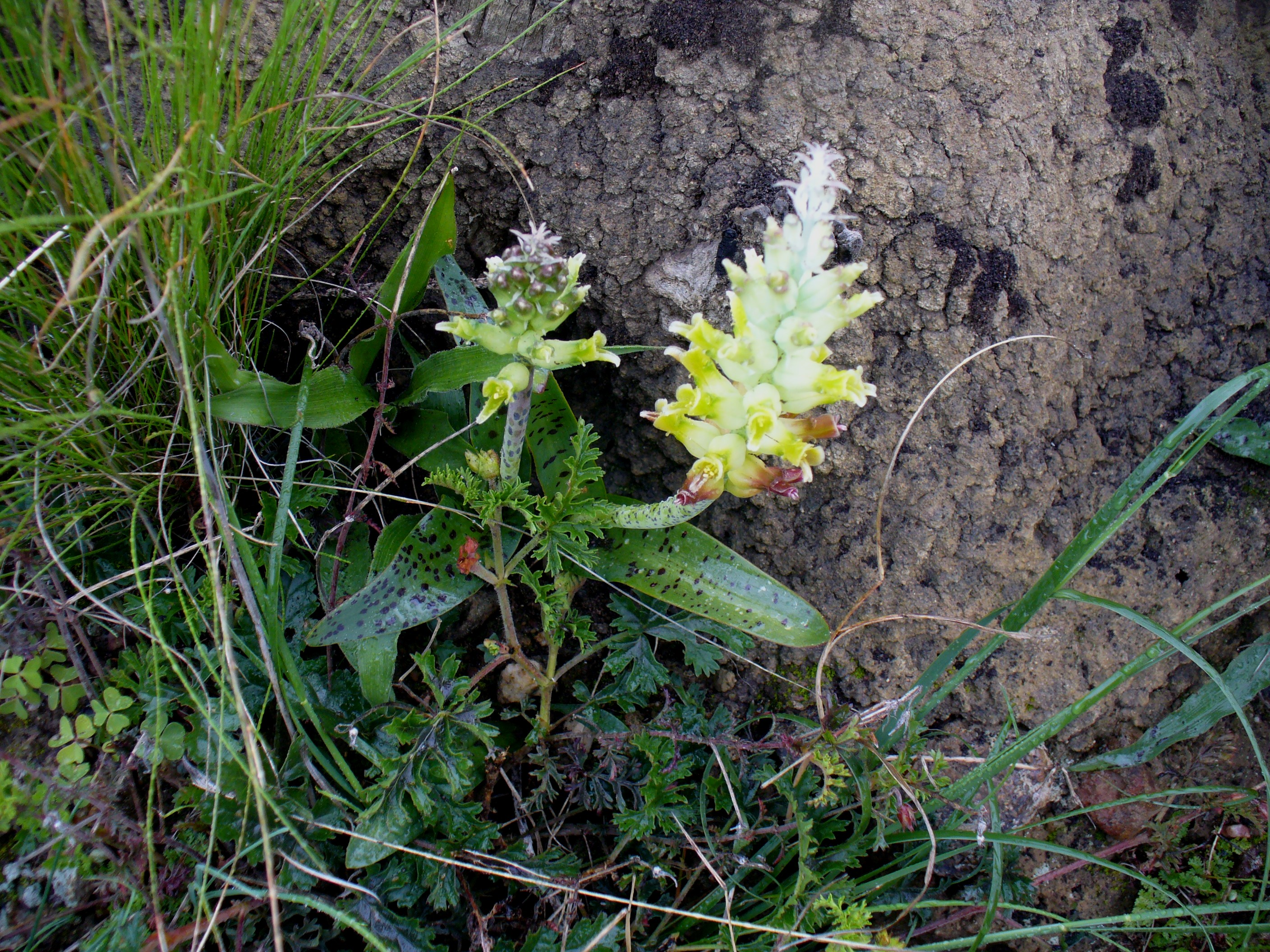

Scientific classification
- Kingdom: Plantae
- Clade: Embryophytes
- Clade: Tracheophytes
- Clade: Angiosperms
- Clade: Monocots
- Order: Asparagales
- Family: Asparagaceae
- Subfamily: Scilloideae
- Genus: Lachenalia
- Species: L. orchioides

Binomial name
- Lachenalia orchioides (L.) Aiton

Synonyms
- List: Hyacinthus orchioides L.; Muscari orchioides (L.) Mill.; Orchiops orchioides (L.) Salisb.; Phormium orchioides (L.) Thunb.; Scilla blanda Salisb.

= Lachenalia orchioides =

Species of flowering plant

Lachenalia orchioides, the orchid‑like Cape cowslip, is a species of flowering plant in the genus Lachenalia, native to the Cape Provinces of South Africa. It has gained the Royal Horticultural Society's Award of Garden Merit.

== Subspecies ==
The following subspecies are currently accepted:

- Lachenalia orchioides subsp. glaucina (Jacq.) G.D.Duncan
- Lachenalia orchioides subsp. orchioides
- Lachenalia orchioides subsp. parviflora (W.F.Barker) G.D.Duncan
