= Carl Friedrich Hagenbach =

Swiss physician and botanist (1771–1849)

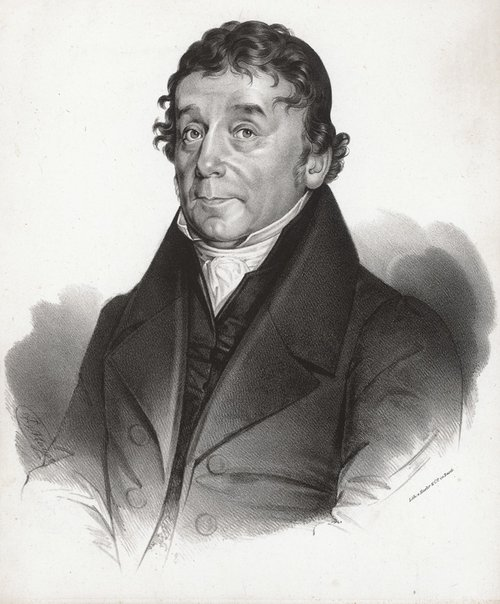

Carl Friedrich Hagenbach (July 2, 1771 – November 20, 1849) was a Swiss medical doctor and botanist. He served as a professor of botany and anatomy at the medical faculty of Basel (1798–1818). After his retirement he produced a flora of the Basel region in two volumes of his Tentamen Florae basilieensis (1821–1834).

== Biography ==
Hagenbach was born on July 2, 1771, to a well-known Basel family with origins in Mulhouse in Alsace. His parents were the merchant Johann Rudolf Hagenbach and Katharina Margaretha Kaiser from Barr, Alsace. Even as young man he was a member of the Helvetic Society where he wrote a poem Der Freye Schweizer (1790) showing a liberal leaning. He studied medicine in Strasbourg, Erlangen and Göttingen and received a doctorate in 1795 with a thesis on respiration in plants and animals. He then began a medical practice in Basel. Along with Werner de Lachenal he made trips into the country to collect plants. He married Sara Dorothea Freyburger, daughter of a surgeon, in 1798 and they had six children. He became professor of anatomy in 1798 at the University of Basel, replacing Werner de Lachenal. De Lachenal had also been in charge of the botanical garden and after his death, Hagenbach was in charge of that as well. The garden was later placed under the care of the gardener Johann Michael Zeiher. His botanical classes included excursions every two weeks and he followed the system of Albrecht von Haller which was based on the Linnean sexual system but did not use binomials. In 1808, Hagenbach exchanged his professor's position with Johann Rudolf Burckhardt (1774–1829) for a position in theoretical medicine. This was possibly to reduce the stress he underwent and the migraines he suffered from. He was rector of the university in 1807 and served as a dean seven times. Only two students were awarded doctorates and along with Johann Jakob Stückelberger (1758–1838) he campaigned for shutting down the medical faculty. In 1818, the faculty of medicine was abolished and he resigned and returned to his private medical practice. He also worked with another clinic in Arlesheim with a colleague. He also began to spend more time on botany, this time following a Linnean system. His herbarium collection was extensive, and by the time of his death on November 20, 1849, aged 78, contained 8000 species. He worked on the Tentamen floral Basiliensis, the plants of the Basel region. Christian Nees von Esenbeck named a genus Hagenbachia in his honour while he dedicated his flora to Esenbeck.
