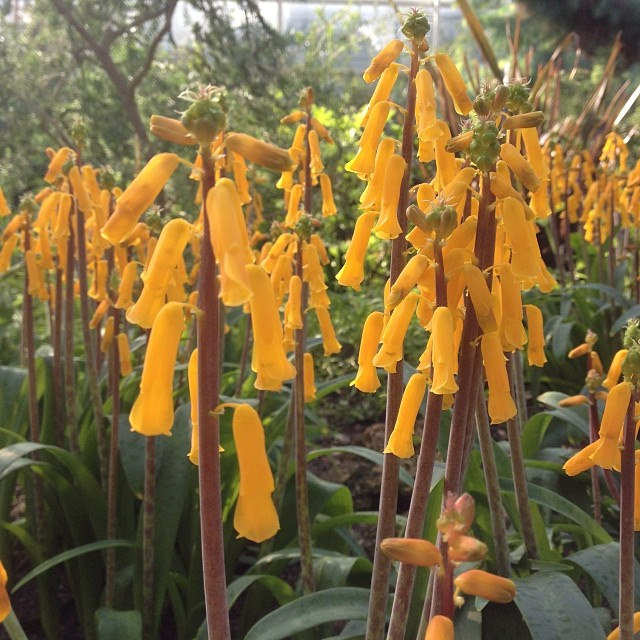
- Lachenalia flava

Scientific classification
- Kingdom: Plantae
- Clade: Tracheophytes
- Clade: Angiosperms
- Clade: Monocots
- Order: Asparagales
- Family: Asparagaceae
- Subfamily: Scilloideae
- Genus: Lachenalia; J.Jacq.

Type species
- Lachenalia aloides

Synonyms
- Dipcadioides Medik.; Polyanthes Jacq.; Coelanthus Willd. ex Schult. & Schult.f. in J.J.Roemer & J.A.Schultes; Triallosia Raf.; Periboea Kunth; Polyxena Kunth; Orchiastrum Lem. 1855, illegitimate homonym, not Ség. 1754; Scillopsis Lem.; Chloriza Salisb.; Himas Salisb.; Manlilia Salisb.; Monoestes Salisb.; Orchiops Salisb.; Platyestes Salisb.; Sugillaria Salisb.; Brachyscypha Baker

= Lachenalia =

Genus of flowering plants

Lachenalia is a genus of bulbous perennial plants in the family Asparagaceae, subfamily Scilloideae, which are usually found in Namibia and South Africa. Most of them have a dormancy period, but new roots will always grow every year.

Lachenalia is named after the Swiss botanist Werner de Lachenal (1736-1800). Species are sometimes known as Cape cowslip, though they are not even somewhat related to the true cowslip Primula veris.

== Species ==
As of December 2022, the Plants of the World Online accepted 136 species:

- Lachenalia alba W.F.Barker ex G.D.Duncan
- Lachenalia algoensis Schönland
- Lachenalia aloides (L.f.) Engl.
- Lachenalia ameliae W.F.Barker
- Lachenalia angelica W.F.Barker
- Lachenalia anguinea Sweet
- Lachenalia arbuthnotiae W.F.Barker
- Lachenalia attenuata W.F.Barker ex G.D.Duncan
- Lachenalia aurioliae G.D.Duncan
- Lachenalia bachmannii Baker
- Lachenalia barkeriana U.Müll.-Doblies
- Lachenalia bolusii W.F.Barker
- Lachenalia bowkeri Baker
- Lachenalia buchubergensis Dinter
- Lachenalia bulbifera (Cirillo) Engl.
- Lachenalia campanulata Baker
- Lachenalia capensis W.F.Barker
- Lachenalia carnosa Baker
- Lachenalia cernua G.D.Duncan
- Lachenalia comptonii W.F.Barker
- Lachenalia concordiana Schltr. ex W.F.Barker
- Lachenalia congesta W.F.Barker
- Lachenalia contaminata Aiton
- Lachenalia convallarioides Baker
- Lachenalia corymbosa (L.) J.C.Manning & Goldblatt
- Lachenalia dasybotrya Diels
- Lachenalia dehoopensis W.F.Barker
- Lachenalia doleritica G.D.Duncan
- Lachenalia duncanii W.F.Barker
- Lachenalia elegans W.F.Barker
- Lachenalia ensifolia (Thunb.) J.C.Manning & Goldblatt
- Lachenalia fistulosa Baker
- Lachenalia flava Andrews
- Lachenalia framesii W.F.Barker
- Lachenalia giessii W.F.Barker
- Lachenalia glaucophylla W.F.Barker
- Lachenalia haarlemensis Fourc.
- Lachenalia hirta (Thunb.) Thunb.
- Lachenalia inconspicua G.D.Duncan
- Lachenalia isopetala Jacq.
- Lachenalia juncifolia Baker
- Lachenalia karooica W.F.Barker ex G.D.Duncan
- Lachenalia klinghardtiana Dinter
- Lachenalia kliprandensis W.F.Barker
- Lachenalia lactosa G.D.Duncan
- Lachenalia latimerae W.F.Barker
- Lachenalia leipoldtii G.D.Duncan
- Lachenalia leomontana W.F.Barker
- Lachenalia liliiflora Jacq.
- Lachenalia longibracteata E.Phillips
- Lachenalia longituba (A.M.van der Merwe) J.C.Manning & Goldblatt
- Lachenalia lutea G.D.Duncan
- Lachenalia luteola Jacq.
- Lachenalia lutzeyeri G.D.Duncan
- Lachenalia macgregoriorum W.F.Barker
- Lachenalia margaretae W.F.Barker
- Lachenalia marginata W.F.Barker
- Lachenalia marlothii W.F.Barker ex G.D.Duncan
- Lachenalia martiniae W.F.Barker
- Lachenalia mathewsii W.F.Barker
- Lachenalia maughanii (W.F.Barker) J.C.Manning & Goldblatt
- Lachenalia maximiliani Schltr. ex W.F.Barker
- Lachenalia mediana Jacq.
- Lachenalia minima W.F.Barker
- Lachenalia moniliformis W.F.Barker
- Lachenalia montana Schltr. ex W.F.Barker
- Lachenalia multifolia W.F.Barker
- Lachenalia mutabilis Lodd. ex Sweet
- Lachenalia namaquensis W.F.Barker
- Lachenalia namibiensis W.F.Barker
- Lachenalia nardousbergensis G.D.Duncan
- Lachenalia neilii W.F.Barker ex G.D.Duncan
- Lachenalia nervosa Ker Gawl.
- Lachenalia nutans G.D.Duncan
- Lachenalia obscura Schltr. ex G.D.Duncan
- Lachenalia orchioides (L.) Aiton
- Lachenalia orthopetala Jacq.
- Lachenalia pallida Aiton
- Lachenalia patula Jacq.
- Lachenalia paucifolia (W.F.Barker) J.C.Manning & Goldblatt
- Lachenalia pearsonii (R.Glover) W.F.Barker
- Lachenalia peersii Marloth ex W.F.Barker
- Lachenalia perryae G.D.Duncan
- Lachenalia physocaulos W.F.Barker
- Lachenalia polyphylla Baker
- Lachenalia polypodantha Schltr. ex W.F.Barker
- Lachenalia punctata Jacq.
- Lachenalia purpureocaerulea Jacq.
- Lachenalia pusilla Jacq.
- Lachenalia quadricolor Jacq.
- Lachenalia reflexa Thunb.
- Lachenalia rosea Andrews
- Lachenalia salteri W.F.Barker
- Lachenalia sargeantii W.F.Barker
- Lachenalia schelpei W.F.Barker
- Lachenalia schlechteri Baker
- Lachenalia sessiliflora Andrews
- Lachenalia splendida Diels
- Lachenalia stayneri W.F.Barker
- Lachenalia thomasiae W.F.Barker ex G.D.Duncan
- Lachenalia trichophylla Baker
- Lachenalia undulata Masson ex Baker
- Lachenalia unifolia Jacq.
- Lachenalia valeriae G.D.Duncan
- Lachenalia variegata W.F.Barker
- Lachenalia ventricosa Schltr. ex W.F.Barker
- Lachenalia verticillata W.F.Barker
- Lachenalia violacea Jacq.
- Lachenalia viridiflora W.F.Barker
- Lachenalia whitehillensis W.F.Barker
- Lachenalia wrightii Baker
- Lachenalia xerophila Schltr. ex G.D.Duncan
- Lachenalia youngii Baker in W.H.Harvey & auct. suc. (eds.)
- Lachenalia zebrina W.F.Barker
- Lachenalia zeyheri Baker

In addition, Lachenalia nordenstamii W.F.Barker was listed as "threatened" in the 2006 IUCN Red List, but as of December 2012 the name was not accepted by the World Checklist of Selected Plant Families.

== Cultivation ==
Several species are cultivated as garden plants. The following have gained the Royal Horticultural Society's Award of Garden Merit.

- Lachenalia 'Rupert'
- Lachenalia bulbifera 'George'
- Lachenalia contaminata
- Lachenalia corymbosa
- Lachenalia flava
- Lachenalia pustulata
- Lachenalia quadricolor
- Lachenalia vanzyliae
- Lachenalia viridiflora

== Gallery ==
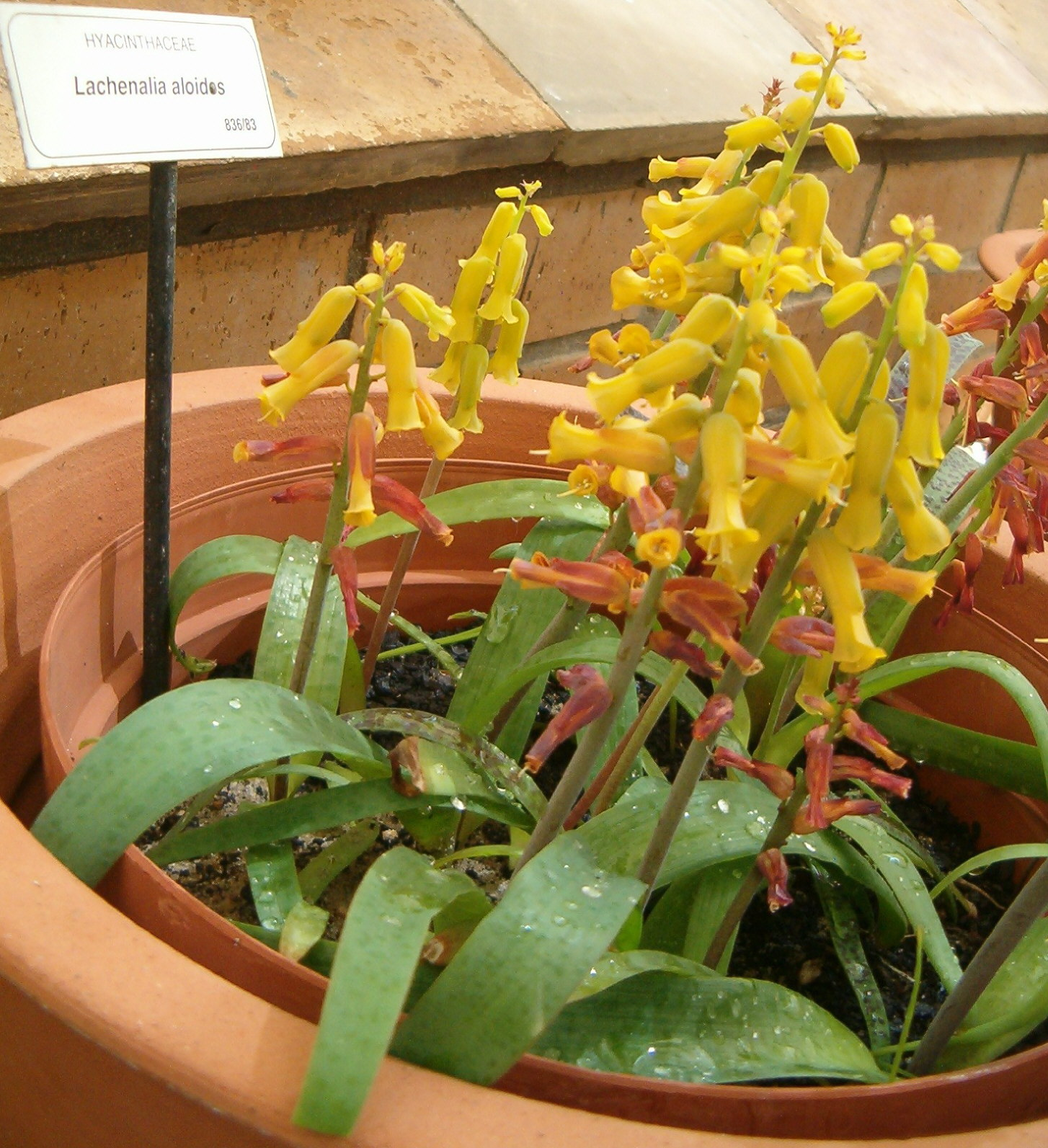
Lachenalia aloides, Kirstenbosch Botanical Garden

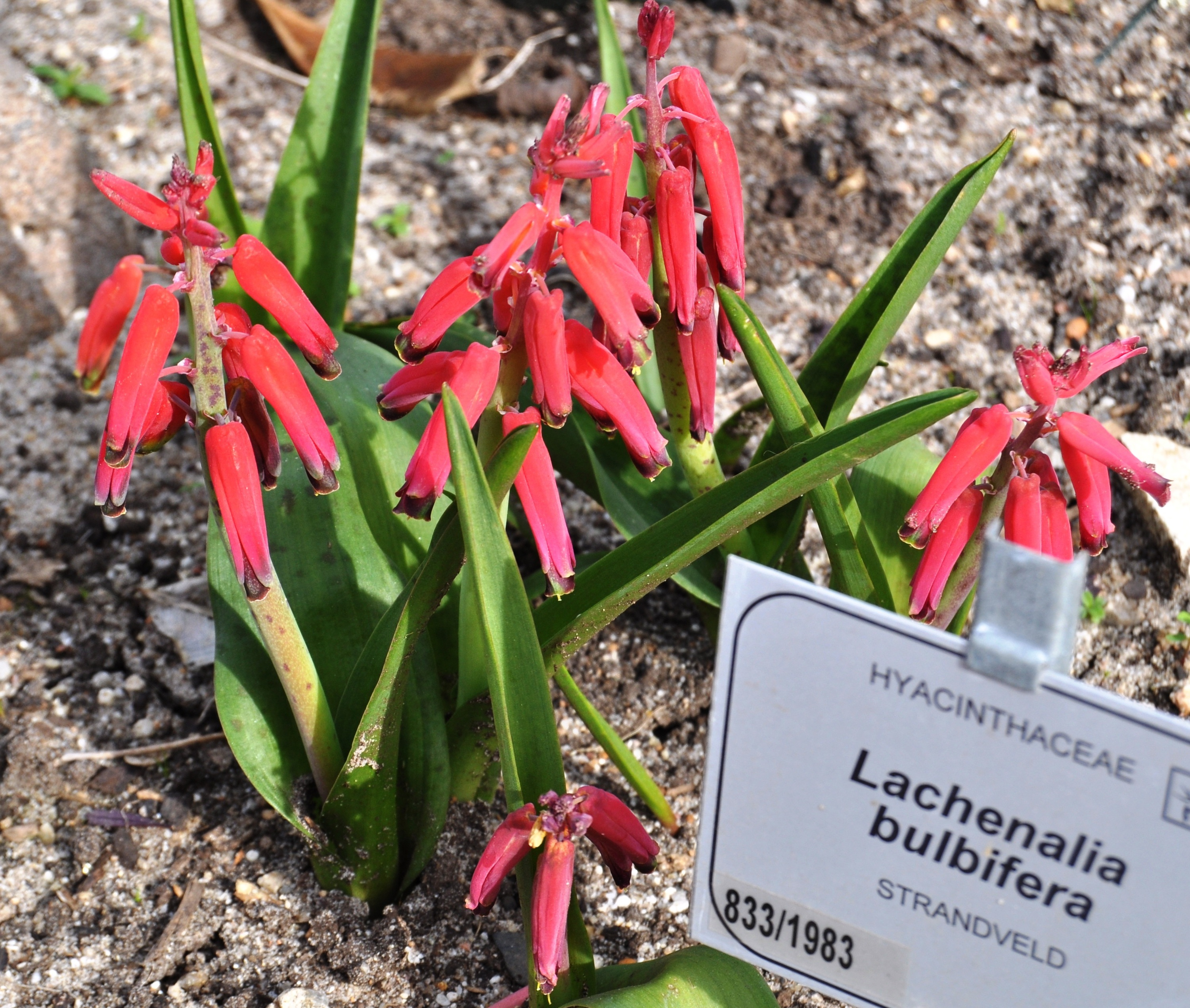
Lachenalia bulbifera, Kirstenbosch Botanical Garden

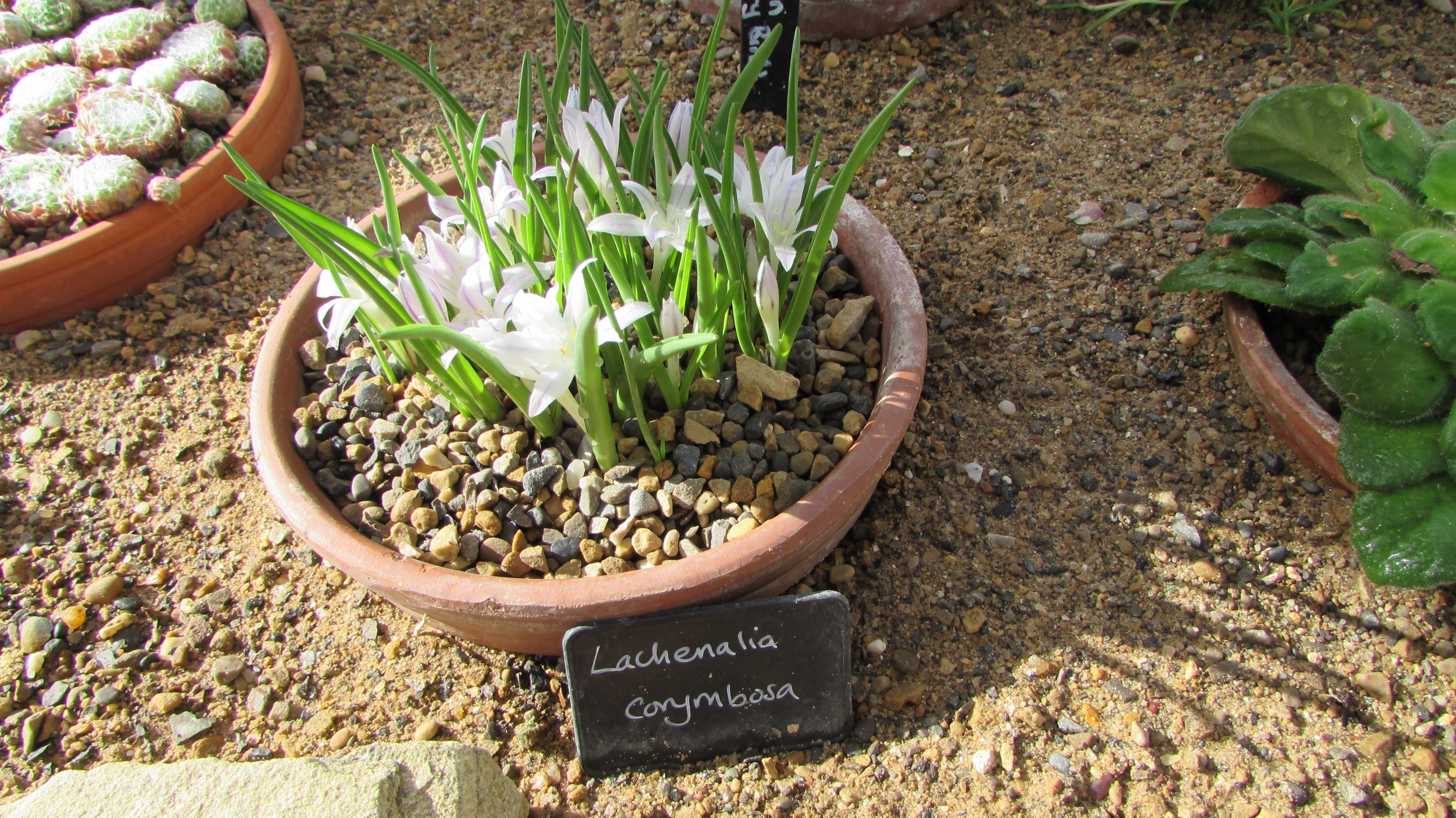
Lachenalia corymbosa, Harlow Carr

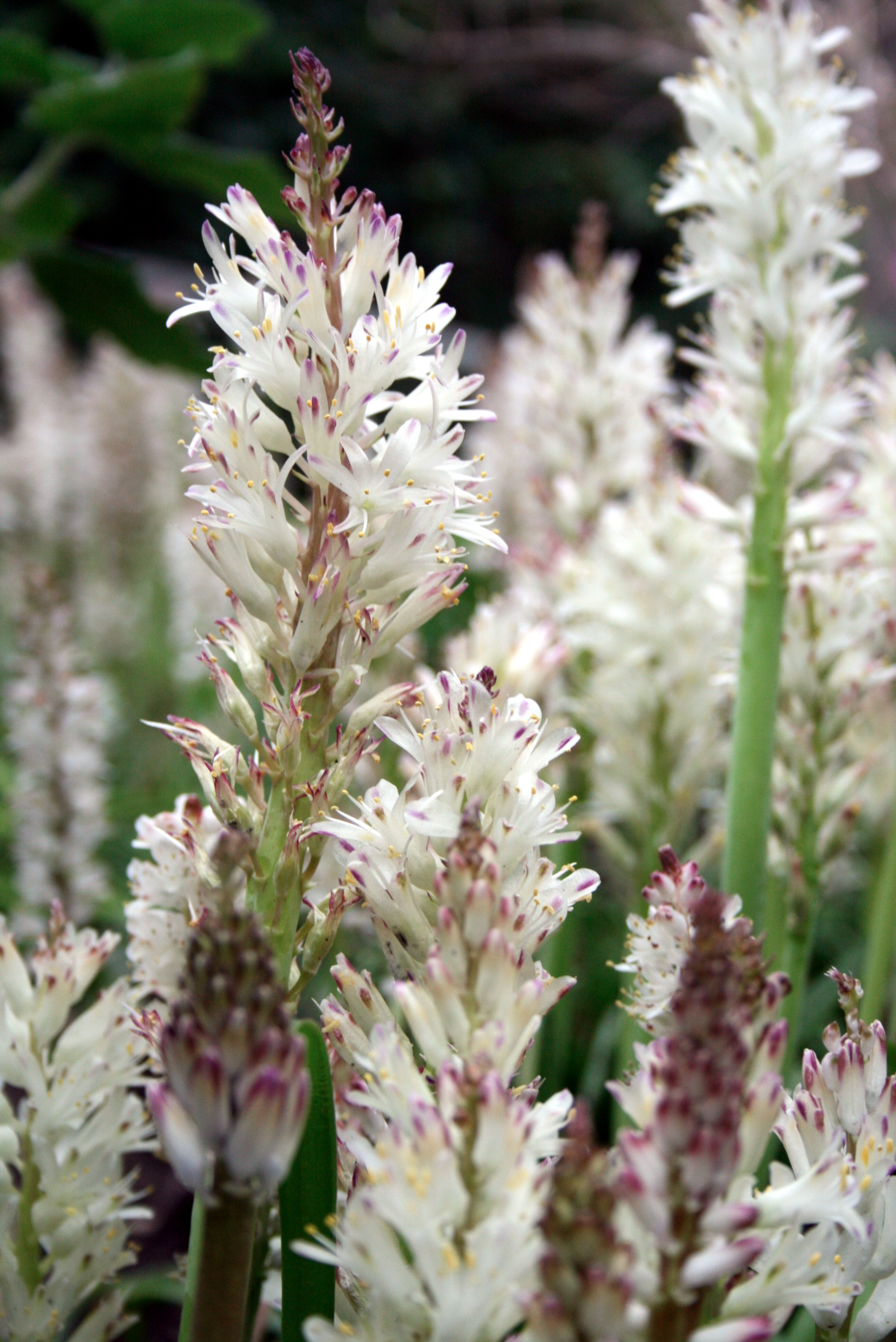
Lachenalia liliflora

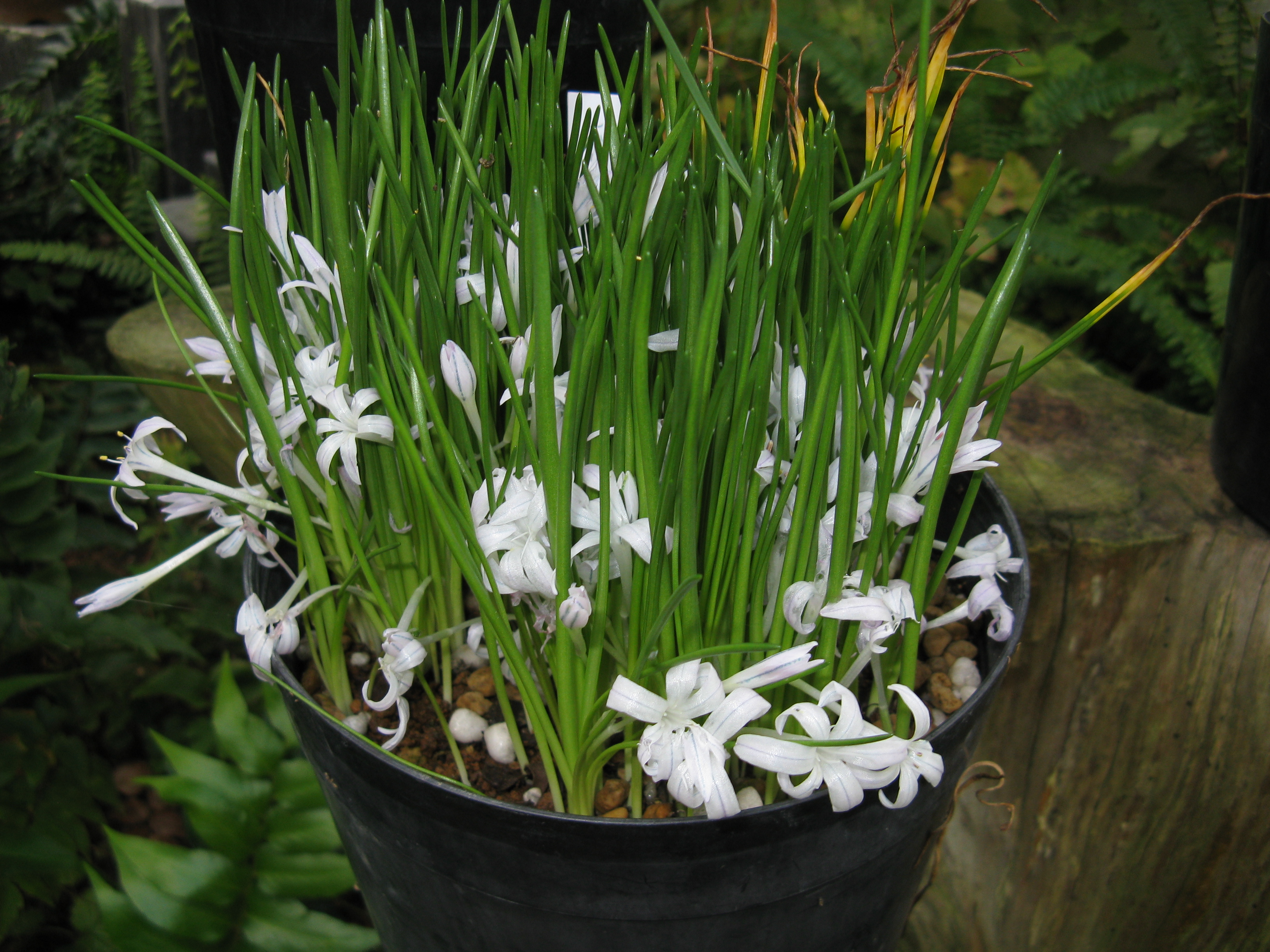
Lachenalia longituba

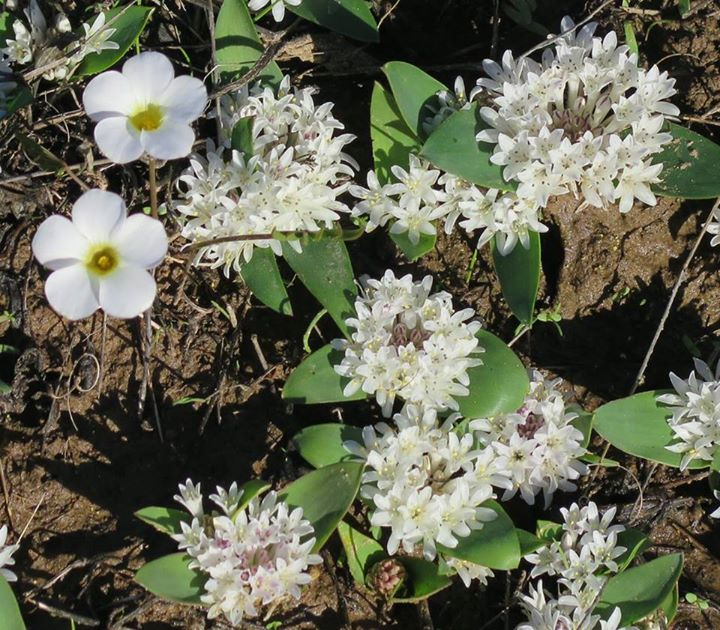
Lachenalia maughanii, Nieuwoudtville, South Africa

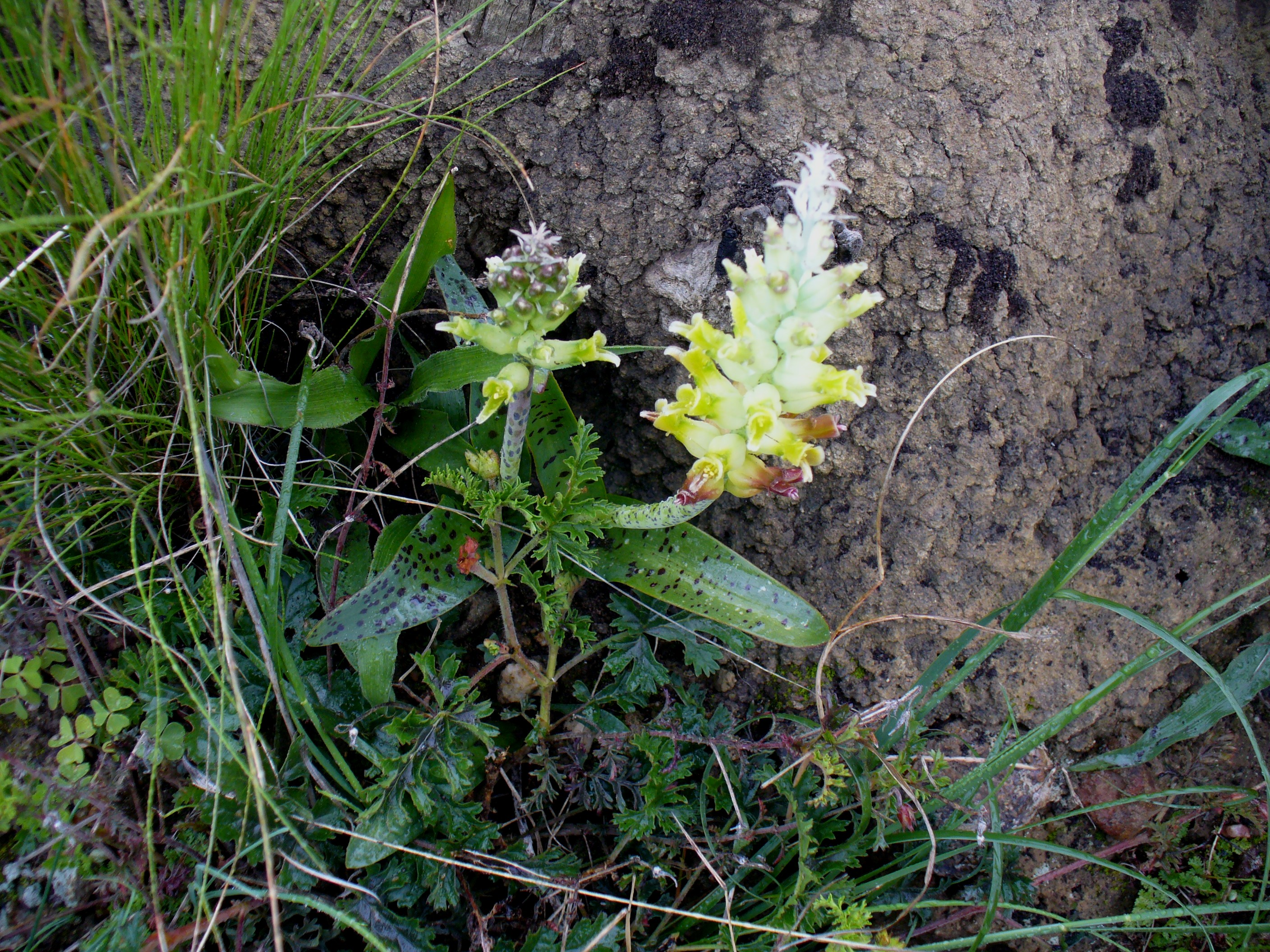
Lachenalia orchioides

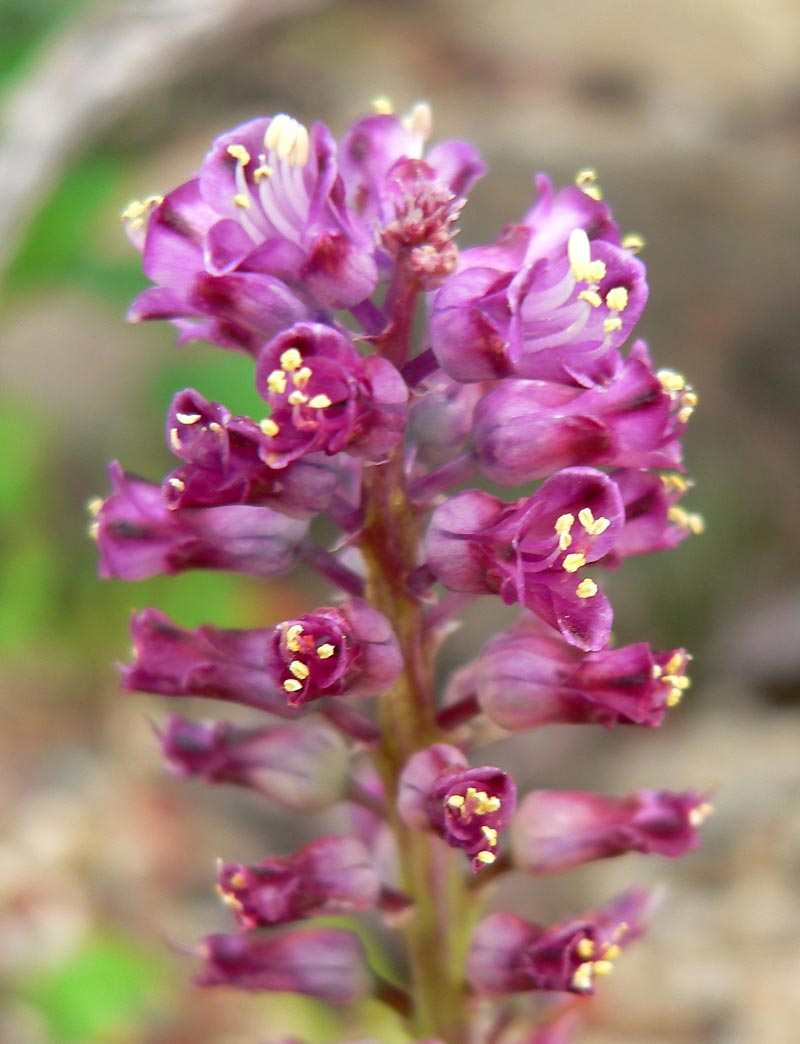
Lachenalia pustulata

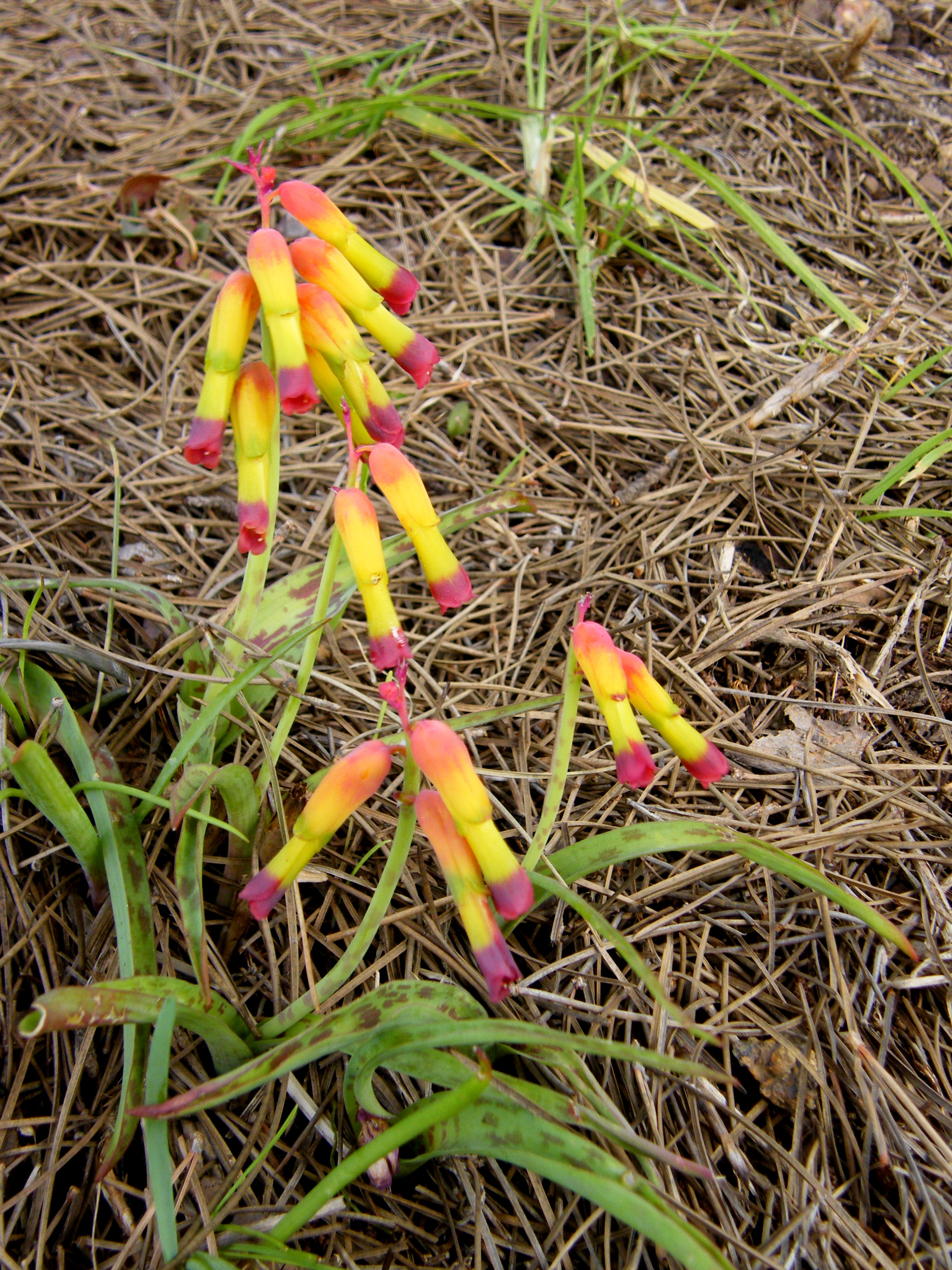
Lachenalia quadricolor

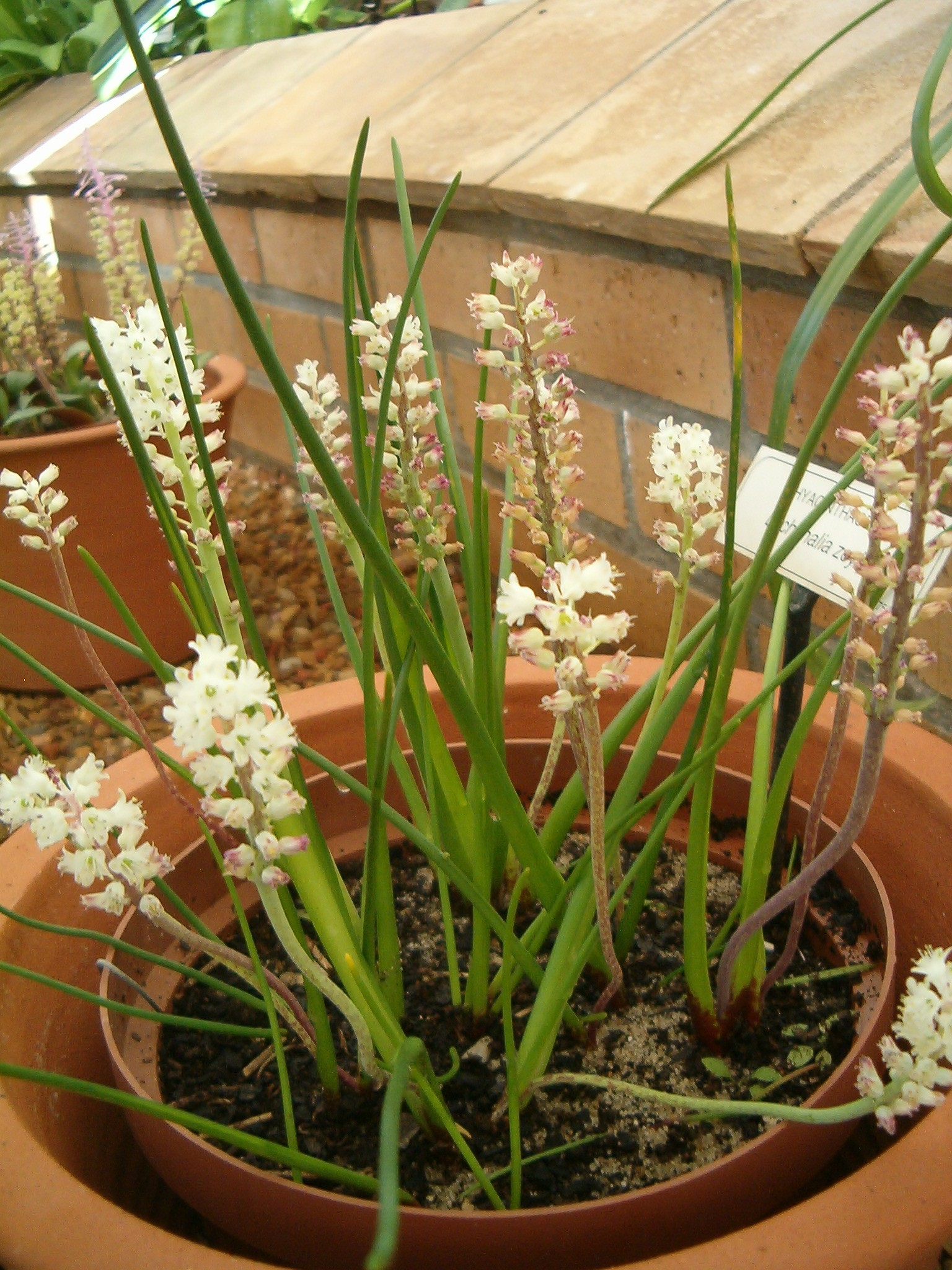
Lachenalia zeyheri, Kirstenbosch Botanical Garden

== Bibliography ==
- Anderson, Neil O., ed. (2007). Flower breeding and genetics: issues, challenges and opportunities for the 21st century. Dordrecht: Springer. ISBN 9781402065699.
- Barker, Winsome F. (April 1987). "Five more new species of Lachenalia (Liliaceae — Hyacinthoideae) four from the Cape Province and one from southern South West Africa/Namibia". South African Journal of Botany. 53 (2): 166–172. doi:10.1016/S0254-6299(16)31453-3.
- Duncan, G. D.; Edwards, T. J. (15 December 2006). "Three new species of Lachenalia (Hyacinthaceae: Massonieae) from Western and Northern Cape, South Africa". Bothalia. 36 (2): 147–155. doi:10.4102/abc.v36i2.353.
- Duncan, Graham; Helme, Nick A. (4 December 2014). "Lachenalia arenicola (Asparagaceae: Scilloideae), a new species from western South Africa" (PDF). Phytotaxa. 186 (5): 297–300. doi:10.11646/phytotaxa.186.5.8.
- Dressler, S.; Schmidt, M. & Zizka, G. (2014). "Lachenalia". African plants – a Photo Guide. Frankfurt/Main: Forschungsinstitut Senckenberg.
- Duncan, G. (15 December 1998). "Five new species of Lachenalia (Hyacinthaceae) from arid areas of Namibia and South Africa". Bothalia. 28 (2): 131–139. doi:10.4102/abc.v28i2.630.
