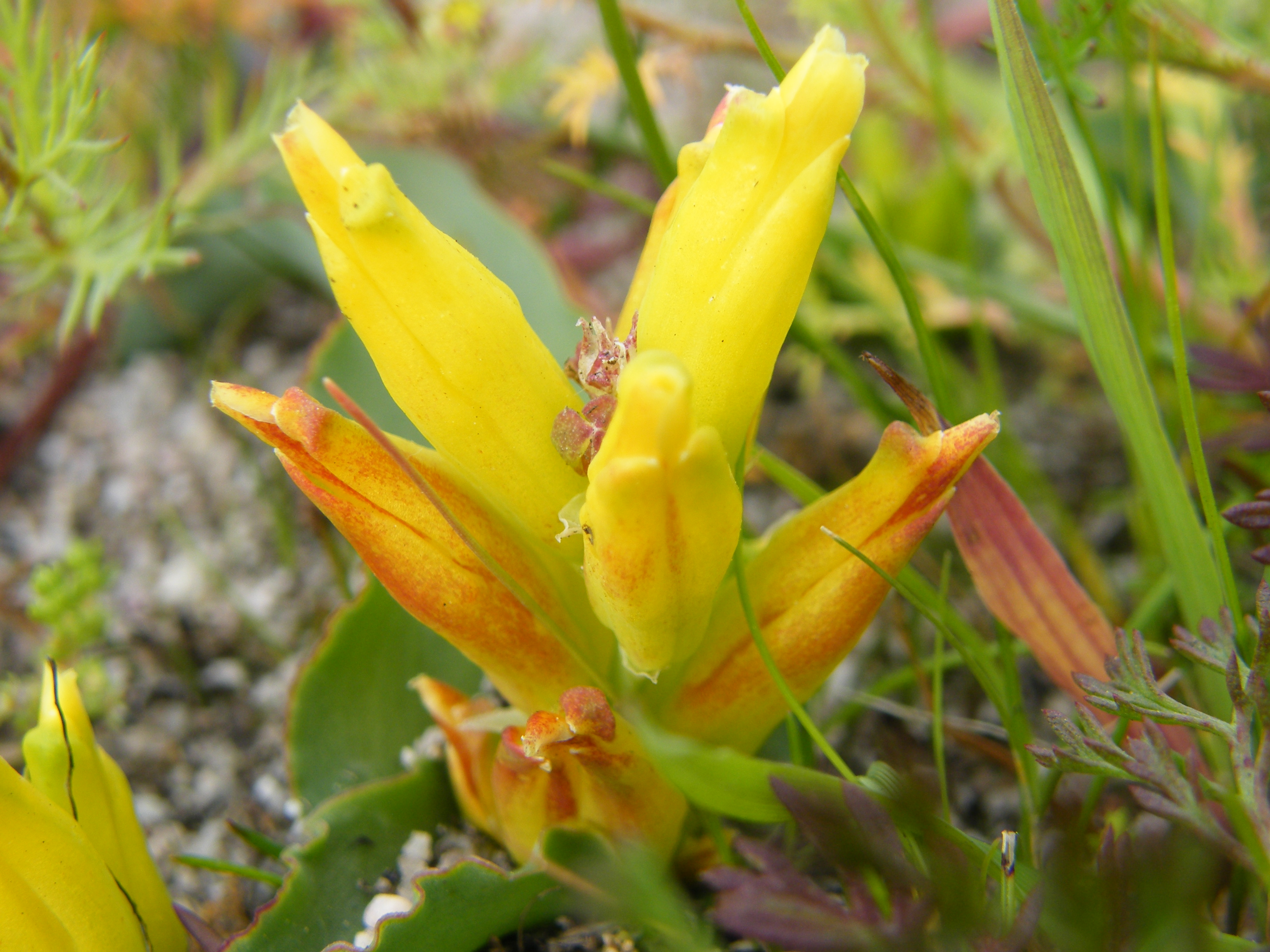

Scientific classification
- Kingdom: Plantae
- Clade: Tracheophytes
- Clade: Angiosperms
- Clade: Monocots
- Order: Asparagales
- Family: Asparagaceae
- Subfamily: Scilloideae
- Genus: Lachenalia
- Species: L. reflexa

Binomial name
- Lachenalia reflexa Thunb.

= Lachenalia reflexa =

Species of flowering plant

Lachenalia reflexa (commonly known as yellow soldier) is species of the genus Lachenalia endemic to lowland areas near Cape Town, South Africa.

== South African threatened species ==
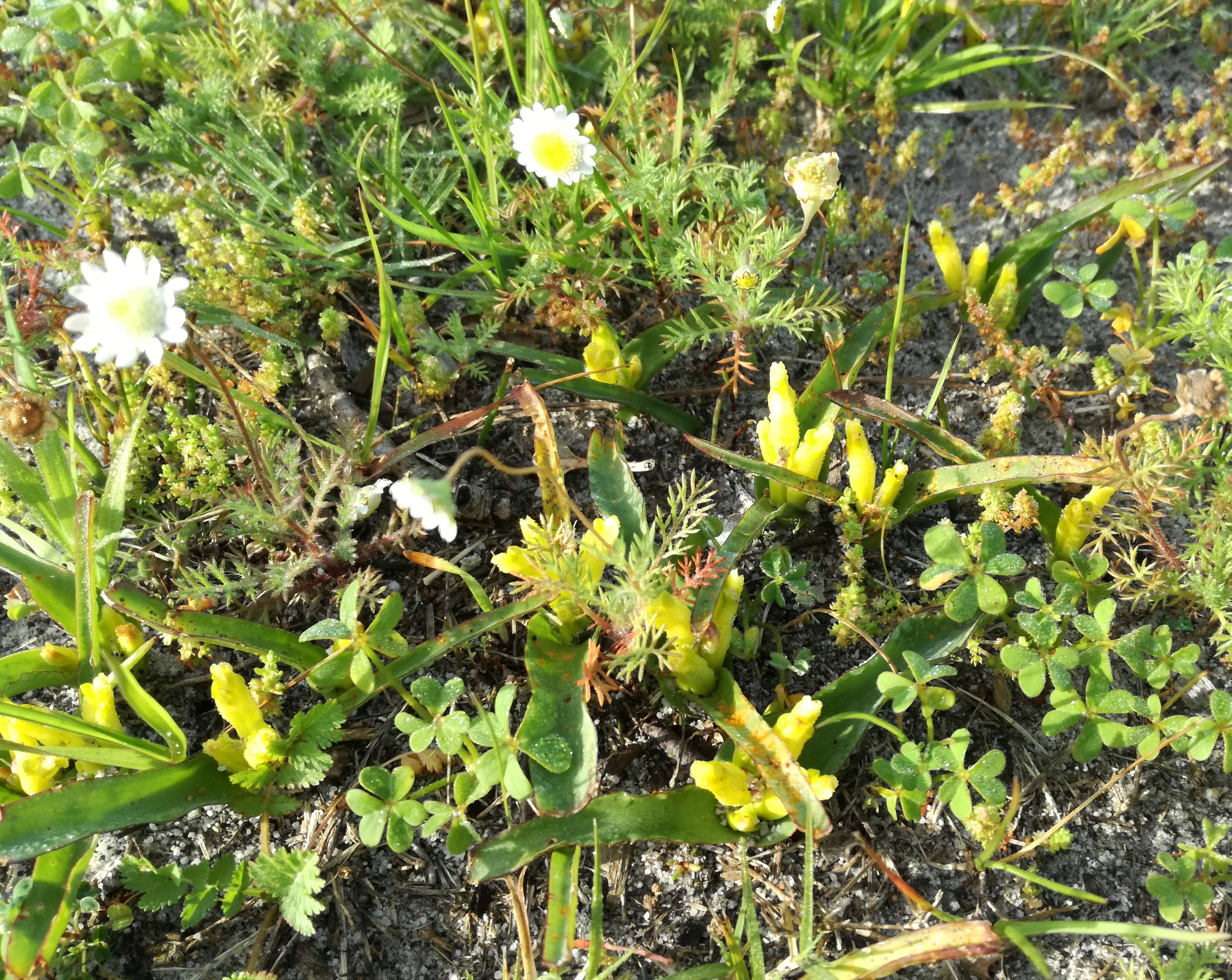
Lachenalia reflexa growing in its natural habitat, in Kenwyn Nature Park, Cape Town.

=== Natural distribution ===
The species is rare and declining in its native South Africa. It is naturally restricted to lowland, winter-rainfall areas in Cape Town and also up to Malmesbury, just to the north. It is therefore entirely endemic to the Western Cape Province.

=== Habitat ===
Its natural habitat is lowland coastal sand Fynbos as well as patches of Renosterveld and Strandveld. Much of its habitat is inundated during the winter, but during the dry summers, the species becomes dormant.

=== Threats and conservation ===
The overwhelming majority of the natural habitat of Lachenalia reflexa has been destroyed. The species is currently restricted to less than 10 populations, in a relatively small area. It is therefore categorised as a vulnerable species in its native South Africa. It is still declining, because of competition from invasive alien plants, but mainly due to the destruction of many of the remaining parts of its habitat.

=== Seed dispersal ===
Reaching approximately 10 cm (4") when in flower, this species spreads through two main methods, both of which lend to its common name.

The first of these two methods is simply dropping the seeds of the plant up to 20 cm (8") away from the base of the original plant. Given that each flower produces between 40 and 60 seeds, and that each plant can produce up to ten flowers, propagation may be rapid. Yellow soldier can grow in densities of up to 400 plants per square metre, with each plant capable of reaching full reproductive potential. This density prevents native plants from reclaiming lost ground.

The second method of seed dispersal is by clinging to the feet of native animals and humans. The small, black seeds become stuck in between the toes of animals and humans or in the tread of shoes. When the seed is eventually jolted out of its position, it falls to the ground and begins to germinate. Within two years it will have reproduced enough times to reach optimal density in a square metre, and gains another square metre or two every year from then on, with a possibly exponential growth rate.

=== Danger as an introduced weed ===
In Australia, the species is an introduced weed. Yellow soldier is regarded as a potential threat to natural flora and fauna, and has been placed on the national weed alert program, one of only 28 weeds to be recognised as extremely dangerous to natural bushland. It is already a serious weed in a number of conservation reserves around Perth, Western Australia.

=== Control methods ===
The reason this weed is so hard to control is its ability to reproduce in such great numbers, and the damage it does when removed. Seeds of the yellow soldier are next to impossible to see in the soil or on the shoes of removalists, and germinate easily, negating the effect of the removal program. Removal by hand is labour-intensive, with only 4m² (42 square feet) being removed in a 6-hour period (Weed Management Guide). The ability to grow back from its root system means that the entire plant must be removed from the ground, allowing other weeds to germinate.

Controlled burning is also ineffective; it actually increases the number of yellow soldiers in the area. In studies conducted, it has been found that fire increases the germination rate of yellow soldier seeds, and does not kill off any of the plants, due to its ability to grow back from its root system. The yellow soldier also germinates faster after a fire than native plants, allowing it complete dominance over a larger area than before the fire.

The only effective way to remove yellow soldier is through spot-spraying of herbicides. Once again, however, the ability to quickly germinate from seed means that multiple courses of spraying must be done in order to eliminate yellow soldier, and allow native species the chance to reclaim the soil. The herbicide developed to kill only yellow soldier is expensive and therefore can usually only be done through government funding. This prevents most environment and bush care groups from eliminating the species, and thus allowing it the chance to spread further.
