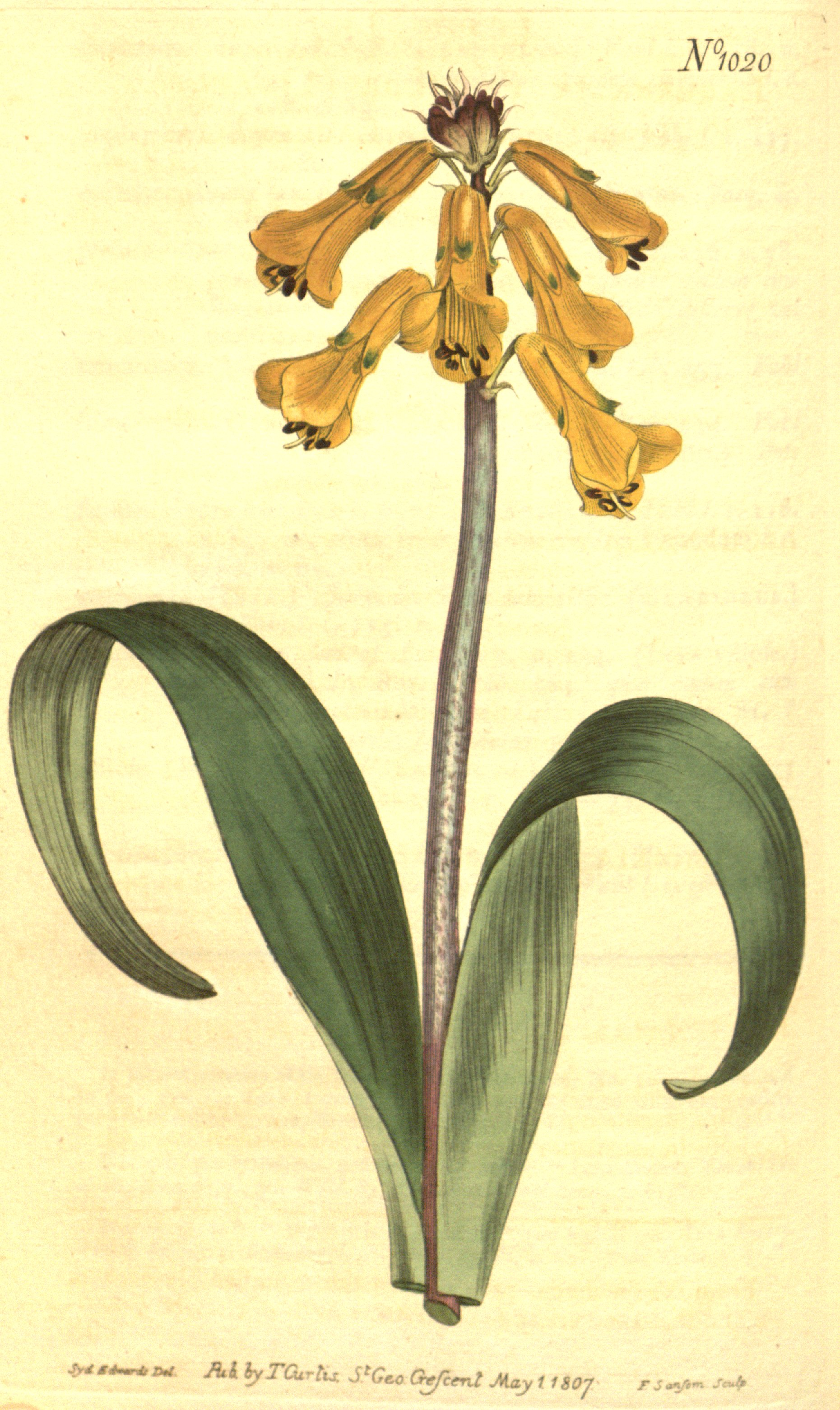
- L. aloides var. aloides (Curtis's Botanical Magazine)

Scientific classification
- Kingdom: Plantae
- Clade: Tracheophytes
- Clade: Angiosperms
- Clade: Monocots
- Order: Asparagales
- Family: Asparagaceae
- Subfamily: Scilloideae
- Genus: Lachenalia
- Species: L. aloides

Binomial name
- Lachenalia aloides (L.f.) Engl.

= Lachenalia aloides =

Species of flowering plant

Lachenalia aloides (opal flower) is a species of flowering plant in the family Asparagaceae, native to the Western Cape of South Africa. It is a bulbous perennial growing to 15–28 cm (6–11 in) tall by 5 cm (2 in) broad, with strap-shaped spotted leaves and fleshy stems bearing pendent tubular yellow flowers, red at the tips, in winter and spring. The Latin aloides literally means "aloe-like"; though L. aloides, despite its similarity, does not belong to the same family of plants as aloes.

Numerous cultivars have been bred for garden use. They require a sheltered, frost-free position or under glass. The following have gained the Royal Horticultural Society's Award of Garden Merit:

- L. aloides var. aurea
- L. aloides var. quadricolor
