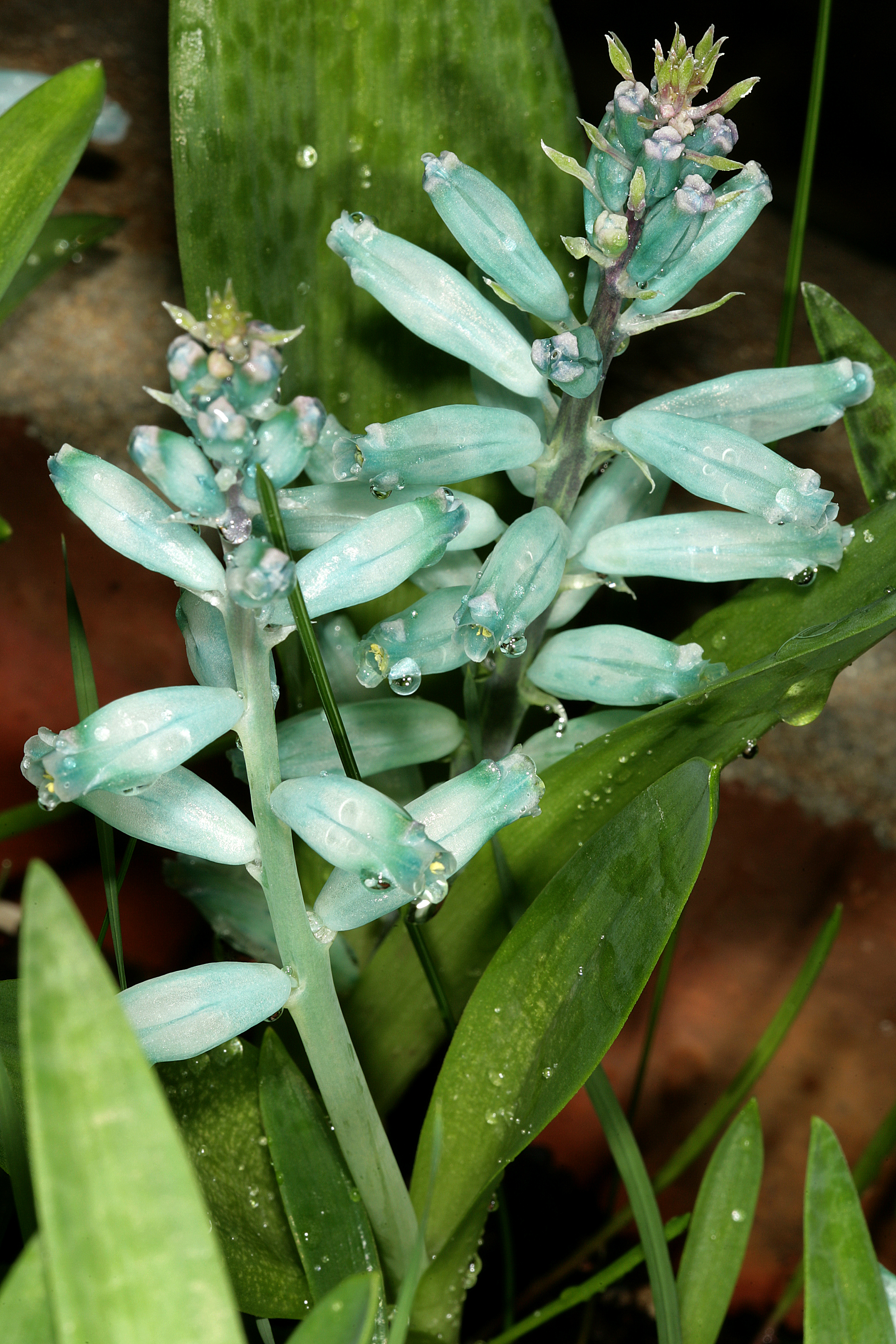

Conservation status
- Endangered (IUCN 3.1)

Scientific classification
- Kingdom: Plantae
- Clade: Tracheophytes
- Clade: Angiosperms
- Clade: Monocots
- Order: Asparagales
- Family: Asparagaceae
- Subfamily: Scilloideae
- Genus: Lachenalia
- Species: L. viridiflora

Binomial name
- Lachenalia viridiflora W.F.Barker

= Lachenalia viridiflora =

Species of flowering plant

Lachenalia viridiflora, commonly known as the green-flowered Cape cowslip or turquoise hyacinth, is a species of flowering plant in the asparagus family native to the southwest Cape Provinces of South Africa. It was discovered in the 1960s, and first described in 1972 by Winsome Fanny Barker.

== Description ==
Lachenalia viridiflora is a bulbous species of perennial plant that grows 8-20cm tall. Each plant grows two leaves, which may be plain or with dark spots. In the winter, plants produce racemes of tubular turquoise flowers with white tips; it is for this reason that Barker chose the specific epithet 'viridiflora', which is Latin for green-flowered. The flowers are pollinated by the lesser double-collared sunbird.

== Habitat and distribution ==
Lachenalia viridiflora is endemic to the Vrendenburg Peninsula, where there are two extant sub-populations. It grows in full sun on granite outcrops in sandy soil which becomes waterlogged in the winter. Lachenalia viridiflora is an endangered species, and is threatened by habitat loss and overgrazing.

== Cultivation ==
Lachenalia viridiflora is cultivated as a garden ornamental, and has gained the Royal Horticultural Society's Award of Garden Merit. Plants can be propagated through somatic embryogenesis, leaf cuttings, and by sowing seeds.
