= Lachenalia unifolia =

- A cultivated banded viooltjie

Scientific classification
- Kingdom: Plantae
- Clade: Tracheophytes
- Clade: Angiosperms
- Clade: Monocots
- Order: Asparagales
- Family: Asparagaceae
- Subfamily: Scilloideae
- Genus: Lachenalia
- Species: L. unifolia

Binomial name
- Lachenalia unifolia Jacq.

Synonyms
- Monoestes unifolia (Jacq.) Salisb.; Scillopsis unifolia (Jacq.) Lem.

South African geophyte

Lachenalia unifolia, the banded viooltjie, is the most common Lachenalia species in the Cape Floristic Region of South Africa.

== Description ==
This bulbous geophyte grows 8–35 cm (3.1–13.8 in) tall. It has one linear leaf, the lower part of which is banded with green and maroon stripes. It is 8–32 cm (3.1–12.6 in) long and clasps the stem at the base. The tuber contains a multi-layered tunic. The outer layers are dark brown and spongy while the inner layers are a translucent white colour.

Flowers are present between August and October. They are pale blue, pink or pale yellow in colour with white tips. They are borne in a raceme, which may have few or many flowers.

The ellipsoid capsule contains glossy black spherical seeds.

== Distribution and habitat ==
This species is endemic to the Northern Cape and Western Cape of South Africa. It is found on deep sandy flats and stony clay slopes between Namaqualand to Bredasdorp.

== Conservation ==
Lachenalia unifolia is the most common Lachenalia species and is considered to be of least concern by the South African National Biodiversity Institute (SANBI). While it is declining due to a combination of habitat loss and alien vegetation, the rate of decline is not currently considered high enough to put this species at risk of extinction.

== Uses ==
This species is valued as an ornamental plant.
