= Lachenalia nordenstamii =

Conservation status
- Least Concern (IUCN 3.1)

Scientific classification
- Kingdom: Plantae
- Clade: Tracheophytes
- Clade: Angiosperms
- Clade: Monocots
- Order: Asparagales
- Family: Asparagaceae
- Subfamily: Scilloideae
- Genus: Lachenalia
- Species: L. nordenstamii

Binomial name
- Lachenalia nordenstamii W.F.Barker

Species of flowering plant

Lachenalia nordenstamii is a species of plant in the family Asparagaceae. The name is accepted by some authorities, but as of December 2012 not by the World Checklist of Selected Plant Families. It is endemic to Namibia. Its natural habitat is rocky areas.
