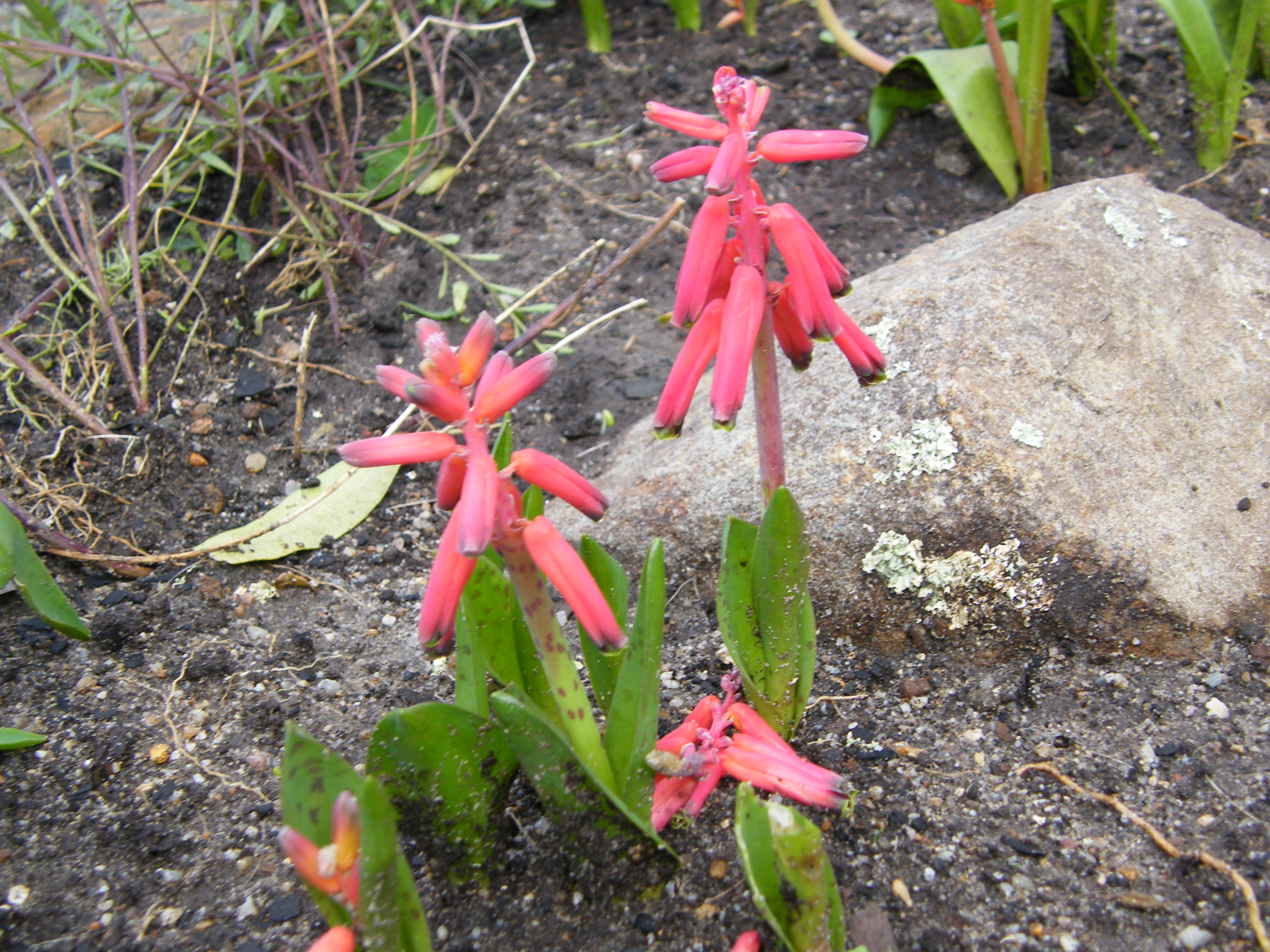

Scientific classification
- Kingdom: Plantae
- Clade: Tracheophytes
- Clade: Angiosperms
- Clade: Monocots
- Order: Asparagales
- Family: Asparagaceae
- Subfamily: Scilloideae
- Genus: Lachenalia
- Species: L. bulbifera

Binomial name
- Lachenalia bulbifera (Cirillo) Asch. & Graebn.

= Lachenalia bulbifera =

Species of flowering plant

Lachenalia bulbifera, syn. L. pendula, is a species of flowering plant in the family Asparagaceae, native to the Western Cape of South Africa. It is a bulbous perennial growing to 30 cm (12 in) tall by 5 cm (2 in) broad, with strap-shaped spotted leaves and fleshy stems bearing pendent tubular orange or red flowers 3 cm long, in winter and spring. The Latin bulbifera literally means "bulb-bearing", and refers to the plant's habit of producing bulblets, which can be separated from the parent plant and grown on.

This plant requires a sheltered, frost-free position, or it can be grown under glass. The species and its pink-flowered cultivar 'George' have gained the Royal Horticultural Society's Award of Garden Merit.
