= Lachenalia nutans =

Conservation status
- Least Concern (IUCN 3.1)

Scientific classification
- Kingdom: Plantae
- Clade: Tracheophytes
- Clade: Angiosperms
- Clade: Monocots
- Order: Asparagales
- Family: Asparagaceae
- Subfamily: Scilloideae
- Genus: Lachenalia
- Species: L. nutans

Binomial name
- Lachenalia nutans G.D.Duncan

Species of flowering plant

Lachenalia nutans is a species of plant that is endemic to Namibia. Its natural habitat is cold desert.
