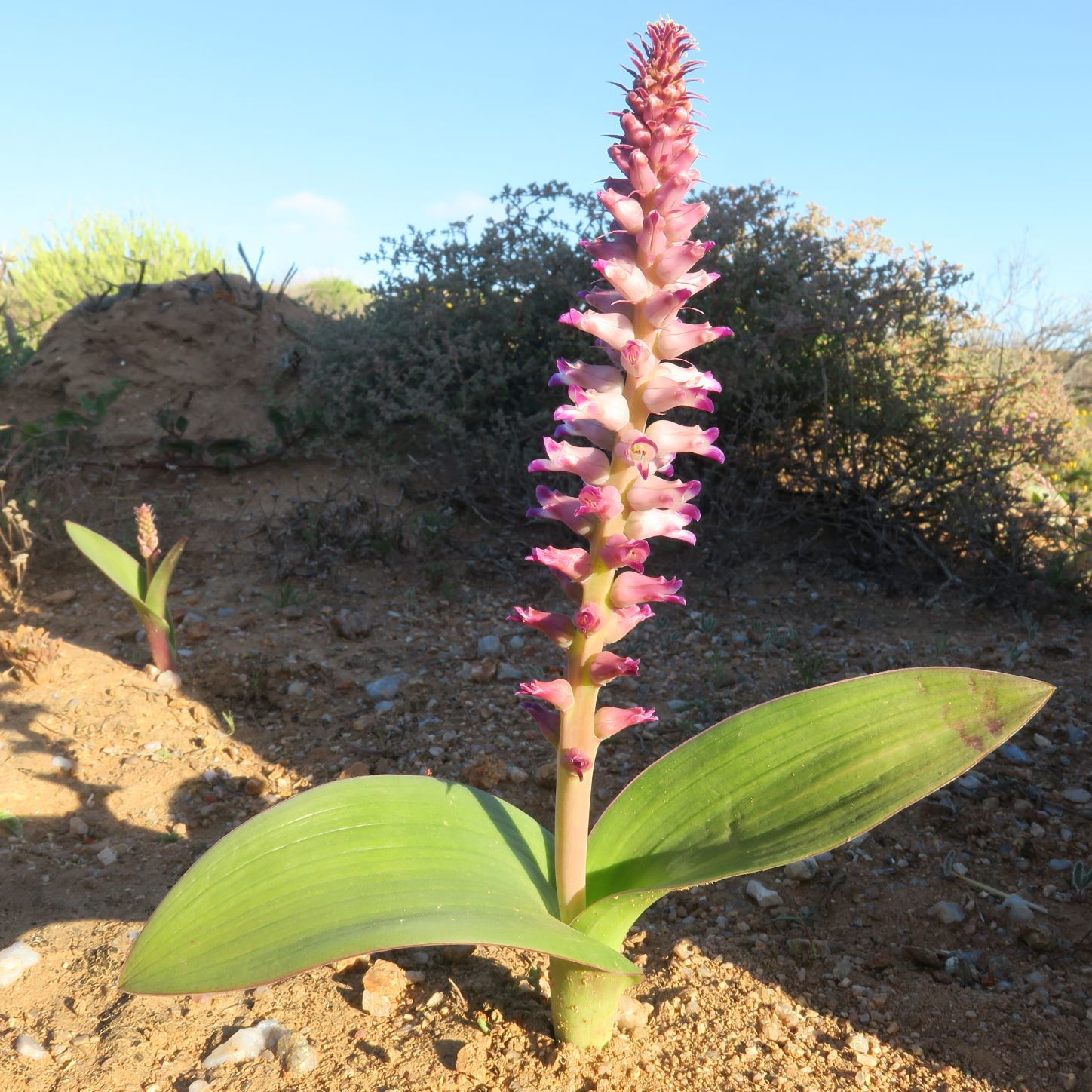

Conservation status
- Least Concern (SANBI Red List)

Scientific classification
- Kingdom: Plantae
- Clade: Tracheophytes
- Clade: Angiosperms
- Clade: Monocots
- Order: Asparagales
- Family: Asparagaceae
- Subfamily: Scilloideae
- Genus: Lachenalia
- Species: L. carnosa

Binomial name
- Lachenalia carnosa Baker

Synonyms
- Lachenalia ovatifolia L.Guthrie

= Lachenalia carnosa =

Geophyte endemic to the Cape Provinces

Lachenalia carnosa is a species of geophyte in the genus Lachenalia. It is endemic to the Northern Cape and Western Cape. It is also known by the names Namakwa- persviooltjie (Afrikaans for small purple Namaqua violin) and flesh viooltjie.

== Distribution ==
Lachenalia carnosa is widespread across Namaqualand, from Steinkopf to the southern Knersvlakte. It is common in central and western Namaqualand, and in the Kamiesberge.

== Habitat ==
Lachenalia carnosa is found in the Fynbos and Succulent Karoo. It occurs most often in gravelly clay or sandy soil, on granite outcrops.

== Conservation status ==
Lachenalia carnosa is classified as Least Concern as it is widespread, common and not in danger of extinction.
