= Lachenalia variegata =

Scientific classification
- Kingdom: Plantae
- Clade: Tracheophytes
- Clade: Angiosperms
- Clade: Monocots
- Order: Asparagales
- Family: Asparagaceae
- Subfamily: Scilloideae
- Genus: Lachenalia
- Species: L. variegata

Binomial name
- Lachenalia variegata W.F.Barker

South African plant species

Lachenalia variegata, also known as the spotty viooltjie, is a species of plant from the Western Cape of South Africa.

== Description ==
This bulbous geophyte grows 10–45 cm (3.9–17.7 in) tall. It has a single lance- or strap-shaped leaf with thickened margins. In rare cases, a plant may have two leaves. The upper surface is plain, with longitudinal grooves. The lower surface is marked with purple marks and splotches. The bulb has a diameter of 1–2 cm (0.39–0.79 in). The tunic is made of multiple layers. The outer layers are dark brown and spongy and the inner cataphyll is translucent white, tinged with magenta above.

Dense racemes of flowers are present between August and October. They are a greenish-grey in colour with darker green, blue, purple or brown markings. They have white tips.

== Distribution and habitat ==
This species is endemic to the Western Cape of South Africa, where it grows between Clanwilliam and the Cape Peninsula. It is most common in coastal areas with deep sand. It prefers calcareous and acidic soils.

== Conservation ==
This species is classified as being of least concern by the South African National Biodiversity Institute (SANBI).
