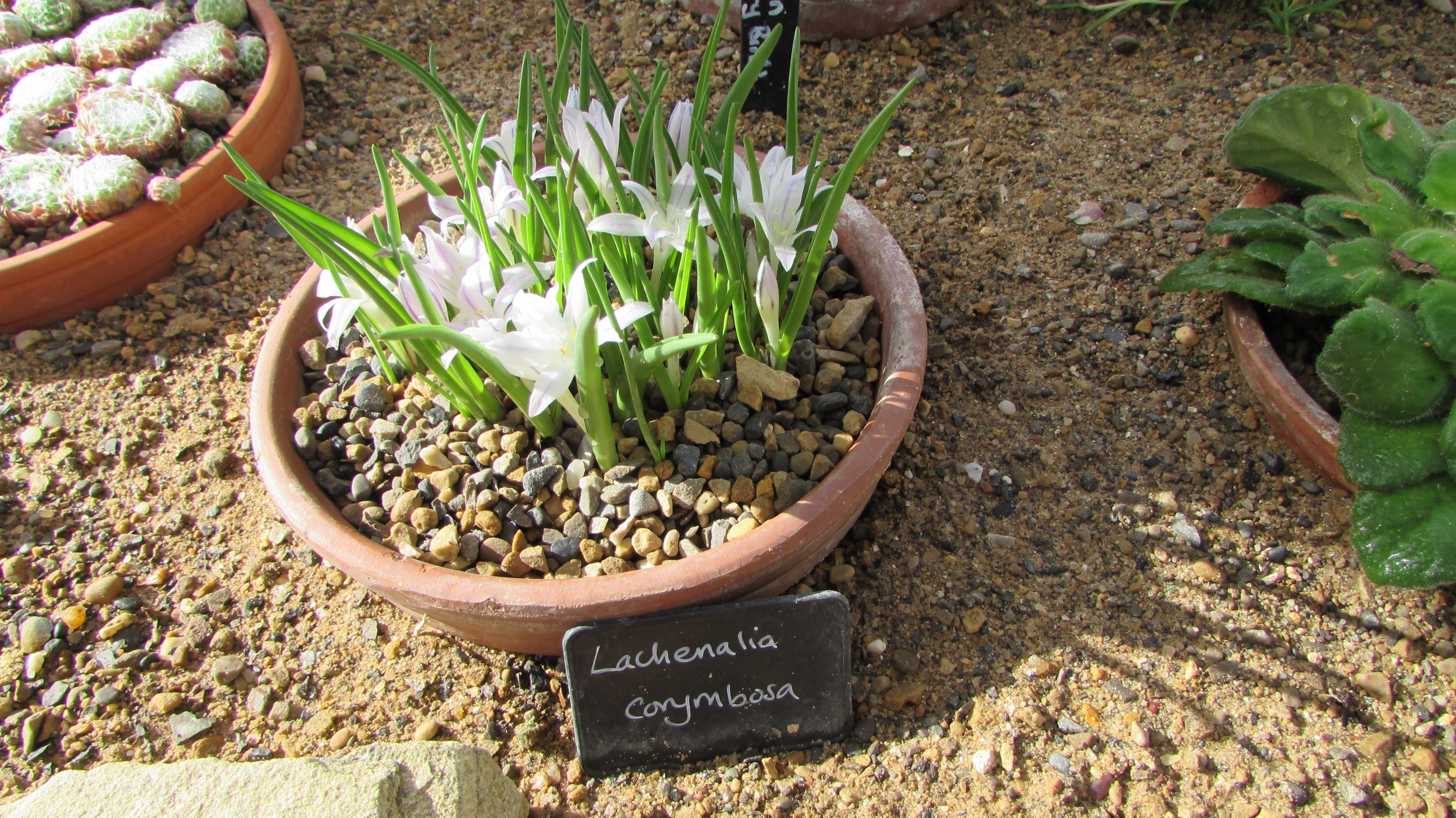

Scientific classification
- Kingdom: Plantae
- Clade: Embryophytes
- Clade: Tracheophytes
- Clade: Angiosperms
- Clade: Monocots
- Order: Asparagales
- Family: Asparagaceae
- Subfamily: Scilloideae
- Genus: Lachenalia
- Species: L. corymbosa

Binomial name
- Lachenalia corymbosa (L.) J.C.Manning & Goldblatt

Synonyms
- List: Hyacinthus corymbosus L.; Hyacinthus gawleri Baker; Massonia corymbosa (L.) Ker Gawl.; Massonia linearis Drège ex Kunth; Periboea corymbosa (L.) Kunth; Periboea gawleri Kunth; Polyxena corymbosa (L.) Jessop; Scilla brachyphylla Schult. & Schult.f.; Scilla corymbosa (L.) Ker Gawl.

= Lachenalia corymbosa =

Species of flowering plant

Lachenalia corymbosa, the corymbous Cape cowslip, is a species of flowering plant in the genus Lachenalia native to the southwest Cape Provinces of South Africa. It has gained the Royal Horticultural Society's Award of Garden Merit.
