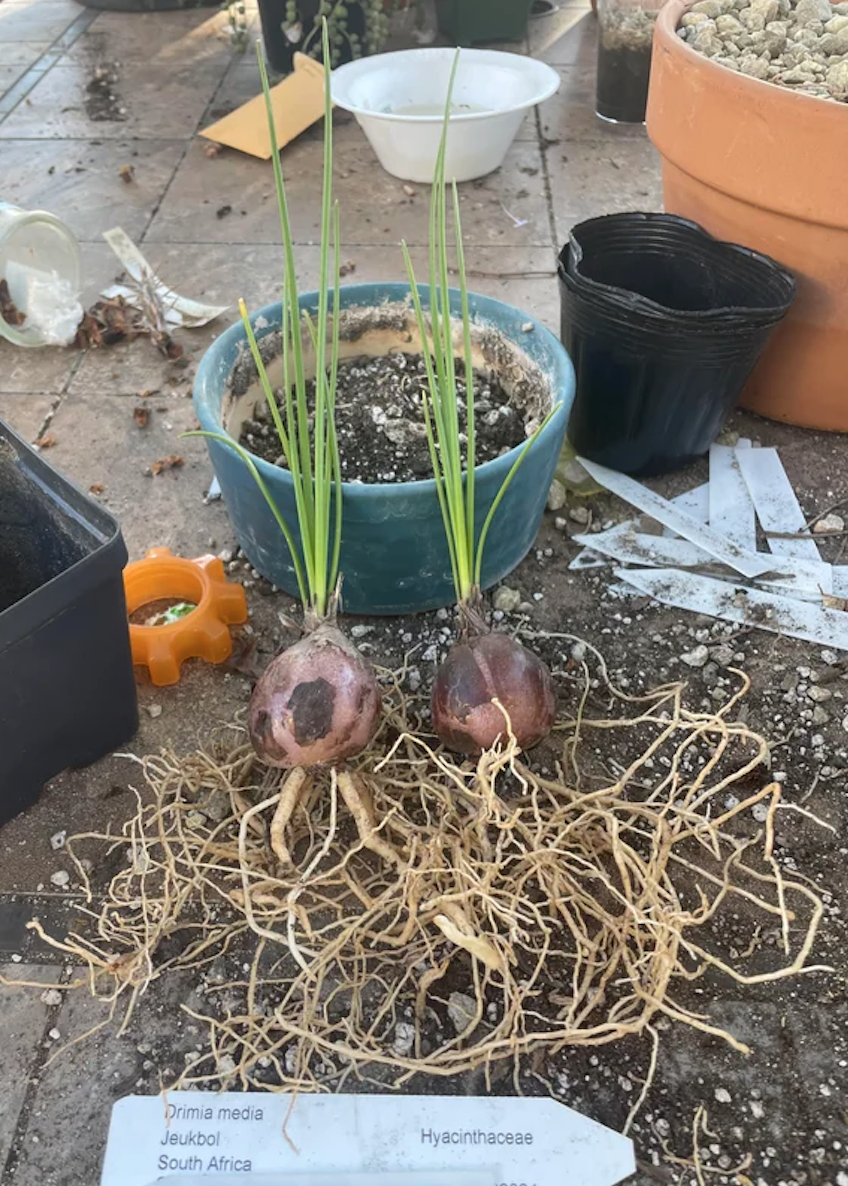

Scientific classification
- Kingdom: Plantae
- Clade: Tracheophytes
- Clade: Angiosperms
- Clade: Monocots
- Order: Asparagales
- Family: Asparagaceae
- Subfamily: Scilloideae
- Genus: Drimia
- Species: D. media

Binomial name
- Drimia media Jacq. ex Willd.

= Drimia media =

Species of flowering plant

Drimia media is a species of Drimia native to South Africa. It is a bulb plant like other Drimia species, such as Drimia platyphylla. It was described in 1799 by Jacq Willid.

== Description ==
It is a bulbular Drimia, with long, rigid leaves, that are cylindrical with pointed tips likely to maximize exposure to the sun and reduce loss of water. Its bulbs about 2 inches across when mature. Multiple leaves grow from each bulb. This plant grows in winter.

== Flowers ==
Its flowers grow on a stalk, and in a loose clump in Autumn. It is brownish on the outside of the tubular petals, and with antlers that are purple or blue.
