= Drimia nagarjunae =

Scientific classification
- Kingdom: Plantae
- Clade: Tracheophytes
- Clade: Angiosperms
- Clade: Monocots
- Order: Asparagales
- Family: Asparagaceae
- Subfamily: Scilloideae
- Genus: Drimia
- Species: D. nagarjunae

Binomial name
- Drimia nagarjunae (Hemadri & Swahari) Anand Kumar

Synonyms
- Urginea nagarjunae Hemadri & Swahari

Species of flowering plant

Drimia nagarjunae is a species of flowering plant in the family Asparagaceae, subfamily Scilloideae. It was included in Drimia indica, but is accepted as a separate species. It is distributed in south India.

== Taxonomy ==
Drimia nagarjunae was first described, as Urginea nagarjunae by Hemadri and Swahari in 1982. They noted that it had been previously mistaken for Drimia indica, but differed in having a thicker scape, flowers closer together in the inflorescence and with tepals that are not reflexed. The specific epithet refers to Nagarjunakonda, near Nagarjuna Sagar Dam where the bulb is first identified; bulbs of the new species had been collected in a "medico-ethnobotanical survey". Hemadri and Swahari's differentiation of D. nagarjunae from D. indica was initially not accepted, but it is now considered to be a separate species.
