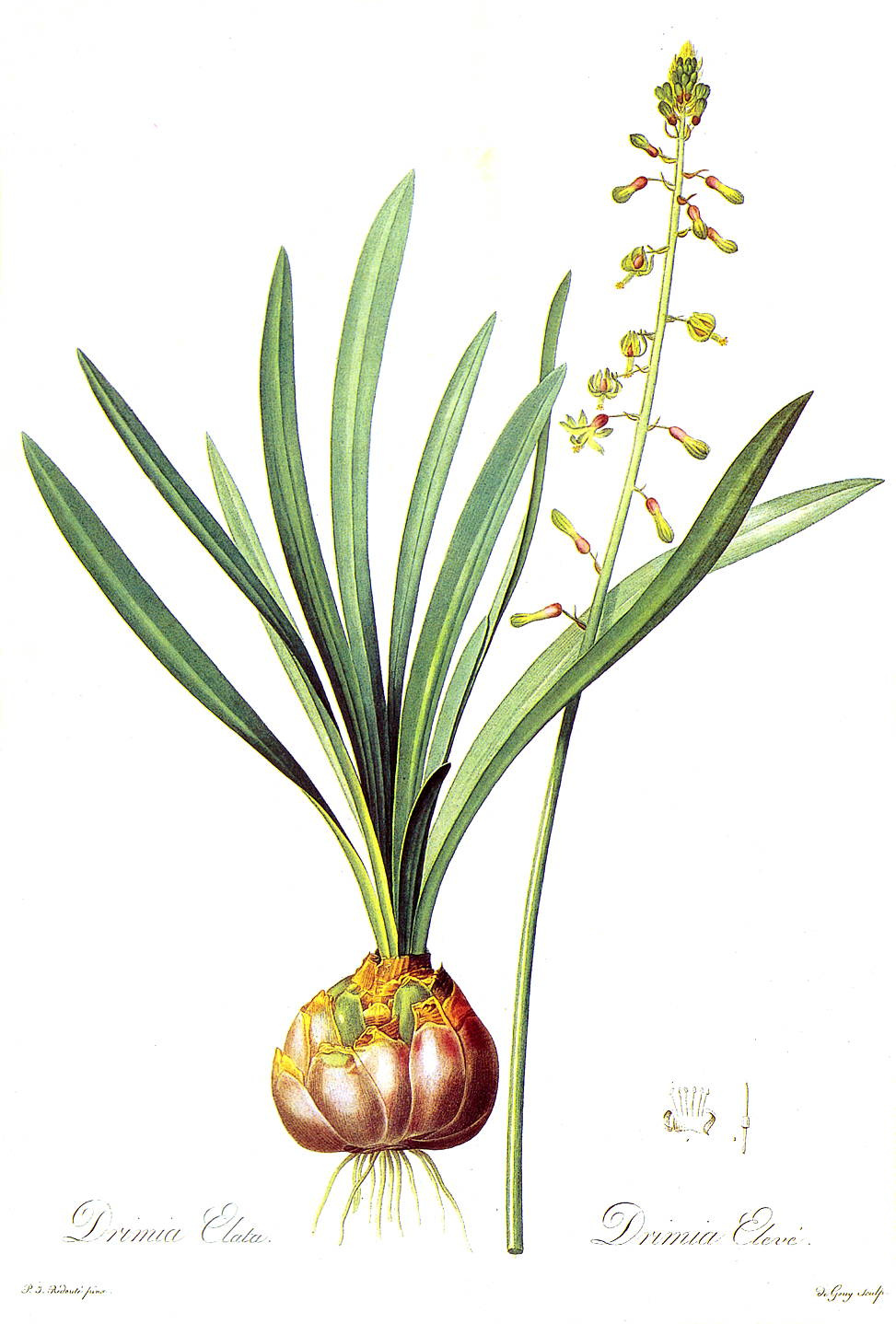
- Botanical illustration from Les Liliacées by Pierre-Joseph Redouté

Scientific classification
- Kingdom: Plantae
- Clade: Tracheophytes
- Clade: Angiosperms
- Clade: Monocots
- Order: Asparagales
- Family: Asparagaceae
- Subfamily: Scilloideae
- Genus: Drimia
- Species: D. elata

Binomial name
- Drimia elata Jacq.

= Drimia elata =

Species of flowering plant

Drimia elata ("Satin squill") is a species of flowering plant in the family Asparagaceae, subfamily Scilloideae. It is widely distributed in eastern and southern Africa.

== Description ==
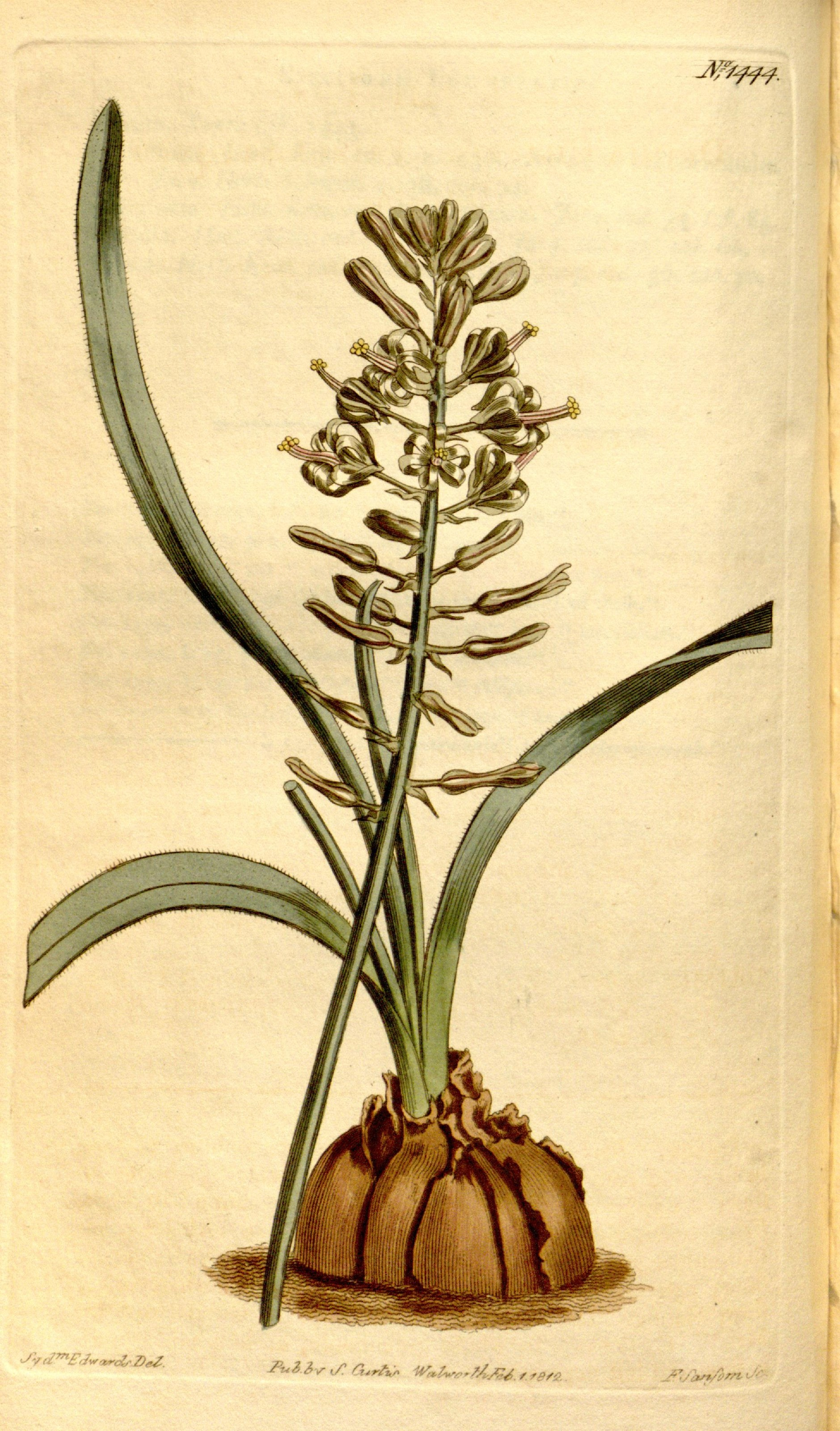
Botanical illustration of Drimia elata

Drimia elata is a perennial, growing from a bulb with reddish scales, and reaching a maximum height of 100 cm. The leaves are long (circa 25 cm) slender (1–2 cm), linear to narrowly lanceolate, sometimes wavy with minute hairs especially along the margins.

The inflorescence appears between December and April (southern hemisphere), after the leaves are already dry. It is borne on a scape up to 1.2 m (4 ft) tall, and takes the form of a thin, dense, terminal raceme.

The individual flowers are grey-white to purple-brown. They have recurved tepal lobes, and dark blueish purple anthers. The flowers are pedicellate, subtended by a bract with a small and distinctive spur near its base. The trilocular, oblong fruit capsule contains the small ovate seeds.

== Taxonomy ==
Drimia elata was described by Nikolaus Joseph von Jacquin in a work published in 1797. The species was subsequently included in the fourth edition of Species Plantarum, published in 1799, authored by Carl Ludwig Willdenow. It is the type species of the genus Drimia. The specific epithet elata means "tall".

== Distribution and habitat ==
Drimia elata is found in east and southern Africa: Sudan, Kenya, Tanzania, Uganda, Angola, Malawi, Mozambique, Zambia, Zimbabwe, Botswana, Eswatini and South Africa. In Zimbabwe, it is noted as occurring in rocky grassland. In South Africa, where it occurs from Namaqualand to Cape Town and across the southern Cape, it is recorded as growing on sandy to clay-rich soils, in Renosterveld and Succulent Karoo vegetation.
