= Drimia pancration =

Scientific classification
- Kingdom: Plantae
- Clade: Tracheophytes
- Clade: Angiosperms
- Clade: Monocots
- Order: Asparagales
- Family: Asparagaceae
- Subfamily: Scilloideae
- Genus: Drimia
- Species: D. pancration

Binomial name
- Drimia pancration (Steinh.) J.C.Manning & Goldblatt (2003 publ. 2004)

Synonyms
- Charybdis pancration (Steinh.) Speta (1998); Scilla pancration (Steinh.) Nyman (1855); Squilla insularis ord. & Fourr. (1868); Squilla littoralis Jord. & Fourr. (1868); Squilla pancration Steinh. (1836); Urginea insularis (Jord. & Fourr.) Grey (1938); Urginea littoralis (Jord. & Fourr.) Grey (1938); Urginea maritima subsp. insularis (Jord. & Fourr.) K.Richt. (1890); Urginea maritima subsp. littoralis (Jord. & Fourr.) K.Richt. (1890); Urginea maritima var. pancration (Steinh.) Baker (1873); Urginea maritima subsp. pancration (Steinh.) K.Richt. (1890); Urginea scilla var. pancration (Steinh.) Nyman (1882)

Species of plant

Drimia pancration is a species of plants in the family Asparagaceae. It is a bulbous geophyte native to the lands in and around the western and central Mediterranean, including mainland Spain, the Balearic Islands, Corsica, Sardinia, Sicily, Malta, mainland Italy, Tunisia, and former Yugoslavia.

== Sources ==
This article incorporates text from a free content work. Licensed under CC0 (license statement/permission). Text taken from Drimia pancration. Encyclopedia of Life.
