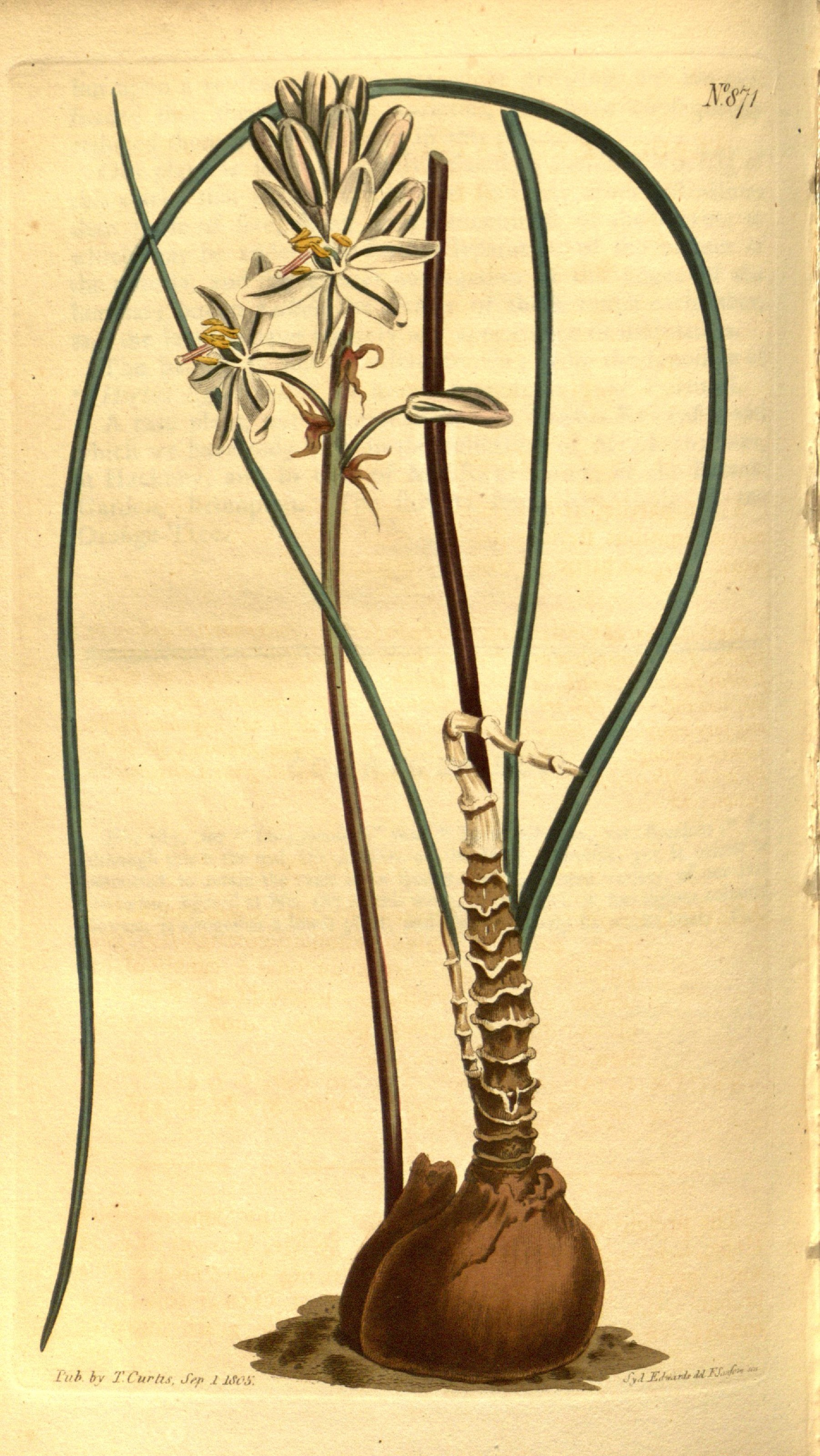
- The distinctive horizontally-collared sheath at the base of the rosette, can be seen in this illustration.

Scientific classification
- Kingdom: Plantae
- Clade: Tracheophytes
- Clade: Angiosperms
- Clade: Monocots
- Order: Asparagales
- Family: Asparagaceae
- Subfamily: Scilloideae
- Genus: Drimia
- Species: D. exuviata

Binomial name
- Drimia exuviata (Jacq.) Jessop

= Drimia exuviata =

Species of flowering plant

Drimia exuviata ("Gifbol") is a species of flowering plant in the family Asparagaceae, subfamily Scilloideae, indigenous to the south-western parts of South Africa.

== Description ==
A geophytic perennial, that can reach up to a meter in height with their flower-stems (normally 80 cm).

It has a small number of leaves that are long, slender (3-4mm wide), cylindrical, erect, leathery-surfaced quills. The rosette of leaves is basally enclosed in a grey, papery sheath that has distinctive horizontal bars around it.

The rose-scented, star-shaped flowers are white (rarely pink), and appear between September and October (southern hemisphere). Each petal with a dark midline (keel). Like most species of Drimia, it has a distinctively spurred bract, at the base of each flower's pedicel.

This species has a distinctive horizontally-collared sheath, around the base of its rosette. This grey sheath can be used to identify it from its closest relatives.

== Distribution ==
It occurs in rocky, loamy soils of clay or derived from granite, in the south-west of South Africa.

It is common in the Overberg, Robertson Karoo and West Coast regions of the Western Cape Province. Although its centre of distribution is in that Province, outlying populations are found as far east as Port Elizabeth, and northwards into the Namaqualand. In the south-western cape it co-occurs with its smaller relative, Drimia filifolia, which has much thinner (c.1mm) leaves.
