= Drimia zambesiaca =

Scientific classification
- Kingdom: Plantae
- Clade: Tracheophytes
- Clade: Angiosperms
- Clade: Monocots
- Order: Asparagales
- Family: Asparagaceae
- Subfamily: Scilloideae
- Genus: Drimia
- Species: D. zambesiaca

Binomial name
- Drimia zambesiaca (Baker) J.C.Manning & Goldblatt

Synonyms
- Synonymy: Albuca reflexa K.Krause & Dinter; Drimia laxiflora Baker; Idothea laxiflora (Baker) Kuntze; Iosanthus amboensis (Baker) Mart.-Azorín, M.B.Crespo & M.Á.Alonso; Ornithogalum desertorum J.C.Manning & Goldblatt; Thuranthos laxiflorus (Baker) Mart.-Azorín, M.B.Crespo & M.Á.Alonso; Thuranthos zambesiacus (Baker) Kativu; Urginea amboensis Baker; Urginea salmonea Berhaut; Urginea sebirii Berhaut; Urginea zambesiaca Baker (1873) (basionym); Vera-duthiea amboensis (Baker) Mart.-Azorín, M.B.Crespo, M.Pinter & Wetschnig; Vera-duthiea reflexa (K.Krause & Dinter) Mart.-Azorín, M.B.Crespo, M.Pinter & Wetschnig; Vera-duthiea salmonea (Berhaut) Mart.-Azorín, M.B.Crespo, M.Pinter & Wetschnig; Vera-duthiea sebirii (Berhaut) Mart.-Azorín, M.B.Crespo, M.Pinter & Wetschnig; Vera-duthiea zambesiaca (Baker) N.R.Crouch & Mart.-Azorín; Zingela pooleyorum N.R.Crouch, Mart.-Azorín, M.B.Crespo, M.Pinter & M.Á.Alonso

Species of flowering plant

Drimia zambesaica is a species of flowering plant in the family Asparagaceae. It is a bulbous geophyte native to tropical and southern Africa, ranging from Mauritania to Ethiopia and south to KwaZulu-Natal in South Africa.

Specimens were previously misidentified as Drimia indica. In 2018 Crouch et al. described a new species and monotypic genus, Zingela pooleyorum. In 2019 John C. Manning discovered that Z. pooleyorum was identical with a 1994 description of Urginea zambesiaca by Kativu and Drummond. Manning placed the species in the genus Drimia, with the older specific epithet zambesaica taking precedence.
