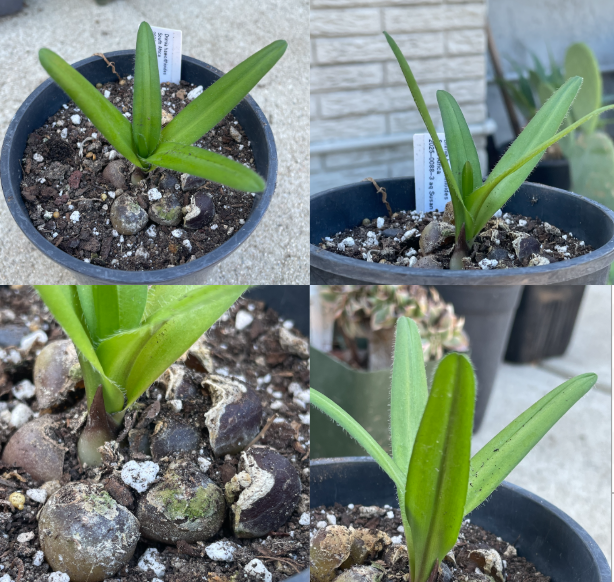

Scientific classification
- Kingdom: Plantae
- Clade: Tracheophytes
- Clade: Angiosperms
- Clade: Monocots
- Order: Asparagales
- Family: Asparagaceae
- Subfamily: Scilloideae
- Genus: Drimia
- Species: D. haworthioides

Binomial name
- Drimia haworthioides Baker

= Drimia haworthioides =

Species of plant

Drimia haworthioides is a species of Drimia native to South Africa.

== Description ==
=== Bulbs ===
The bulbs of this plant resemble the Haworthia plant. They are mostly underground, with a small portion sometimes sticking above ground. The bulbs have oblong petals, and have meaty surface portions and thin bottoms connecting them to the single growth point in the middle.

=== Leaves ===
The leaves of this plant are usually green and oval-shaped. Multiple leaves grow from a single growth point on each bulb. The leaves have trichomes which allow it to capture water.
