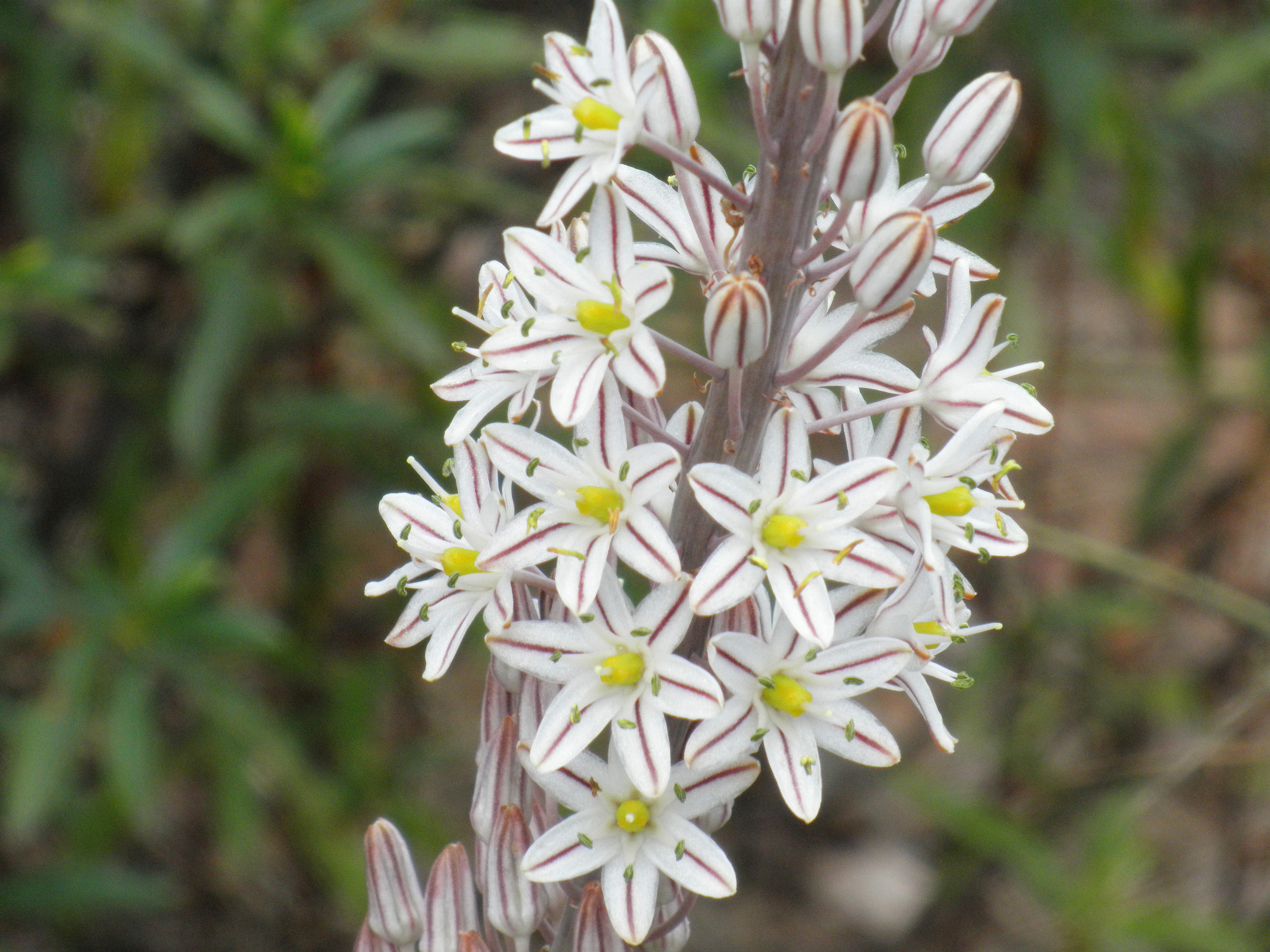
- Drimia maritima growing in the Sierra Madrona, Spain.

Scientific classification
- Kingdom: Plantae
- Clade: Tracheophytes
- Clade: Angiosperms
- Clade: Monocots
- Order: Asparagales
- Family: Asparagaceae
- Subfamily: Scilloideae
- Genus: Drimia; Jacq. ex Willd.

Synonyms
- List: Adenotheca Welw. ex Baker; Aulostemon Mart.-Azorín, M.B.Crespo, M.Pinter & Wetschnig; Austronea Mart.-Azorín, M.B.Crespo, M.Pinter & Wetschnig; Boosia Speta; Charybdis Speta; Duthiea Speta; Ebertia Speta; Fusifilum Raf.; Geschollia Speta; Idothea Kunth; Idothearia C.Presl; Indurgia Speta; Ledurgia Speta; Litanthus Harv.; Mucinaea M.Pinter, Mart.-Azorín, U.Müll.-Doblies, D.Müll.-Doblies, Pf; Physodia Salisb.; Pilasia Raf.; Rhadamanthopsis (Oberm.) Speta; Rhadamanthus Salisb.; Rhodocodon Baker; Sagittanthera Mart.-Azorín; Schizobasis Baker; Sekanama Speta; Spirophyllos Mart.-Azorín, M.B.Crespo & M.Á.Alonso; Squilla Steinh.; Strepsiphyla Raf.; Striatula M.Pinter, Mart.-Azorín, M.B.Crespo & Wetschnig; Sypharissa Salisb.; Tenicroa Raf.; Thuranthos C.H.Wright; Triandra Mart.-Azorín, M.B.Crespo, M.Á.Alonso, N.R.Crouch & M.Pinter; Urginavia Speta; Urginea Steinh.; Urgineopsis Compton; Vera-duthiea Speta; Zingela N.R.Crouch, Mart.-Azorín, M.B.Crespo, M.Pinter & M.Á.Alonso; Zulusia Mart.-Azorín, N.R.Crouch, M.B.Crespo & M.Á.Alonso

= Drimia =

Genus of flowering plants

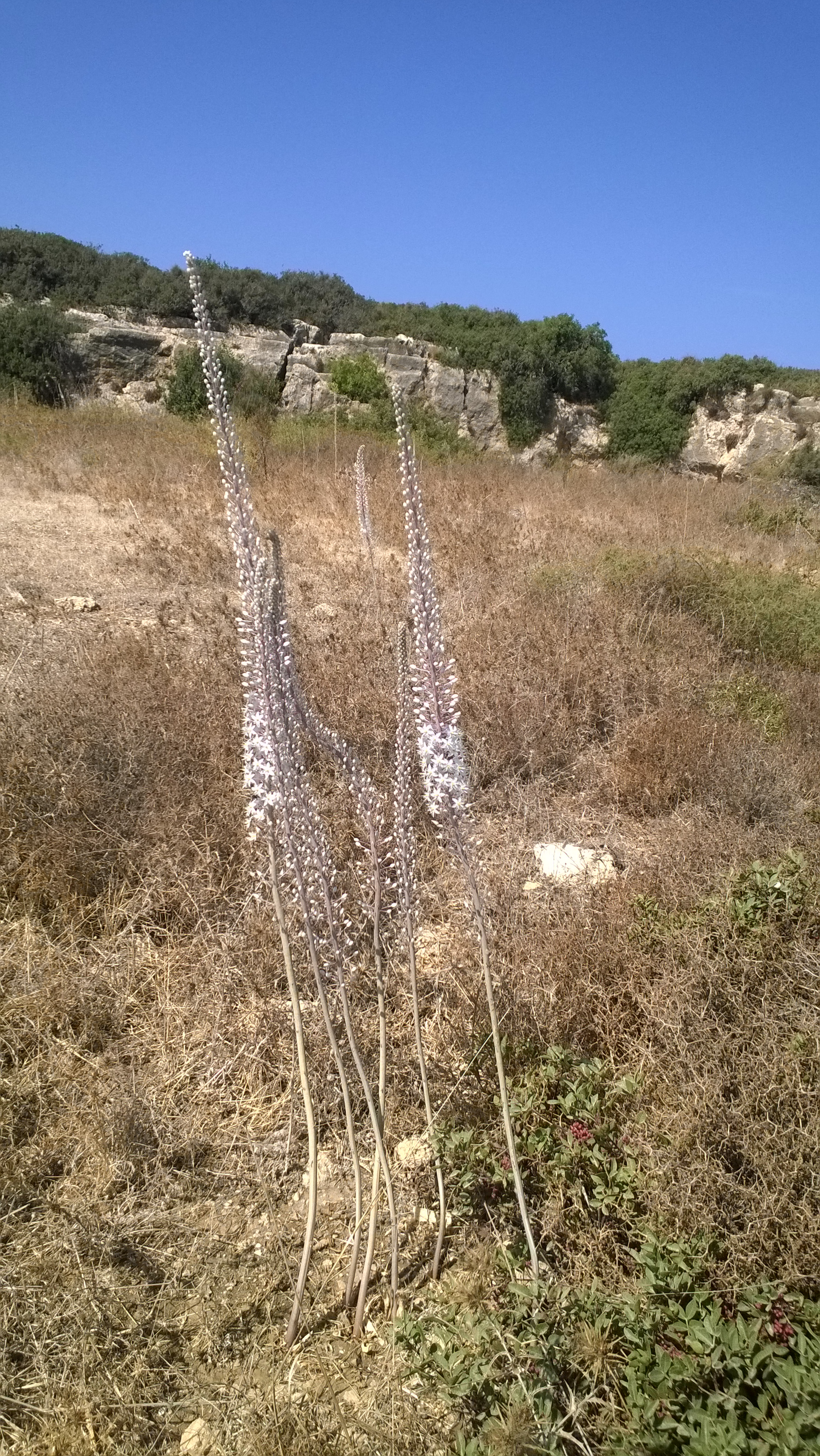
Drimia maritima flowering in Khurvat Karta, Israel

Drimia is a genus of African, south European and south Asian flowering plants. In the APG IV classification system, it is placed in the family Asparagaceae, subfamily Scilloideae (formerly known as Hyacinthaceae). When broadly circumscribed, the genus includes a number of other genera previously treated separately, including Litanthus, Rhodocodon, Schizobasis and Urginea.

One of the best-known species is the sea squill, Drimia maritima (formerly Urginea maritima).

== Description ==
Drimia species are usually deciduous, more rarely evergreen, growing from bulbs. The bulbs may be underground or occur on or near the surface. Each bulb has one to several leaves that are often dry by the time the flowers open. The inflorescence is in the form of a raceme, with one to many flowers. At least the lower inflorescence bracts have spurs (a characteristic of the tribe Urgineeae). The individual flowers generally last for only one to two days and have white to yellowish green or brown tepals that are either free or joined into a basal tube. The tepals often have a darker central keel. After fertilization, an ovoid capsule forms with several seeds in each locule. The seeds are black and winged.

== Taxonomy ==
A formal description of genus Drimia first appeared in the fourth edition of Species Plantarum, published in 1799, authored by Carl Ludwig Willdenow. The name was attributed to Nikolaus Joseph von Jacquin. When describing Drimia elata (the type species of the genus) in a work published in 1797, Jacquin said that he was unable to assign it to one of the known genera, and so constructed a new one. The name is derived from the Greek δριμεῖα drimeia, the feminine form of the adjective δριμύς drimys meaning "bitter" or "acrid", referring to the taste of the bulb.

The boundaries between genera within the Scilloideae are not completely settled. The situation has been described as being in a "state of flux". As early as 1977, it was suggested that Urginea be merged into Drimia, although other small genera continued to be kept separate. In 2000, Peter Goldblatt and John Charles Manning proposed including other related genera, including Litanthus, Rhadamanthus and Schizobasis, a position supported later by some molecular phylogenetic studies. This broad circumscription of Drimia is accepted by the World Checklist of Selected Plant Families. Other sources prefer to maintain a larger number of segregated genera. Regardless of whether a broad or strict view is taken of Drimia, it is placed in the tribe Urgineeae of the subfamily Scilloideae (or the subfamily Urgineoideae of the family Hyacinthaceae if this family is separated from Asparagaceae).

=== Litanthus group ===
The genus Litanthus was for a long time monotypic, with the sole species L. pusillus, before in 2000 Goldblatt and Manning included it in Drimia. A further species, Drimia stenocarpa, was added to the group in 2014. The Litanthus group is characterized by one- or occasionally two-flowered inflorescences with drooping tubular flowers whose tepals are united at the base for more than half their length.

=== Rhodocodon group ===
The genus Rhodocodon was included in Drimia by Goldblatt and Manning in 2000. The species of Rhodocodon, or the Rhodocodon group within Drimia, including D. cryptopoda, form a well supported clade endemic to Madagascar. They appear to be the product of a single invasion of Madagascar by an African species. A total of 13 species are recognized by those who separate the genus from Drimia.

=== Schizobasis group ===
The genus Schizobasis was included in Drimia by Goldblatt and Manning in 2000. As many as eight species have been described, but in 2014 these were reduced to two: Drimia intricata, including all the previously described species, and the new species Drimia sigmoidea. The Schizobasis group is distinguished by its well branched, thin-stemmed inflorescence and small, filiform leaves that are found only in seedlings, disappearing in mature plants.

=== Species ===
As of September 2025, Plants of the World Online accepts 130 species.

- Drimia acarophylla E.Brink & A.P.Dold
- Drimia albiflora (B.Nord.) J.C.Manning & Goldblatt
- Drimia altissima (L.f.) Ker Gawl.
- Drimia anomala (Baker) Baker
- Drimia anthericoides (Poir.) Véla & Bélair
- Drimia aphylla (Forssk.) J.C.Manning & Goldblatt
- Drimia arenicola (B.Nord.) J.C.Manning & Goldblatt
- Drimia aurantiaca (H.Lindb.) J.C.Manning & Goldblatt
- Drimia barbata J.C.Manning & J.M.J.Deacon
- Drimia barkerae Oberm. ex J.C.Manning & Goldblatt
- Drimia basutica (E.Phillips) J.C.Manning & Goldblatt
- Drimia brachyandra (Mart.-Azorín, A.P.Dold & M.B.Crespo) J.C.Manning & Goldblatt
- Drimia brachystachys (Baker) Stedje
- Drimia calcarata (Baker) Stedje
- Drimia capensis (Burm.f.) Wijnands
- Drimia chalumnensis A.P.Dold & E.Brink
- Drimia ciliata (L.f.) J.C.Manning & Goldblatt
- Drimia ciliolata J.C.Manning & J.M.J.Deacon
- Drimia cochlearis Mart.-Azorín
- Drimia congesta Bullock
- Drimia convallarioides (L.f.) J.C.Manning & Goldblatt
- Drimia coromandeliana (Roxb.) Lekhak & P.B.Yadav
- Drimia cryptopoda (Baker) Pfosser
- Drimia cyanelloides (Baker) J.C.Manning & Goldblatt
- Drimia decipiens J.C.Manning & Goldblatt
- Drimia delagoensis (Baker) Jessop
- Drimia densiflora (Mart.-Azorín, M.B.Crespo & A.P.Dold) J.C.Manning & Goldblatt
- Drimia depressa (Baker) Jessop
- Drimia dregei (Baker) J.C.Manning & Goldblatt
- Drimia echinostachya (Baker) Eggli & N.R.Crouch
- Drimia ecklonii (Baker) J.C.Manning & Goldblatt
- Drimia edwardsii N.R.Crouch & Mart.-Azorín
- Drimia elata Jacq.
- Drimia exigua Stedje
- Drimia exuviata (Jacq.) Jessop
- Drimia fasciata (B.Nord.) J.C.Manning & Goldblatt
- Drimia filifolia (Poir.) J.C.Manning & Goldblatt
- Drimia fimbrimarginata Snijman
- Drimia flagellaris T.J.Edwards
- Drimia fragrans (Jacq.) J.C.Manning & Goldblatt
- Drimia fugax (Moris) Stearn
- Drimia glaucescens (Engl. & K.Krause) H.Scholz
- Drimia glaucophylla (Bacch., Brullo, D'Emerico, Pontec. & Salmeri) Raus
- Drimia globuligera (Mart.-Azorín, A.P.Dold & M.B.Crespo) J.C.Manning & Goldblatt
- Drimia govindappae (A.Boraiah & Fathima) Lekhak & P.B.Yadav
- Drimia guineensis (Speta) J.C.Manning & Goldblatt
- Drimia haworthioides Baker
- Drimia hesperantha J.C.Manning & Goldblatt
- Drimia hesperia (Webb & Berthel.) J.C.Manning & Goldblatt
- Drimia hispidoplicata (Mart.-Azorín, M.B.Crespo, M.Pinter & M.Á.Alonso) J.C.Manning & Goldblatt
- Drimia hockii De Wild.
- Drimia hyacinthoides Baker
- Drimia incerta A.Chev. ex Hutch.
- Drimia indica (Roxb.) Jessop
- Drimia intricata (Baker) J.C.Manning & Goldblatt
- Drimia involuta (J.C.Manning & Snijman) J.C.Manning & Goldblatt
- Drimia jackyi (Knirsch, Mart.-Azorín & Wetschnig) Christenh. & Byng
- Drimia jeevae Karupp. & V.Ravich.
- Drimia johnstonii (Baker) J.C.Manning & Goldblatt
- Drimia juncifolia J.C.Manning & J.M.J.Deacon
- Drimia karooica (Oberm.) J.C.Manning & Goldblatt
- Drimia khubusensis P.C.van Wyk & J.C.Manning
- Drimia kniphofioides (Baker) J.C.Manning & Goldblatt
- Drimia ledermannii K.Krause
- Drimia longipedicellata (Mart.-Azorín, Wetschnig, M.Pinter & M.B.Crespo) J.C.Manning & Goldblatt
- Drimia macrantha (Baker) Baker
- Drimia macrocarpa Stedje
- Drimia macrocentra (Baker) Jessop
- Drimia marginata (Thunb.) Jessop
- Drimia maritima (L.) Stearn
- Drimia mascarenensis (Baker) J.C.Manning & Goldblatt
- Drimia maura (Maire) J.C.Manning & Goldblatt
- Drimia media Jacq. ex Willd.
- Drimia minor (A.V.Duthie) Jessop
- Drimia minuta Goldblatt & J.C.Manning
- Drimia modesta (Baker) Jessop
- Drimia monophylla Oberm. ex J.C.Manning & Goldblatt
- Drimia montana A.P.Dold & E.Brink
- Drimia multifolia (G.J.Lewis) Jessop
- Drimia multisetosa (Baker) Jessop
- Drimia mzimvubuensis van Jaarsv.
- Drimia nagarjunae (Hemadri & Swahari) Anand Kumar
- Drimia nana (Snijman) J.C.Manning & Goldblatt
- Drimia noctiflora (Batt. & Trab.) Stearn
- Drimia numidica (Jord. & Fourr.) J.C.Manning & Goldblatt
- Drimia occultans G.Will.
- Drimia oliverorum J.C.Manning
- Drimia ollivieri (Maire) Stearn
- Drimia palaestina M.B.Crespo, Mart.-Azorín & M.Á.Alonso
- Drimia pancration (Steinh.) J.C.Manning & Goldblatt
- Drimia pellabergensis (Mart.-Azorín, M.B.Crespo, M.Á.Alonso, N.R.Crouch & M.Pinter) J.C.Manning & Goldblatt
- Drimia physodes (Jacq.) Jessop
- Drimia pinguis (Mart.-Azorín, M.B.Crespo, M.Pinter & M.Á.Alonso) J.C.Manning & Goldblatt
- Drimia platyphylla (B.Nord.) J.C.Manning & Goldblatt
- Drimia polyantha (Blatt. & McCann) Stearn
- Drimia porphyrantha (Bullock) Stedje
- Drimia prolifera (Mart.-Azorín, A.P.Dold & M.B.Crespo) J.C.Manning & Goldblatt
- Drimia psilostachya (Welw. ex Baker) J.C.Manning & Goldblatt
- Drimia pulchromarginata J.C.Manning & Goldblatt
- Drimia purpurascens J.Jacq.
- Drimia raogibikei (Hemadri) Hemadri
- Drimia razii Ansari
- Drimia rupicola (Trimen) Dassan. in M.D.Daddanayake & al. (eds.)
- Drimia salteri (Compton) J.C.Manning & Goldblatt
- Drimia sanguinea (Schinz) Jessop
- Drimia schizobasoides J.C.Manning & J.M.J.Deacon
- Drimia sclerophylla J.C.Manning & Goldblatt
- Drimia secunda (B.Nord.) J.C.Manning & Goldblatt
- Drimia secundiflora (Maire) M.B.Crespo, Mart.-Azorín & M.Á.Alonso
- Drimia senegalensis (Kunth) J.C.Manning & Goldblatt
- Drimia serotina (Schousb.) M.B.Crespo, Mart.-Azorín & M.Á.Alonso
- Drimia sigmoidea J.C.Manning & J.M.J.Deacon
- Drimia simensis (Hochst. ex A.Rich.) Stedje
- Drimia sphaerocephala Baker in W.H.Harvey & auct. suc. (eds.)
- Drimia stenocarpa J.C.Manning & J.M.J.Deacon
- Drimia sudanica Friis & Vollesen
- Drimia toxicaria (C.Archer & R.H.Archer) J.C.Manning & Goldblatt
- Drimia trichophylla Mart.-Azorín, A.P.Dold & M.B.Crespo
- Drimia uniflora J.C.Manning & Goldblatt
- Drimia uranthera (R.A.Dyer) J.C.Manning & Goldblatt
- Drimia urgineoides (Baker) J.C.Manning & Goldblatt
- Drimia vermiformis J.C.Manning & Goldblatt
- Drimia vespertina J.C.Manning & Goldblatt
- Drimia virens (Schltr.) J.C.Manning & Goldblatt
- Drimia viridula (Baker) J.C.Manning & Goldblatt
- Drimia wightii Lakshmin.
- Drimia zambesiaca (Baker) J.C.Manning & Goldblatt
- Drimia zebrina (Mart.-Azorín, N.R.Crouch & M.B.Crespo) J.C.Manning & Goldblatt
- Drimia zebrinella J.C.Manning & Goldblatt

In addition, 10 species described in 2015, and placed by the authors in Rhodocodon, are, as of August 2017, treated as "unplaced" in the World Checklist of Selected Plant Families, which does not recognize the genus; none have names in Drimia:

- Rhodocodon apiculatus H.Perrier ex Knirsch, Mart.-Azorín & Wetschnig
- Rhodocodon calcicola Knirsch, Mart.-Azorín & Wetschnig
- Rhodocodon campanulatus Knirsch, Mart.-Azorín & Wetschnig
- Rhodocodon cyathiformis H.Perrier ex Knirsch, Mart.-Azorín & Wetschnig
- Rhodocodon floribundus H.Perrier ex Knirsch, Mart.-Azorín & Wetschnig
- Rhodocodon graciliscapus Knirsch, Mart.-Azorín & Wetschnig
- Rhodocodon intermedius H.Perrier ex Knirsch, Mart.-Azorín & Wetschnig
- Rhodocodon linearifolius Knirsch, Mart.-Azorín & Wetschnig
- Rhodocodon monophyllus Knirsch, Mart.-Azorín & Wetschnig
- Rhodocodon rotundus H.Perrier ex Knirsch, Mart.-Azorín & Wetschnig

== Distribution and habitat ==
The broadly defined genus has about 130 species found in Africa, including Madagascar, the Mediterranean region and southern Asia. About half of all the species occur in southern Africa, where species diversity is greatest in semi-arid regions with winter rainfall. Drimia generally is found in regions with seasonal dryness.
