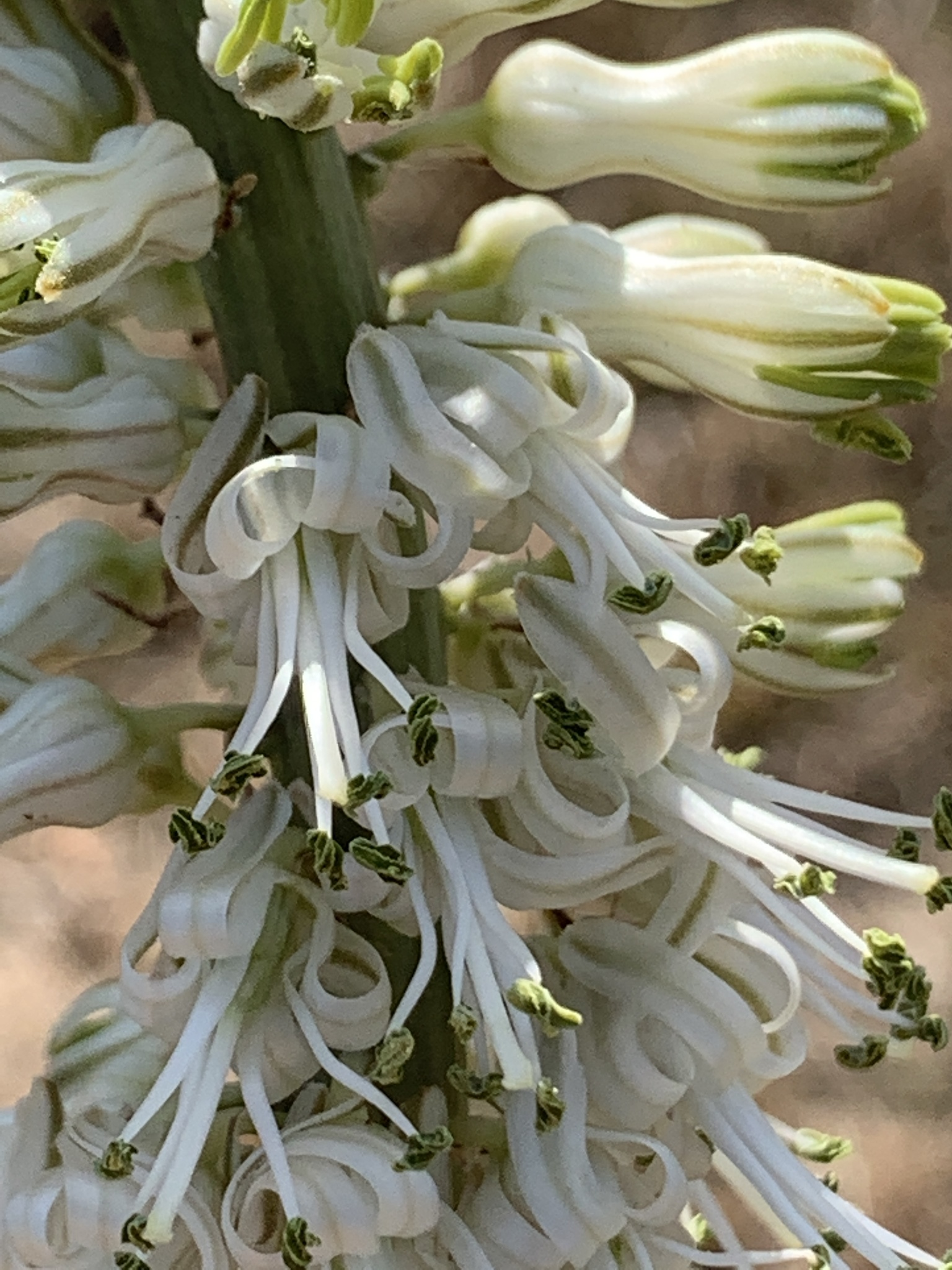

Scientific classification
- Kingdom: Plantae
- Clade: Tracheophytes
- Clade: Angiosperms
- Clade: Monocots
- Order: Asparagales
- Family: Asparagaceae
- Subfamily: Scilloideae
- Genus: Drimia
- Species: D. capensis

Binomial name
- Drimia capensis (Burm.f.) Wijnands

Synonyms
- Drimia forsteri (Baker) Oberm.; Scilla capensis Burm.f.; Urginea forsteri Baker

= Drimia capensis =

Species of flowering plant

Drimia capensis ("Maerman") is a species of geophytic flowering plant in the family Asparagaceae, subfamily Scilloideae, indigenous to the south-western parts of South Africa.

== Description ==
A geophytic perennial, that can reach 1–2 meters in height with their flower-stems. The partially subterranean bulb is relatively large.

The grey leaves are erect, rounded lanceolate and long (30–50 cm). The leaf margins can be mildly undulating.

The flowers appear on a long, slender raceme, in November to March, after the leaves are already dry. The flowers are pale yellow-cream with green midribs. The seed capsules are trilocular.

== Distribution and habitat ==
Drimia capensis grows across the southern Cape, South Africa. It occurs from the Namaqualand in the west, southwards into the Overberg region, and eastwards as far as Port Elizabeth.

Its preferred habitat is reddish sand or clay, as well as limestone-derived soils.
