= Drimia indica =

- In Maharashtra, India

Scientific classification
- Kingdom: Plantae
- Clade: Tracheophytes
- Clade: Angiosperms
- Clade: Monocots
- Order: Asparagales
- Family: Asparagaceae
- Subfamily: Scilloideae
- Genus: Drimia
- Species: D. indica

Binomial name
- Drimia indica (Roxb.) Jessop

Synonyms
- Synonymy: Aletris littoralis J.Koenig ex Steud. (1840); Anthericum hyacinthoides Willd. ex Kunth (1843); Erythronium hyacinthoides Royle (1840); Erythronium indicum Rottler ex Spreng. (1825), pro syn.; Indurgia indica (Roxb.) Speta (2001); Ledebouria maculata Dalzell (1850); Melanthium hyacinthoides Royle (1839); Scilla indica Roxb. in Fl. Ind., ed. 1832. 2: 147 (1832); Thuranthos indicus (Roxb.) Speta in Phyton (Horn) 38: 84 (1998); Thuranthos wightianus (Hook.f.) Speta (1998); Urginea coromandeliana Hook.f. (1892), nom. illeg.; Urginea indica (Roxb.) Kunth in Enum. Pl. 4: 333 (1843); Urginea wightiana Hook.f. (1892)

Species of flowering plant

Drimia indica is a species of flowering plant in the family Asparagaceae. It is a bulbous geophyte native to the Indian subcontinent and Indochina.

== Description ==
Drimia indica is a perennial herbaceous flowering plant which grows from bulbs. It has long leaves, typically 15–30 cm long by 1–2.5 cm wide, but sometimes considerably longer. The flowers, which appear in spring before the leaves, are borne in racemes on a leafless stem (scape) up to 60 cm long. The flowers are widely spaced on the raceme, which is 15–31 cm long, and are carried on stalks (pedicels) 2.5–4 cm long. Individual flowers are bell-shaped. The six pale brown tepals have white margins. The 6–7 cm long stamens have yellow anthers and filaments which are flattened at the base. Between six and nine seeds are produced in a capsule which is 1.5–1.8 cm long. Individual seeds are black and shaped like flattened ellipsoids.

== Distribution ==
D. indica ranges through the Indian subcontinent, from Pakistan and the Himalayas to Sri Lanka, and eastwards to Myanmar, Thailand, and Vietnam. Populations in southern and southeastern Africa are now considered a separate species, Drimia zambesiaca.

== Uses ==
D. indica is used as a substitute for the "true squill", Drimia maritima, in traditional medicine.
