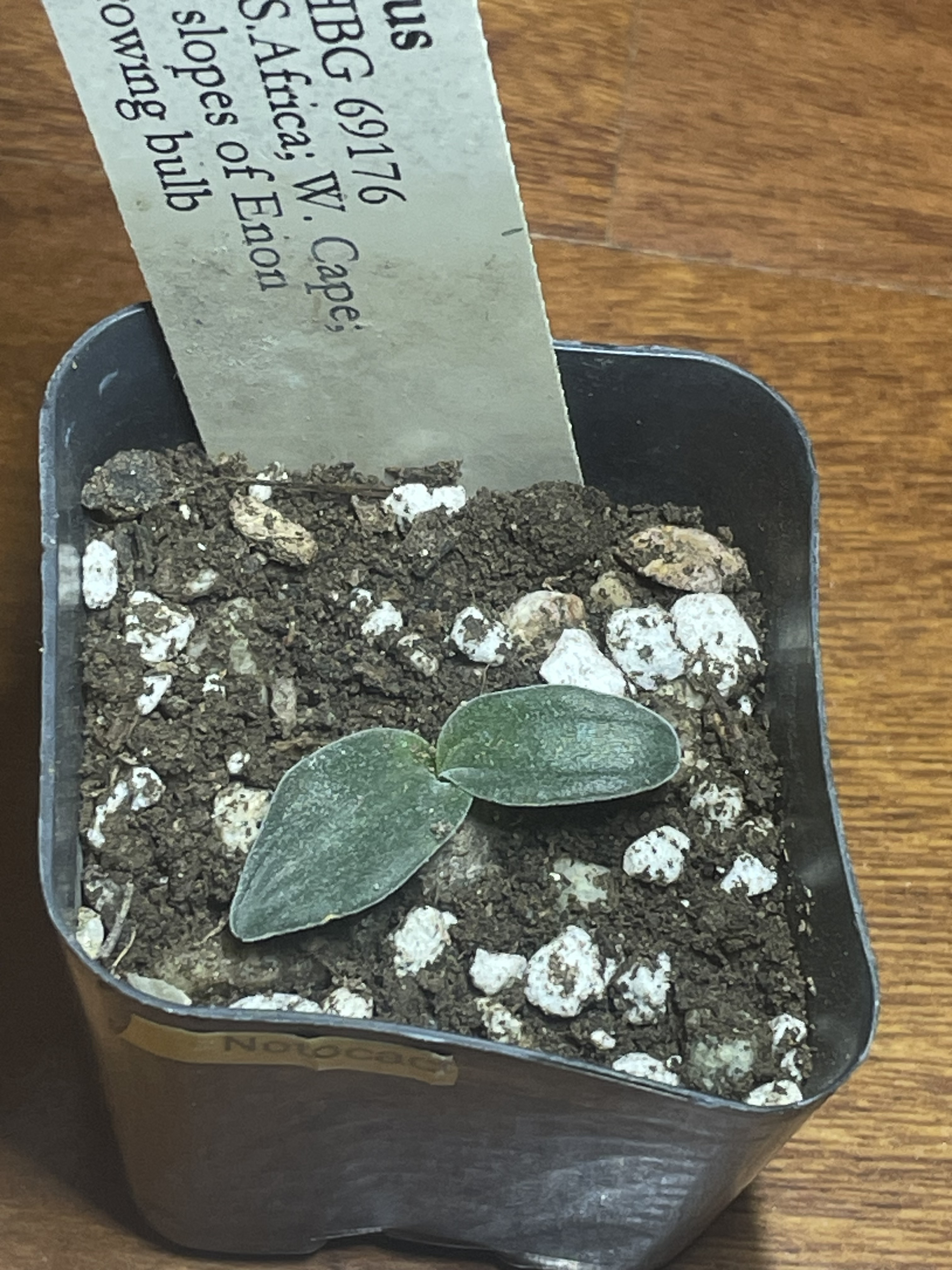

Scientific classification
- Kingdom: Plantae
- Clade: Tracheophytes
- Clade: Angiosperms
- Clade: Monocots
- Order: Asparagales
- Family: Asparagaceae
- Subfamily: Scilloideae
- Genus: Drimia
- Species: D. platyphylla

Binomial name
- Drimia platyphylla (B.Nord.) J.C.Manning & Goldblatt

= Drimia platyphylla =

Species of plant

Dirmia platyphylla is a bulbus plant from South Africa, specifically the Cape Provinces, and Namibia. It was first described in 2014 as Rhadamanthus platyphyllus though its likely that this plant was described earlier as the Huntington Library and Botanical Gardens has offered this plant for sale on their 2007 ISI catalogue.

== Description ==
Dirmia platyphylla is a small bulb plant from South Africa. Its one of the plants sometimes seen in the backgrounds of photos of Conophytum and other Azioceae plants in habitat in South Africa. The leaves are small, and grayish bule, and this plant is a winter grower.
