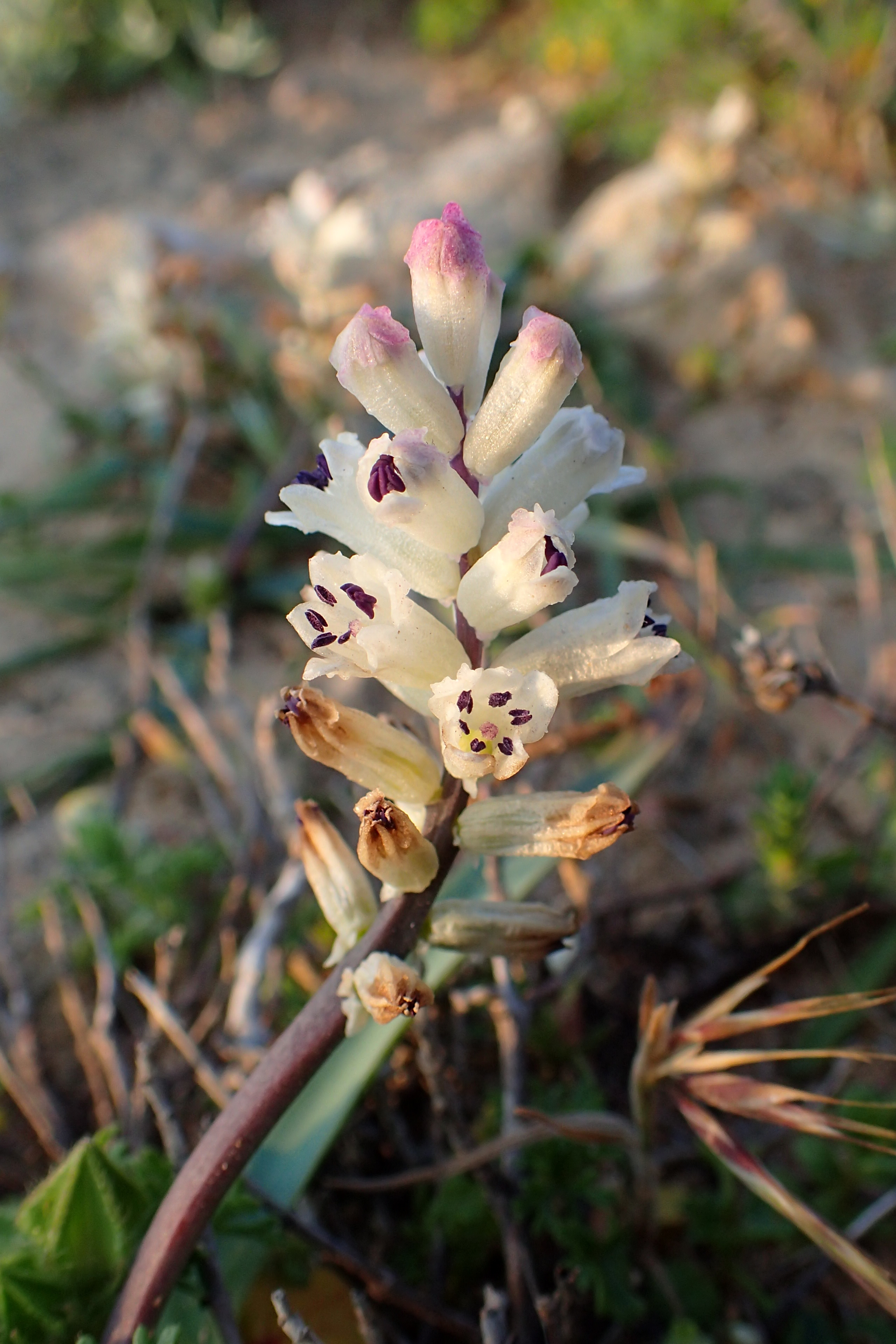
- Bellevalia nivalis

Scientific classification
- Kingdom: Plantae
- Clade: Tracheophytes
- Clade: Angiosperms
- Clade: Monocots
- Order: Asparagales
- Family: Asparagaceae
- Subfamily: Scilloideae
- Genus: Bellevalia; Lapeyr. 1808, conserved name, not Scop. 1777 (Verbenaceae) nor Delile Endl. 1836 (Potamogetonaceae)

Synonyms
- Amphibolis Schott & Kotschy in C.G.T.Kotschy. 1858, illegitimate homonym, not C. Agardh 1822; Borboya Raf.; Busbequia Salisb.; Foxia Parl.; Rytidolobus Dulac; Strangweja Bertol.

= Bellevalia =

Genus of flowering plants

Bellevalia is a genus of flowering plants in the family Asparagaceae, subfamily Scilloideae. It was first described as a genus in 1808.

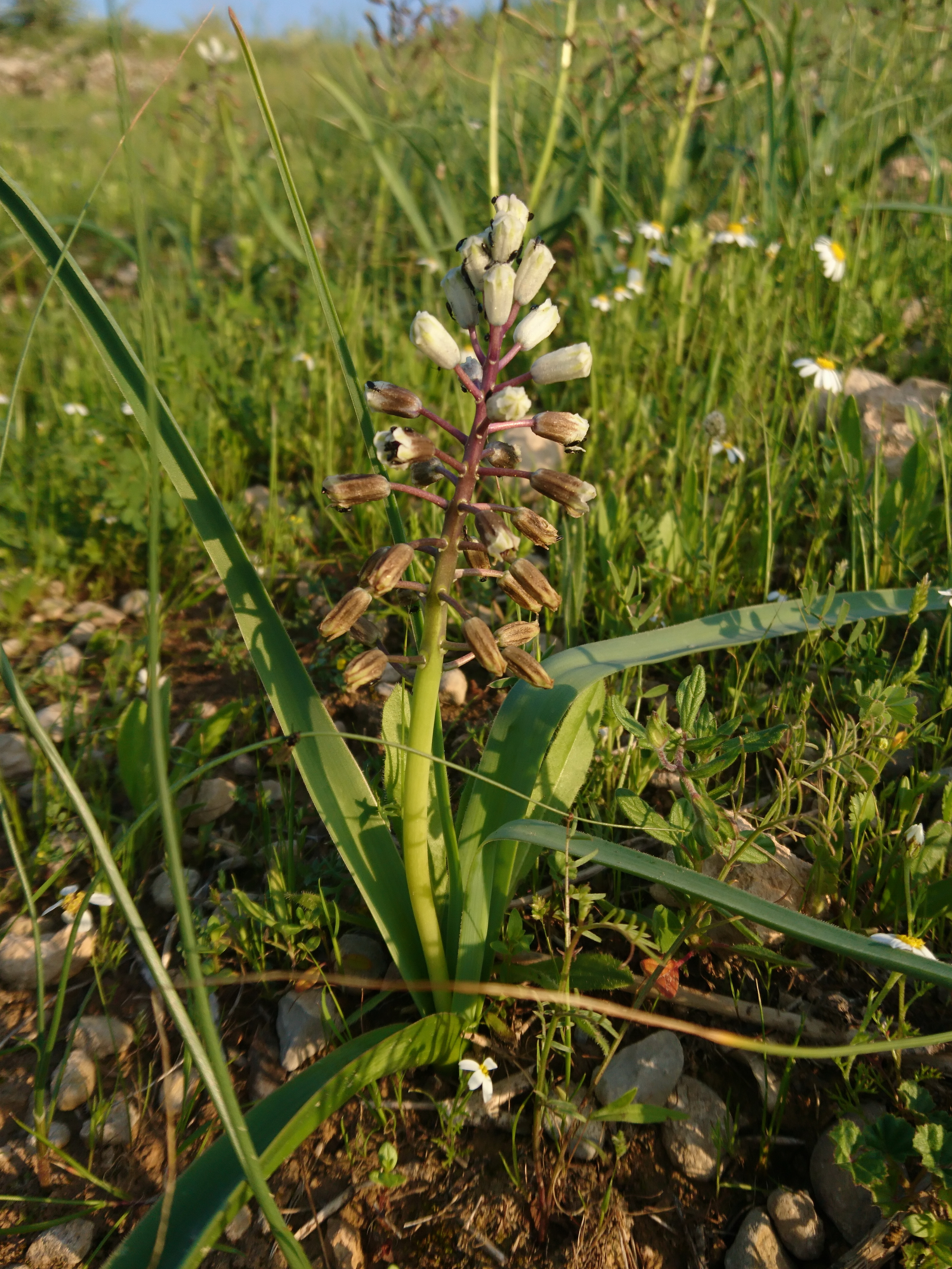
Wild Bellevalia in Behbahan

It includes 81 species native to the Mediterranean Basin of North Africa, southern Europe, and Western Asia, as well as Ukraine, southern European Russia, the Caucasus, and western and Central Asia as far as Uzbekistan, Tajikistan, and Pakistan.

== Description ==
Bellevalia species are perennial herbaceous plants. As geophytes, they form bulbs with a membranous sheath ("tunic"). The simple, parallel-veined leaves are basal. Grape-like inflorescences grow terminally on smooth cylindrical flower stems. The numerous flowers are located in the axils of small, membranous bracts. The hermaphroditic flowers are triple. The six identically shaped bracts are one-third to one-half their length and deformed tubular, bell-shaped or funnel-shaped in form. The color of the bracts ranges from white to cream to brown or more rarely from blue to purple. The fruit capsule is triangular in cross section with winged edges. The seeds are more or less spherical, rarely elongated and glossy.

== Taxonomy ==
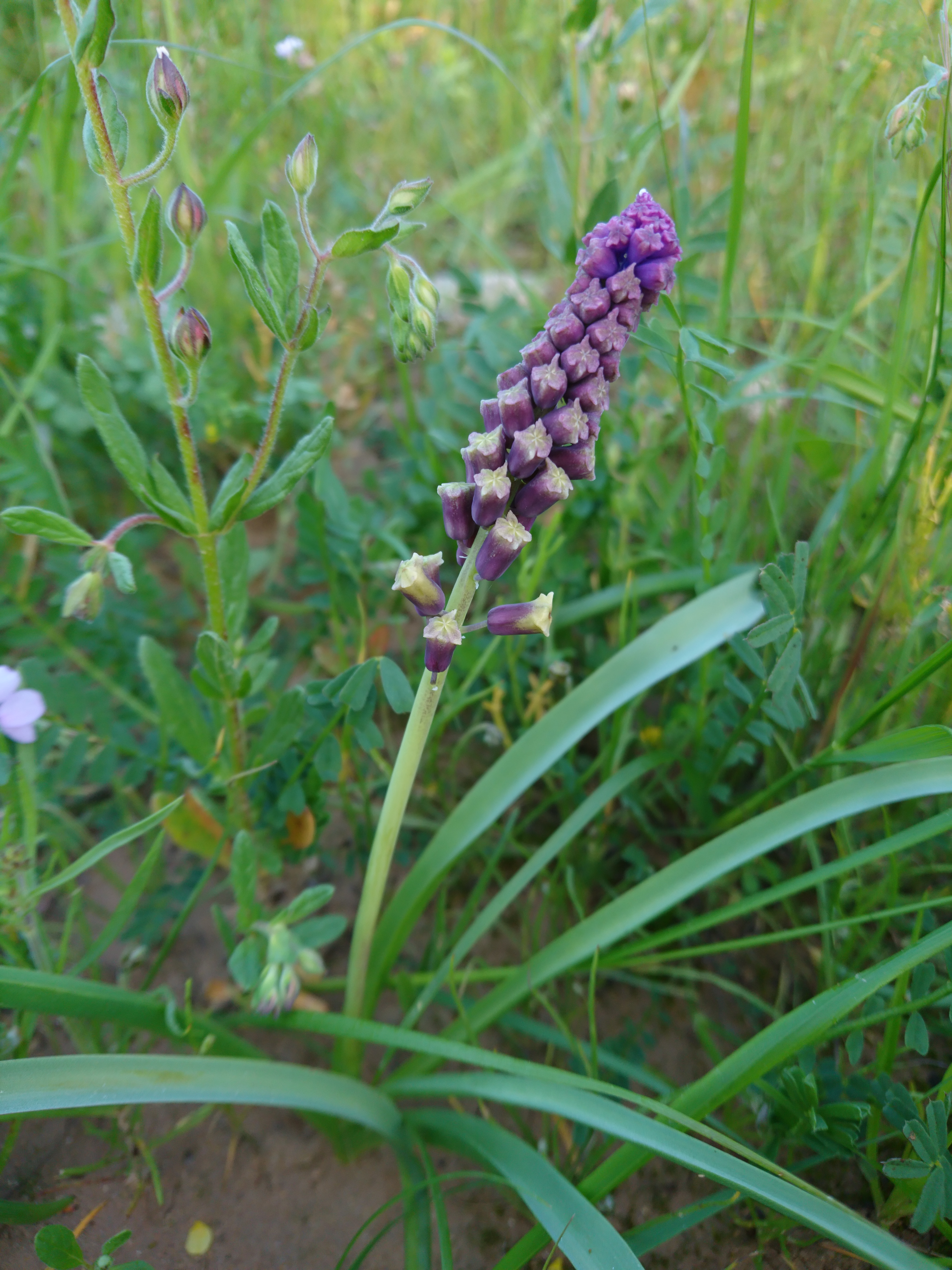
Wild Bellevalia in Behbahan

The genus Bellevalia was first described in 1808 by Philippe-Isidore Picot de Lapeyrouse. The genus name honors the French botanist Pierre Richer de Belleval (1564-1632). A synonym for Bellevalia is Strangweja Bertol. The homonym genus Bellevalia Roem. & Schult. is a synonym of the genus Richeria Vahl from the family Phyllanthaceae.

Some species formerly belonged to the genus Hyacinthus. The genus Bellevalia is placed in the tribe Hyacintheae in the subfamily Scilloideae within the family Asparagaceae.

=== Species ===
81 species are accepted.

1. Bellevalia anatolica B.Mathew & Özhatay
2. Bellevalia assadii Wendelbo
3. Bellevalia aucheri (Baker) Losinsk.
4. Bellevalia bayburtensis Sefali & Yıldırım
5. Bellevalia behcetii Pinar, Eroglu & Fidan
6. Bellevalia brevipedicellata Turrill
7. Bellevalia chrisii Yıldırım & B.Sahin
8. Bellevalia ciliata (Cirillo) T.Nees
9. Bellevalia clusiana Griseb.
10. Bellevalia crassa Wendelbo
11. Bellevalia cyanopoda Wendelbo
12. Bellevalia cyrenaica Maire & Weiller
13. Bellevalia decolorans Bornm.
14. Bellevalia densiflora Boiss.
15. Bellevalia desertorum Eig & Feinbrun
16. Bellevalia douinii Pabot & Mouterde
17. Bellevalia dubia (Guss.) Schult. & Schult.f.
18. Bellevalia edirnensis Özhatay & B.Mathew
19. Bellevalia eigii Feinbrun
20. Bellevalia feinbruniae Freitag & Wendelbo
21. Bellevalia flexuosa Boiss.
22. Bellevalia fominii Woronow
23. Bellevalia galitensis Bocchieri & Mossa
24. Bellevalia glauca (Lindl.) Kunth
25. Bellevalia gracilis Feinbrun
26. Bellevalia guneriana Tugay & Armağan
27. Bellevalia hakkariensis Fırat
28. Bellevalia hermonis Mouterde
29. Bellevalia heweri Wendelbo
30. Bellevalia hyacinthoides (Bertol.) K.Perss. & Wendelbo
31. Bellevalia juliana Bareka, Turland & Kamari
32. Bellevalia koeiei Rech.f.
33. Bellevalia konyaensis Tugay & Ulukuş
34. Bellevalia koyuncui Karabacak & Yıldırım
35. Bellevalia kurdica Fırat
36. Bellevalia kurdistanica Feinbrun
37. Bellevalia leucantha K.Perss.
38. Bellevalia longipes Post
39. Bellevalia longistyla (Miscz.) Grossh.
40. Bellevalia lypskyi (Miscz.) Wulff.
41. Bellevalia macrobotrys Boiss.
42. Bellevalia malatyaensis Uzunh. & H.Duman
43. Bellevalia mathewii Özhatay & Koçak
44. Bellevalia mauritanica Pomel
45. Bellevalia modesta Wendelbo
46. Bellevalia montana (K.Koch) Boiss., syns Bellevalia albana Woronow, Bellevalia makuensis Woronow ex Grossh., Bellevalia wilhelmsii (Steven) Woronow
47. Bellevalia mosheovii Feinbrun
48. Bellevalia multicolor Wendelbo
49. Bellevalia nivalis Boiss. & Kotschy
50. Bellevalia olivieri (Baker) Wendelbo, syn. Bellevalia latifolia Feinbrun
51. Bellevalia palmyrensis Feinbrun
52. Bellevalia paradoxa (Fisch. & C.A.Mey.) Boiss., syn. Bellevalia pycnantha (K.Koch) Losinsk.
53. Bellevalia parva Wendelbo
54. Bellevalia pseudofominii Özhatay & E.Kaya
55. Bellevalia pseudolongipes Karabacak & Yıldırım
56. Bellevalia rixii Wendelbo
57. Bellevalia romana (L.) Sweet
58. Bellevalia salah-eidii Täckh. & Boulos
59. Bellevalia sasonii Fidan
60. Bellevalia saviczii Woronow
61. Bellevalia sessiliflora (Viv.) Kunth
62. Bellevalia shiraziana Parsa
63. Bellevalia siirtensis Firat
64. Bellevalia sirnakensis (Yıld.) Yıld.
65. Bellevalia sitiaca Kypriotakis & Tzanoud.
66. Bellevalia speciosa Woronow ex Grossh., syn. Bellevalia sarmatica (Pall. ex Georgi) Woronow
67. Bellevalia spicata (Raf.) Boiss.
68. Bellevalia stepporum Feinbrun
69. Bellevalia tabriziana Turrill
70. Bellevalia tauri Feinbrun
71. Bellevalia trifoliata (Ten.) Kunth
72. Bellevalia tristis Bornm.
73. Bellevalia turcica Pınar & Eroğlu
74. Bellevalia turkestanica Franch., syn. Bellevalia atroviolacea Regel
75. Bellevalia undulatifolia Özhatay, Gürdal & E.Kaya
76. Bellevalia validicarpa Ponert
77. Bellevalia vuralii B.Sahin & Aslan
78. Bellevalia warburgii Feinbrun
79. Bellevalia webbiana Parl.
80. Bellevalia wendelboi Maassoumi & Jafari
81. Bellevalia zoharyi Feinbrun

Recently described species include:

- Bellevalia iranica Alipour, Majidi, & Eker described in 2025 from Iran

Species formerly included

moved to Alrawia, Althenia, Hyacinthella, and Muscari

1. B. aleppica - Hyacinthella nervosa
2. B. aperta - Muscari armeniacum
3. B. atchleyi - Hyacinthella leucophaea subsp. atchleyi
4. B. australis - Althenia filiformis var. barrandonii
5. B. azurea - Muscari azureum
6. B. bellii - Alrawia bellii
7. B. bouriana - Muscari comosum
8. B. calandriniana - Muscari comosum
9. B. caucasica - Muscari caucasicum
10. B. coelestis - Muscari coeleste
11. B. coerulea - Pseudomuscari coeruleum
12. B. comosa - Muscari comosum
13. B. cupaniana - Muscari gussonei
14. B. dalmatica - Hyacinthella dalmatica
15. B. dichroa - Alrawia bellii
16. B. fontanesii - Muscari maritimum
17. B. forniculata - Muscari forniculatum
18. B. fuliginosa - Muscari fuliginosum
19. B. graeca - Muscari comosum
20. B. graminifolia - Muscari comosum
21. B. haynei - Hyacinthella nervosa
22. B. heldreichii - Hyacinthella heldreichii
23. B. hispida - Hyacinthella hispida
24. B. holzmannii - Muscari comosum
25. B. leucophaea - Hyacinthella leucophaea
26. B. lineata - Hyacinthella lineata
27. B. longipes (Boiss.) Bornm. 1939 not Post 1895 - Muscari longipes
28. B. maritima - Muscari maritimum
29. B. maritima subsp. weissii - Muscari weissii
30. B. micrantha - Hyacinthella micrantha
31. B. millingenii - Hyacinthella millingenii
32. B. monophylla - Muscari latifolium
33. B. muscarioides - Muscari latifolium
34. B. nervosa - Hyacinthella nervosa
35. B. oxycarpa - Alrawia bellii
36. B. pallens - Muscari pallens
37. B. persica - Hyacinthella persica
38. B. pharmacusana - Muscari comosum
39. B. pinardii - Muscari comosum
40. B. pseudomuscari - Muscari pseudomuscari
41. B. sartoriana - Muscari comosum
42. B. tenuiflora - Muscari tenuiflora
43. B. tenuiflora subsp. constricta - Muscari comosum
44. B. theraea - Muscari weissii
45. B. turkewiczii - Muscari coeleste
46. B. weissii - Muscari weissii

== Bibliography ==
- S. I. Ali: Flora of Pakistan. Volume 214: Hyacinthaceae. University of Karachi, Department of Botany, Karachi 2005, S. 2, Bellevalia online
- GRIN
- Gustav Heynhold: Nomenclator botanicus hortensis: Oder, Alphabetische und synonymische Aufzählung der in den Gärten Europa's Cultivirten Gewächse, nebst Angabe ihres Autors, ihres Vaterlandes, ihrer Dauer und Cultur. Band 2. Arnoldische Buchhandlung, Dresden und Leipzig 1846, p. 64
- Cristian Brullo, Salvatore Brullo, S. Pasta: Bellevalia pelagica (Hyacinthaceae), a new species from the Islet of Lampione (Pelagian Archipelag, Sicily). In: Edinburgh Journal of Botany. vol. 66, No. 1, 2009, p. 65–75
- A. Jafari, A. A. Maassoumi: A New Species of Bellevalia (Liliaceae/Hyacinthaceae) from Iran. In: Edinburgh Journal of Botany. vol 65, No. 3, 2008, p. 469–473
