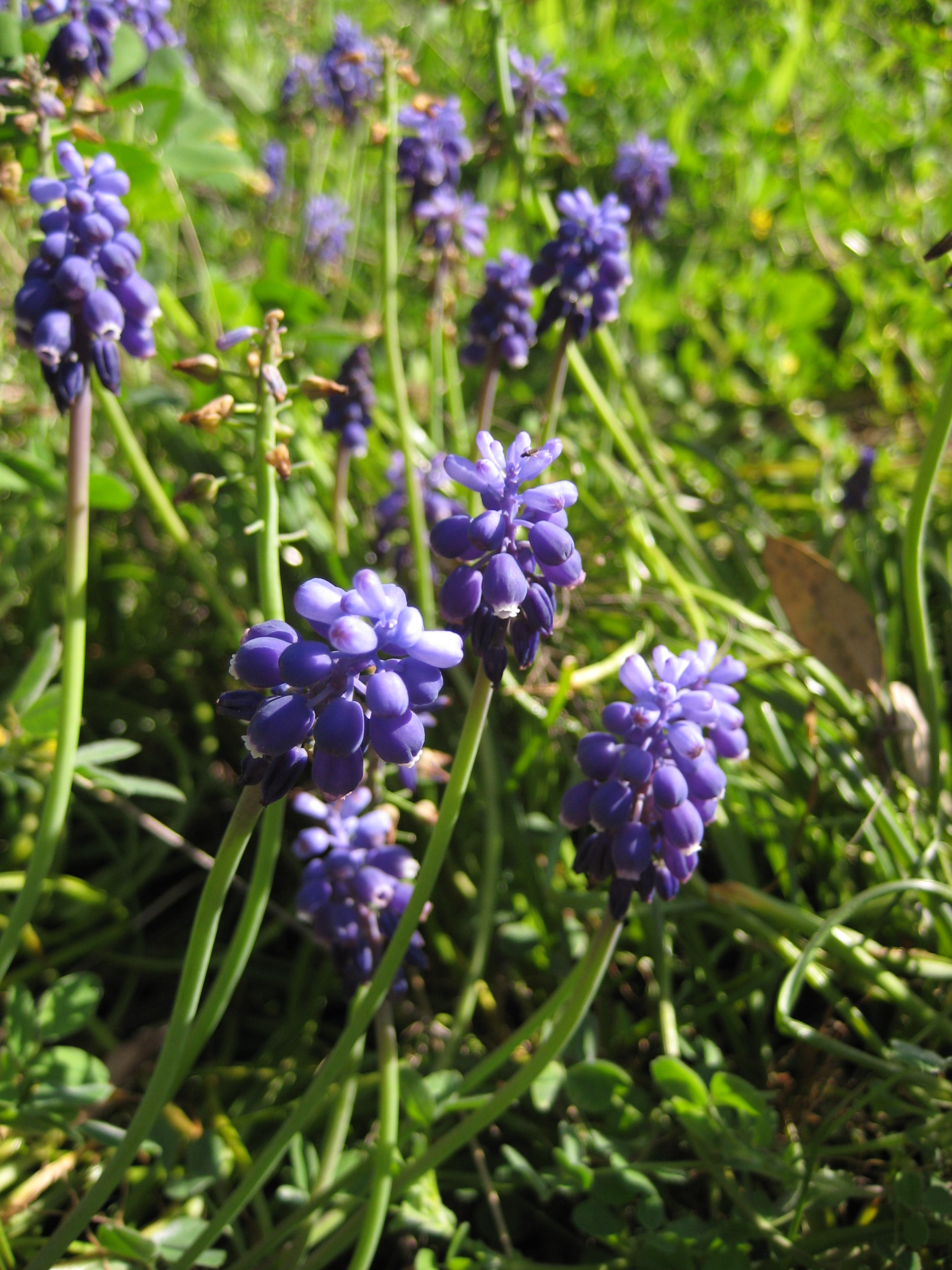
- Naturalized in Austin, Texas.

Scientific classification
- Kingdom: Plantae
- Clade: Tracheophytes
- Clade: Angiosperms
- Clade: Monocots
- Order: Asparagales
- Family: Asparagaceae
- Subfamily: Scilloideae
- Genus: Muscari
- Subgenus: Muscari subg. Muscari
- Species: M. botryoides

Binomial name
- Muscari botryoides (L.) Mill.

Synonyms
- Hyacinthus botryoides L.

= Muscari botryoides =

Species of plant in the asparagus family

Muscari botryoides is a bulbous perennial plant of the genus Muscari and one of a number of species in the genus sold as grape hyacinth. It is sometimes grown as an ornamental plant.

The flowers are close together, and are almost totally round. The lower fertile flowers point downwards, while upper ones, usually paler and sterile, point upwards. The flowers are bright blue with white lobes at the end in the wild species, but other colours are available, including white. M. botryoides is originally from central and south-eastern Europe, growing in open woodland and mountain meadows.

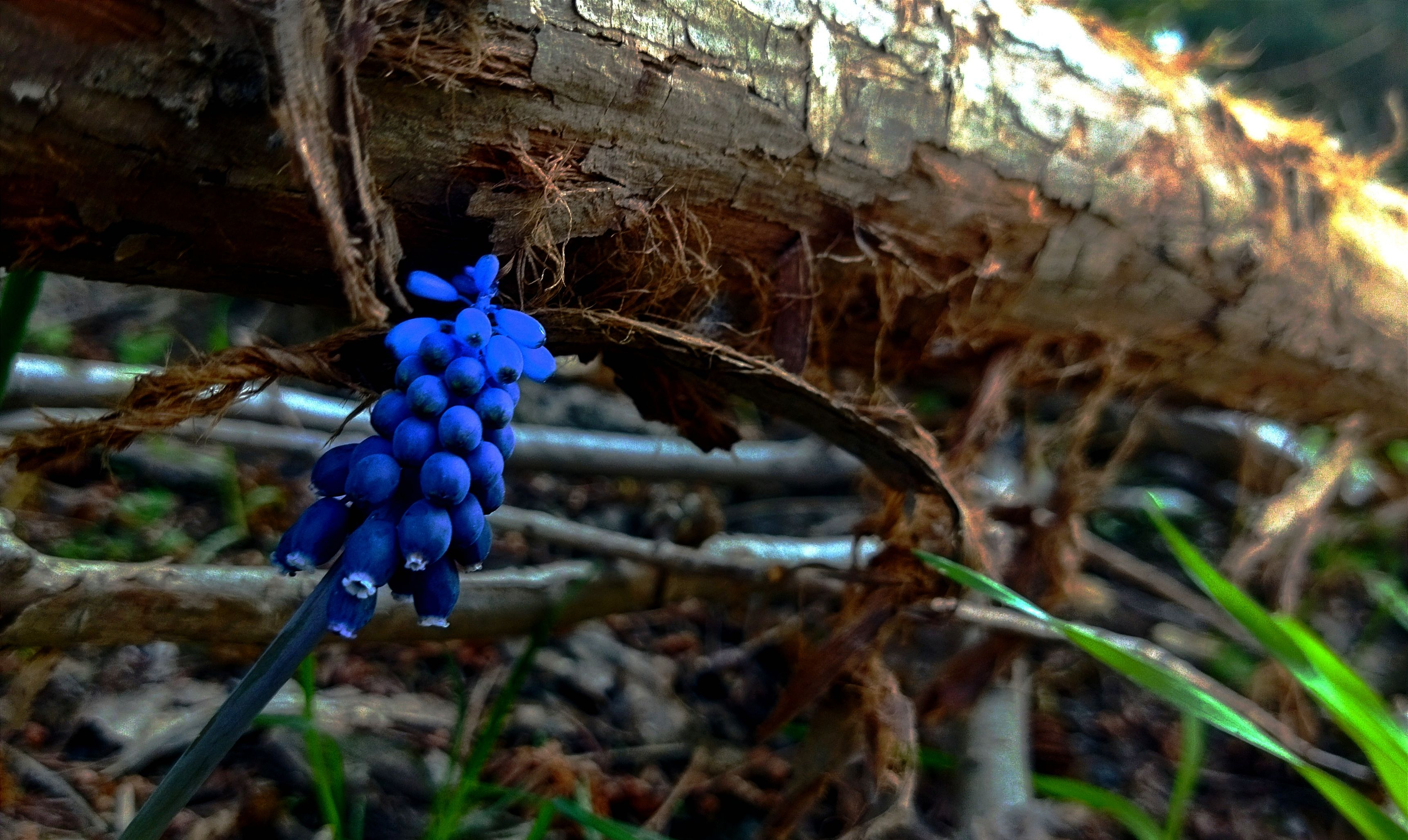
In Tashkent Botanical Garden

The name botryoides is derived from the appearance of a miniature cluster of grapes. M. botryoides is said to be much less invasive than the related M. neglectum, nevertheless both species are listed as invasive in Tennessee.
