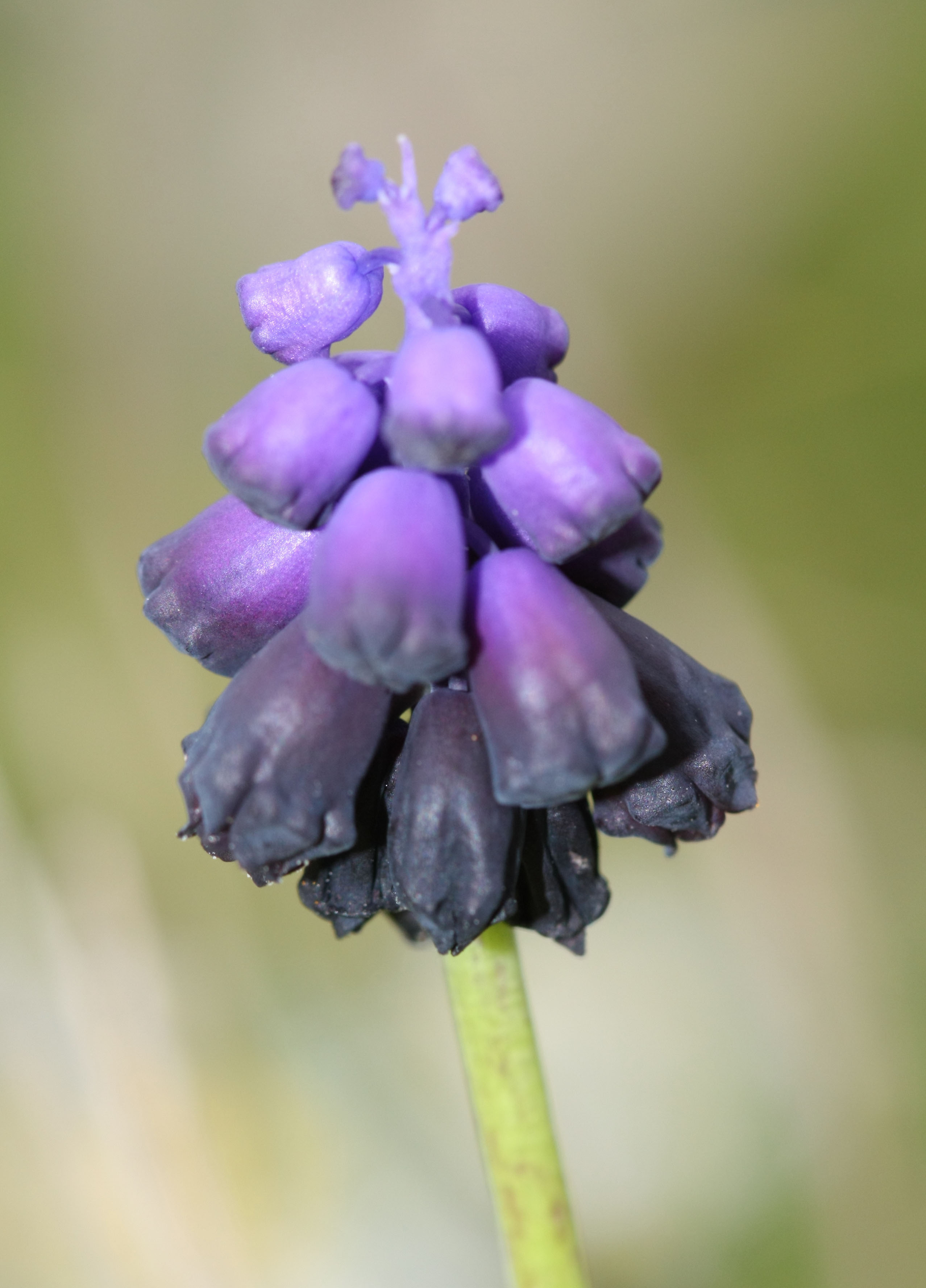

Scientific classification
- Kingdom: Plantae
- Clade: Tracheophytes
- Clade: Angiosperms
- Clade: Monocots
- Order: Asparagales
- Family: Asparagaceae
- Subfamily: Scilloideae
- Genus: Muscari
- Subgenus: Muscari subg. Muscari
- Species: M. commutatum

Binomial name
- Muscari commutatum Guss.

= Muscari commutatum =

Species of plant

Muscari commutatum is a species of perennial herb in the family Asparagaceae. They have a self-supporting growth form and simple, broad leaves and dry fruit.

== Sources ==
This article incorporates text from a free content work. Licensed under CC0 (license statement/permission). Text taken from Muscari commutatum. Encyclopedia of Life.
