= Pierre Richer de Belleval =

French botanist

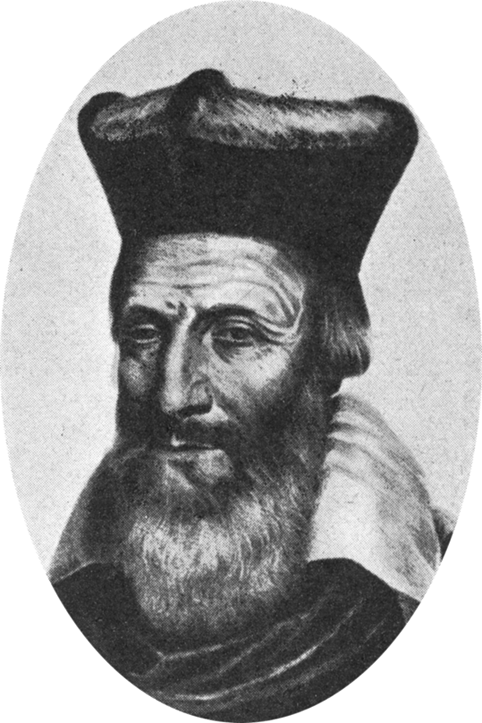
Pierre Richer de Belleval.

Pierre Richer de Belleval (1564 – November 17, 1632), was a French botanist. He is considered the father of scientific botany. The standard author abbreviation Rich.Bell. is used to indicate this person as the author when citing a botanical name.

Richer de Belleval was born in Châlons-en-Champagne. His father was N. Richer or Richier. He first went to Montpellier to study medicine in 1584, but ended up receiving his MD from Avignon in 1587. In 1587, immediately after completing his M.D., Belleval married the daughter of a deceased seigneur de Prades (who had enriched himself by trade and purchased the estate) near Montpellier. There was a considerable dowry, and it is clear that this personal estate helped to support Belleval throughout his life.

Between 1587 and 1593 he practiced medicine in Avignon (and possibly Comtat) and then in Pezenas. His services towards the people of Pezenas during an epidemic disorder, brought him under the protection of the governor of Languedoc, Henri de Montmorency. Then, Henry IV of France appointed Belleval as his personal physician (although he remained in Montpellier and was not at the court). Belleval also served as a personal physician of Louis XIII. There are documented financial favors that he received from Henry.

In 1593 he was appointed to the new royal chair of anatomy and botanical studies of Montpellier. Two years later, in 1595, he received his doctorate in medicine in Montpellier. In 1593 Henry IV asked him to create a botanical garden in Montpellier following the model of the gardens created in Padoua in 1545. Belleval devoted all of his time and money to the Jardin des plantes de Montpellier, which was the first botanical garden in France. The garden contained the King's Garden (medicinal plants), the Queen's Garden (mountain plants from Languedoc and elsewhere) and the King's Square (plants of purely botanical interest). The goal was to have a garden for conducting experiments related to both medicine and agriculture. Unfortunately, a civil war and a siege of the city destroyed the garden in 1622 and Pierre Richer de Belleval had to recreate the garden from scratch and continued working on this until his death at Montpellier. His nephew accomplished the re-establishment of the garden on a more extensive scale.

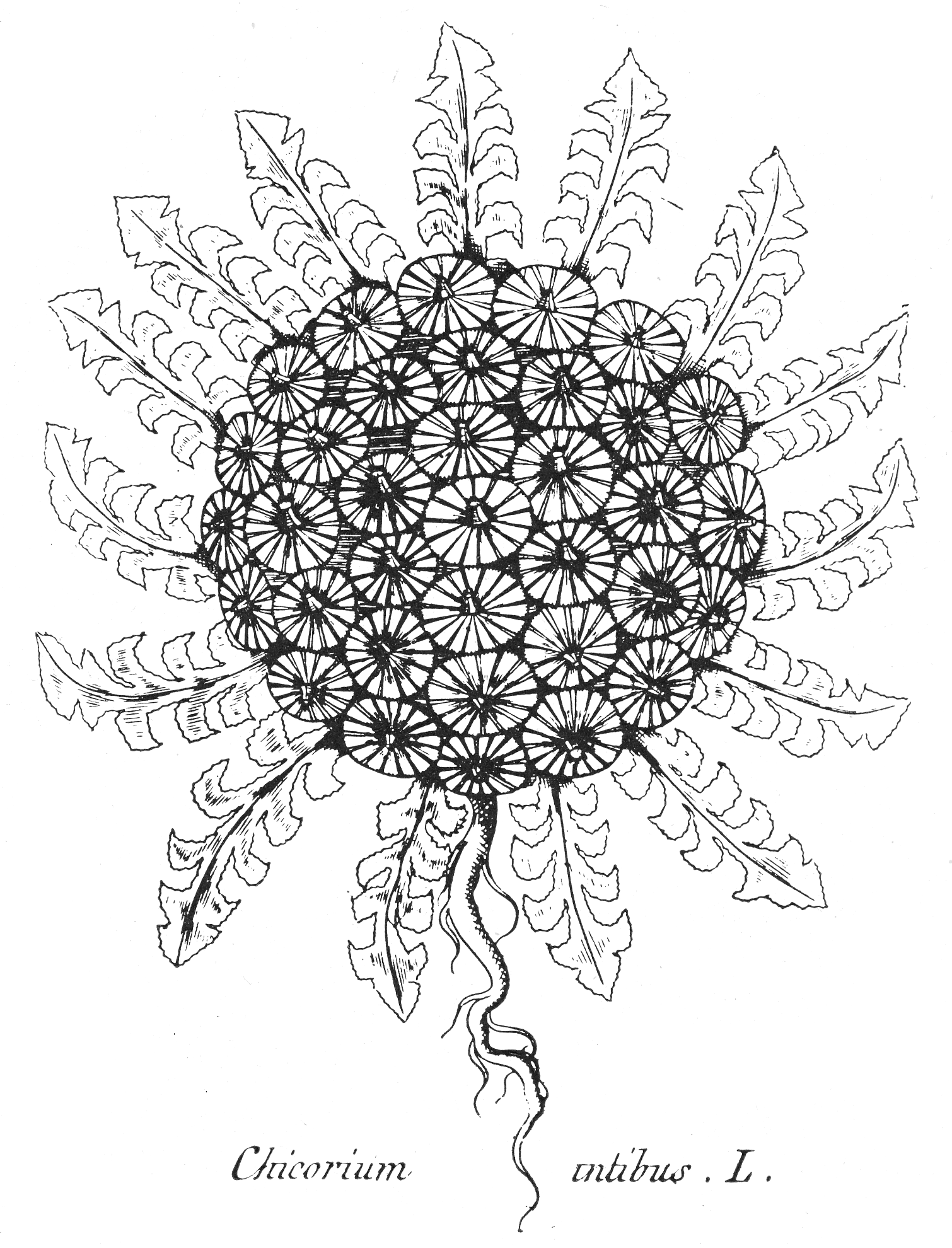
Chicorium Intybus, from the publication Démonstrations élémentaires de botanique by Gilibert (1796).

Richer de Belleval published a catalog of the garden in 1598 and a French treatise in 1605, recommending an inquiry into the native plants of Languedoc. This last was accompanied by five plates, intended as a sample of a future work. Antoine Gouarin produced some 400 plates for 'Flore de Languedoc'. Richer de Belleval did not live to see the work published and the plates remained neglected in the hands of Gouarin's family. The plates were finally published much later, in 1796 after Gilibert obtained the plates. The pamphlets were republished in 1785 by Broussonet.

The genus Bellevalia Lapeyr., in the family Asparagaceae, is named in his honour.

== Online work ==
- Opuscules. Paris, 1785.
