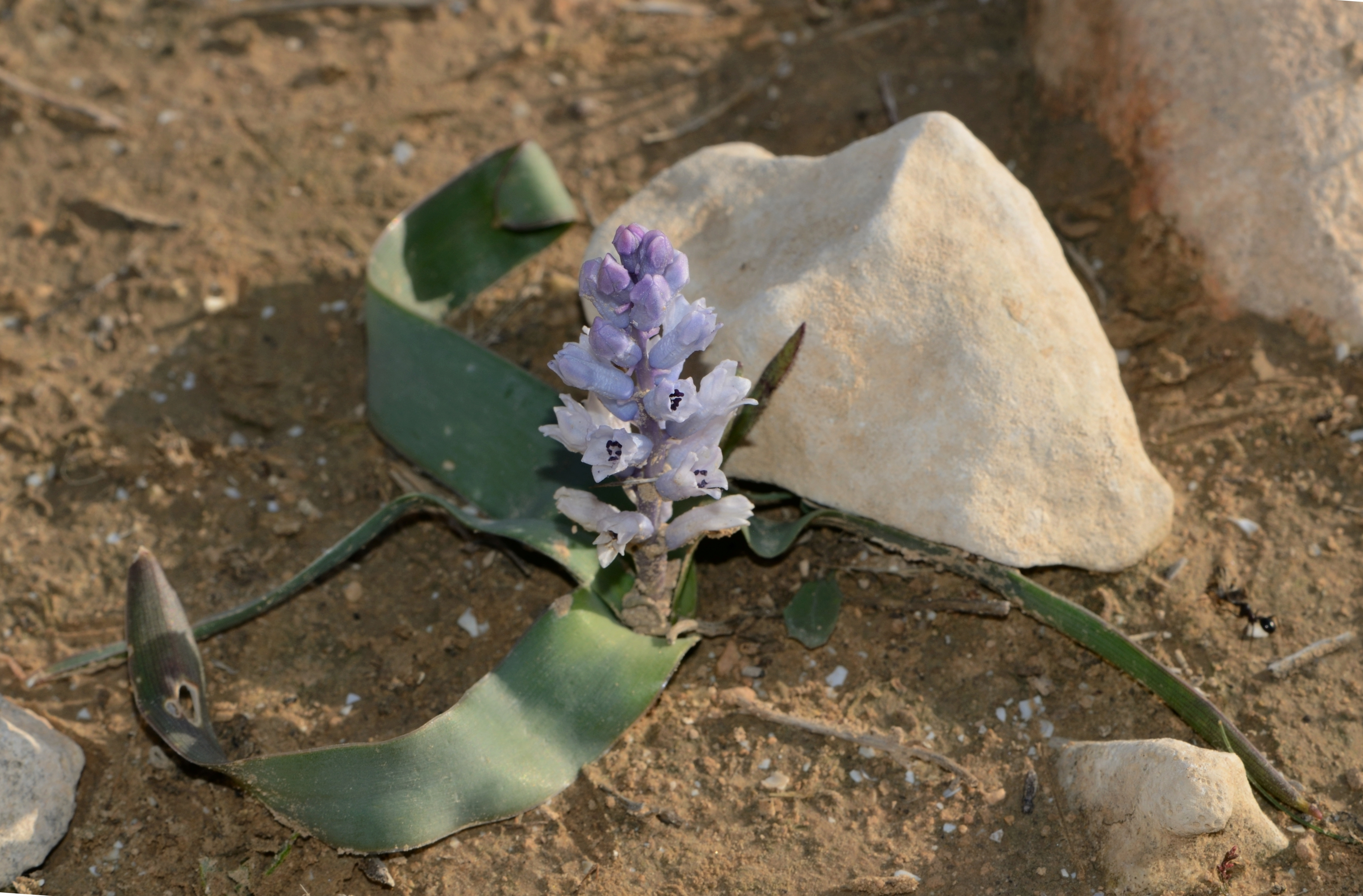

Scientific classification
- Kingdom: Plantae
- Clade: Tracheophytes
- Clade: Angiosperms
- Clade: Monocots
- Order: Asparagales
- Family: Asparagaceae
- Subfamily: Scilloideae
- Genus: Bellevalia
- Species: B. desertorum

Binomial name
- Bellevalia desertorum Eig & Feinbrun

= Bellevalia desertorum =

Species of flowering plant

Bellevalia desertorum is a species of flowering plant in the family Asparagaceae, native to Israel, Jordan and the Sinai Peninsula.
