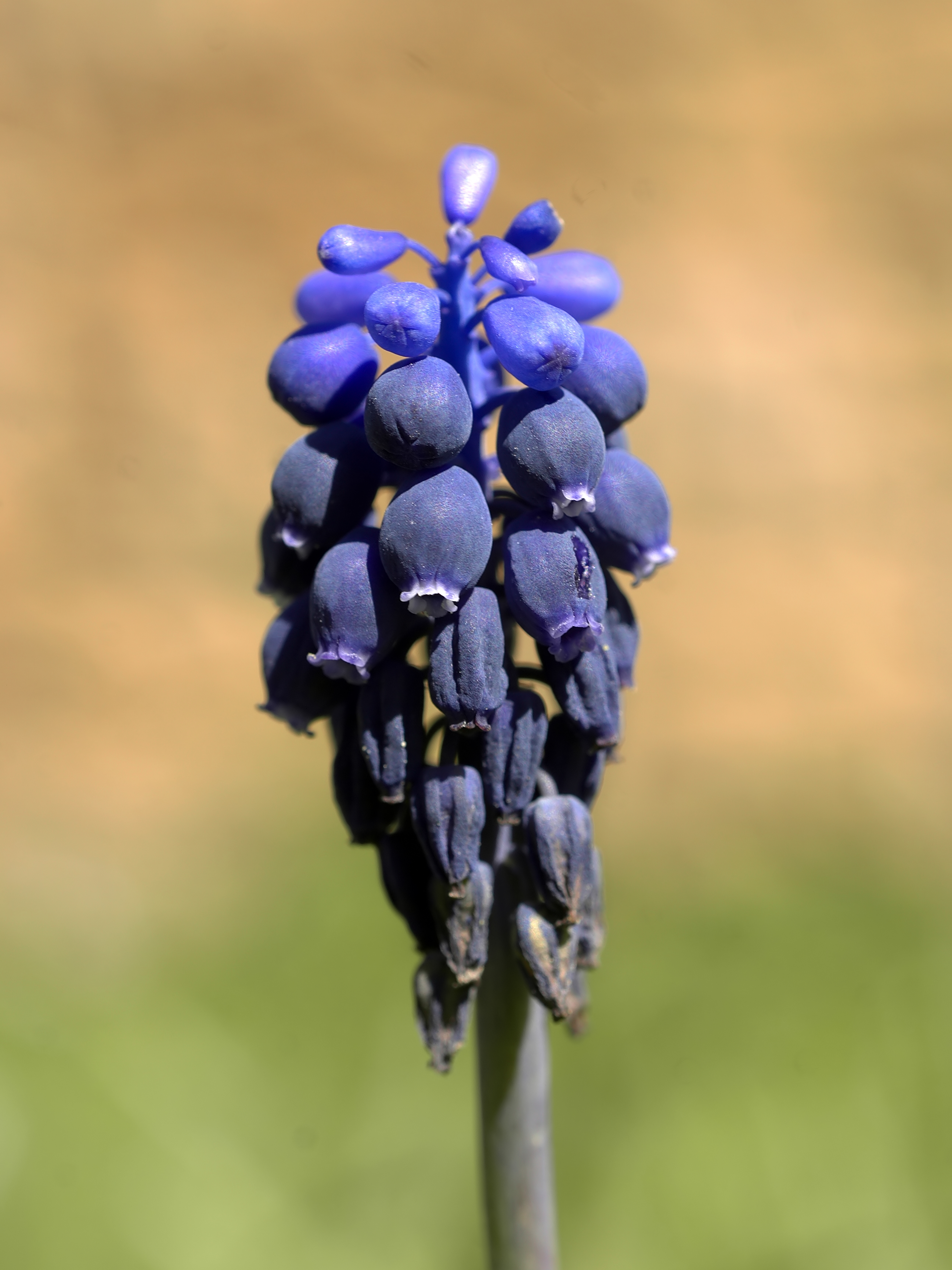

Scientific classification
- Kingdom: Plantae
- Clade: Tracheophytes
- Clade: Angiosperms
- Clade: Monocots
- Order: Asparagales
- Family: Asparagaceae
- Subfamily: Scilloideae
- Genus: Muscari
- Subgenus: Muscari subg. Muscari
- Species: M. neglectum

Binomial name
- Muscari neglectum Guss. ex Ten. & Sangiov.

Synonyms
- Synonymy: Botryanthus breviscapus Tod.; Botryanthus mandraliscae Lojac.; Botryanthus mordoanus (Heldr.) Nyman; Botryanthus neglectus (Guss. ex Ten. & Sangiov.) Kunth; Botryanthus neglectus subsp. odorus O.Bolòs & Vigo; Botryanthus neglectus var. speciosa (Marches.) Nyman; Botryanthus odorus Kunth; Botryanthus racemosus (L.) Fourr.; Botryanthus saulii Jaub. & Spach; Botryanthus speciosus (Marches.) Nyman; Etheiranthus jacquinii Kostel.; Eubotrys odorata Raf.; Hyacinthus juncifolius Lam.; Hyacinthus neglectus (Guss. ex Ten.) E.H.L.Krause; Hyacinthus racemosus L.; Leopoldia neumayeri Heldr.; Muscari ammophilum Sennen; Muscari atlanticum subsp. alpinum (Fiori) Garbari; Muscari bootanense Griff.; Muscari botryoides var. bucharicum Regel; Muscari breviscapum (Tod.) N.E.Br.; Muscari bucharicum Regel; Muscari conillii Sennen; Muscari dolioliforme Sobko; Muscari elwesii Baker; Muscari flaccidum O.Schwarz; Muscari grossheimii Schchian; Muscari letourneuxii Boiss.; Muscari leucostomum Woronow; Muscari macranthum Freyn; Muscari marianicum Pau; Muscari mordoanum Heldr.; Muscari neglectum f. bertramii Maire; Muscari neglectum var. macranthum (Freyn) Eker; Muscari neglectum subsp. odorum O.Bolòs & Vigo; Muscari neglectum subsp. speciosum (Marches.) Garbari; Muscari neumayeri (Heldr.) Boiss.; Muscari nivale Stapf; Muscari odoratum Montandon; Muscari racemosum (L.) Medik. (1793), nom. illeg.; Muscari racemosum lusus albiflorum Soó ex Priszter; Muscari racemosum var. alpinum Fiori; Muscari racemosum lusus pallidum Priszter; Muscari racemosum var. neglectum (Guss. ex Ten.) St.-Lag.; Muscari racemosum subsp. neglectum (Guss. ex Ten. & Sangiov.) Corb.; Muscari skorpili Velen.; Muscari speciosum Marches.; Muscari szovitsianum Rupr. ex Boiss.; Muscari vandasii Velen.; Muscari vinyalsii Sennen; Scilla suaveolens Salisb.

= Muscari neglectum =

Grape hyacinth

Species of plant in the asparagus family

Muscari neglectum is a perennial bulbous flowering plant in the asparagus family Asparagaceae. Members of this genus are commonly known as grape hyacinths, and M. neglectum is known as common grape hyacinth or starch grape hyacinth. Muscari are perennial bulbous plants native to Eurasia. They produce spikes of dense, commonly blue, urn-shaped flowers. It is sometimes grown as an ornamental plant, for example, in temperate climates as a spring bulb.

== Description ==
Muscari neglectum is a herbaceous plant growing from a bulb. The flower stems are 5–20 cm (2.0–7.9 in) tall. The flowers are arranged in a spike or raceme and are dark blue with white lobes at their tips (teeth); there may be a cluster of paler sterile flowers at the top of the spike. The raceme is 2–6 cm (0.8–2.4 in) long. The fruit is a 3-celled capsule with two ovules in each cell.

It is a very well known species in cultivation (being described as the "common" grape hyacinth by Brian Mathew); it increases rapidly and can become invasive.

== Range ==
The native range of Muscari neglectum extends around the Mediterranean basin including North Africa, Southern Europe, and Western Asia, and to Central Europe, Ukraine, European Russia, the Caucasus, Iran, Afghanistan, Pakistan, and Central Asia.

== Taxonomy ==
The name was attributed to Giovanni Gussone by Michele Tenore in a list of plants of the Neapolitan area published in 1842. The species has a confused nomenclatural history; Plants of the World Online lists 51 taxonomic synonyms. The name M. racemosum is commonly found as a synonym for M. neglectum in the horticultural literature, although the true M. racemosum Mill. is a different species.
