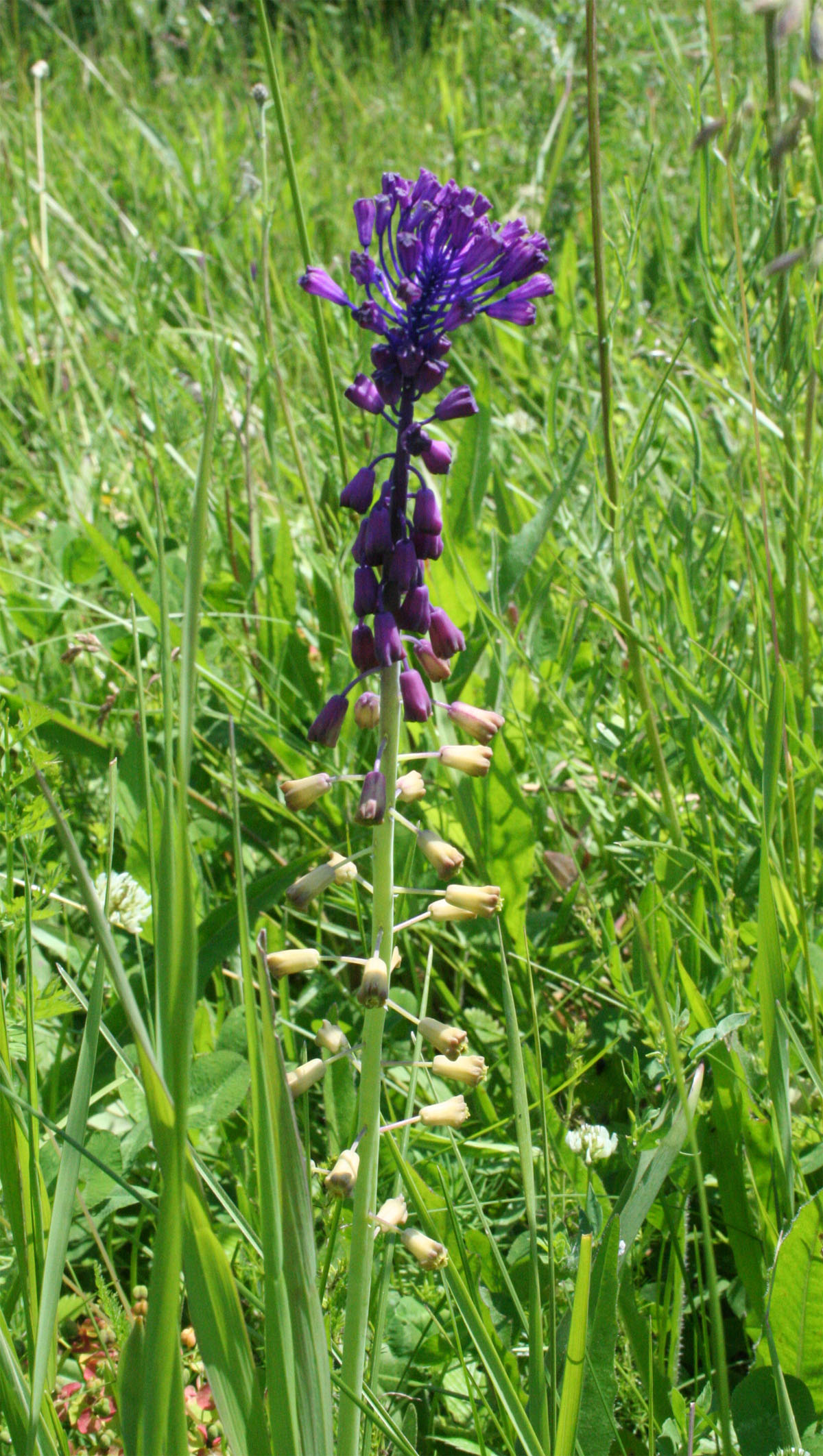
- Muscari comosa in Slovakia

Scientific classification
- Kingdom: Plantae
- Clade: Tracheophytes
- Clade: Angiosperms
- Clade: Monocots
- Order: Asparagales
- Family: Asparagaceae
- Subfamily: Scilloideae
- Genus: Muscari
- Subgenus: Muscari subg. Leopoldia (Parl.) Peterm.

Synonyms
- Leopoldia Parl.

= Muscari subg. Leopoldia =

Genus of flowering plants

Muscari subg. Leopoldia is a subgenus of bulbous perennial plants in the family Asparagaceae, subfamily Scilloideae. It may also be treated as the full genus Leopoldia. The subgenus is widespread around the Mediterranean region and neighboring lands, from the Canary Islands to Iran.

Species have been included in the genus Muscari, treated as a separate genus, and then re-included in Muscari as a subgenus. Like the rest of Muscari species, they are often called grape hyacinths. Their flowers are arranged in a spike or raceme with those at the top more brightly coloured than those lower down.

== Description ==
Muscari subg. Leopoldia can be distinguished from other groups within Muscari by being generally taller plants and having more open spikes or racemes of flowers, caused by the individual flowers being spaced further apart. The lower fertile flowers are relatively long, often urn-shaped or tubular and are white, yellow, green or brown but never blue; they have distinct 'shoulders' close to the mouth of the flower, which is smaller than the general diameter of the flower and surrounded by small lobes or "teeth" formed by the ends of the fused tepals. The colour of the lobes is a diagnostic feature in identifying species. At the top of the raceme there is usually a tuft of bright violet, blue or pink sterile flowers.

== Taxonomy ==
In 1819, William Herbert was the first to use Leopoldia as the name of a genus; it was proposed as a provisional name (nomen provisorium) for the genus he later (in 1821) called Hippeastrum. Although Leopoldia was subsequently validated (i.e. it became the correct name for Hippeastrum), this was overlooked, and Hippeastrum rather than Leopoldia was used for the genus of New World amaryllids. In 1845, Filippo Parlatore independently proposed Leopoldia for a group of species he separated from Muscari. In 1970, Fabio Garbari and Werner Greuter proposed that Parlatore's Leopoldia should be conserved and Herbert's Leopoldia rejected. This was accepted and Leopoldia Parl. is now a conserved name (nomen conservandum), and so is the correct name for the group described here when treated as a genus or subgenus.

Molecular phylogenetic studies have shown that when treated as a separate genus, Leopoldia is nested within Muscari, so treatment as M. subg. Leopoldia is more appropriate. As of September 2025, Plants of the World Online treated Leopoldia as a synonym of Muscari.

=== Species ===
A 2023 molecular phylogenetic study placed 29 Muscari species in M. subg. Leopoldia:

- Muscari albiflorum (Täckh. & Boulos) Hosni
- Muscari babachii Eker & Koyuncu
- Muscari bicolor Boiss.
- Muscari caucasicum (Griseb.) Baker
- Muscari comosum (L.) Mill.
- Muscari cycladicum P.H.Davis & D.C.Stuart
- Muscari eburneum (Eig & Feinbrun) D.C.Stuart
- Muscari elmasii Yıldırım
- Muscari erdalii Özhatay & Demirci
- Muscari erzincanicum Eker
- Muscari ghouschtchiense (Jafari & Maassoumi) Böhnert
- Muscari gussonei (Parl.) Nyman
- Muscari haradjianii Briq. ex Rech.f.
- Muscari longipes Boiss.
- Muscari longistylum (Täckh. & Boulos) Hosni
- Muscari maritimum Desf.
- Muscari massayanum C.Grunert
- Muscari matritense Ruíz Rejón, Pascual, C.Ruíz Rejón, Valdés & J.L.Oliv.
- Muscari mirum Speta
- Muscari muglaense Eker, H.Duman & Yıldırım
- Muscari neumannii (Böhnert & Lobin) Böhnert
- Muscari salah-eidii (Täckh. & Boulos) Hosni.
- Muscari savranii Uysal & Doğu
- Muscari spreitzenhoferi (Heldr. ex Osterm.) Vierh.
- Muscari tabrizianum (Jafari) Böhnert
- Muscari tenuiflorum Tausch
- Muscari tijtijense (Jafari) Böhnert
- Muscari wallii Rech.f.
- Muscari weissii Freyn

== Uses ==
Bulbs of Muscari comosum (syn. Leopoldia comosa) are pickled and eaten in Iran under the name of "moosir" (موسیر) (or 'shallot yogurt'), in Greece under the name of "volvoi" (βολβοί), meaning "bulbs", and in the Basilicata and Apulia region of Italy, under the names of "lampascioni", "lampasciuni", and "lamponi". They are included in the Ark of Taste catalogue of heritage foods.
