= Bellevalia paradoxa =

Scientific classification
- Kingdom: Plantae
- Clade: Tracheophytes
- Clade: Angiosperms
- Clade: Monocots
- Order: Asparagales
- Family: Asparagaceae
- Subfamily: Scilloideae
- Genus: Bellevalia
- Species: B. paradoxa

Binomial name
- Bellevalia paradoxa (Fisch. & C.A.Mey.) Boiss.

Synonyms
- Bellevalia acutifolia (Boiss.) L.N.Delaunay; Bellevalia elwendica Hausskn. ex Bornm. Bellevalia pycnantha (K.Koch) Losinsk. Botryanthus paradoxus (Fisch. & C.A.Mey.) Kunth; Hyacinthella paradoxa (Fisch. & C.A.Mey.) Chouard; Hyacinthella pycnantha (K.Koch) Chouard; Hyacinthus elwendius Bornm. Hyacinthus paradoxus Fisch. & C.A.Mey. Hyacinthus pycnanthus (K.Koch) Baker; Muscari acutifolium Boiss. Muscari elwendium Hausskn. Muscari paradoxum (Fisch. & C.A.Mey.) K.Koch; Muscari pycnanthum K.Koch; Pseudomuscari acutifolium (Boiss.) Garbari; Pseudomuscari paradoxum (Fisch. & C.A.Mey.) Garbari

Species of plant in the asparagus family

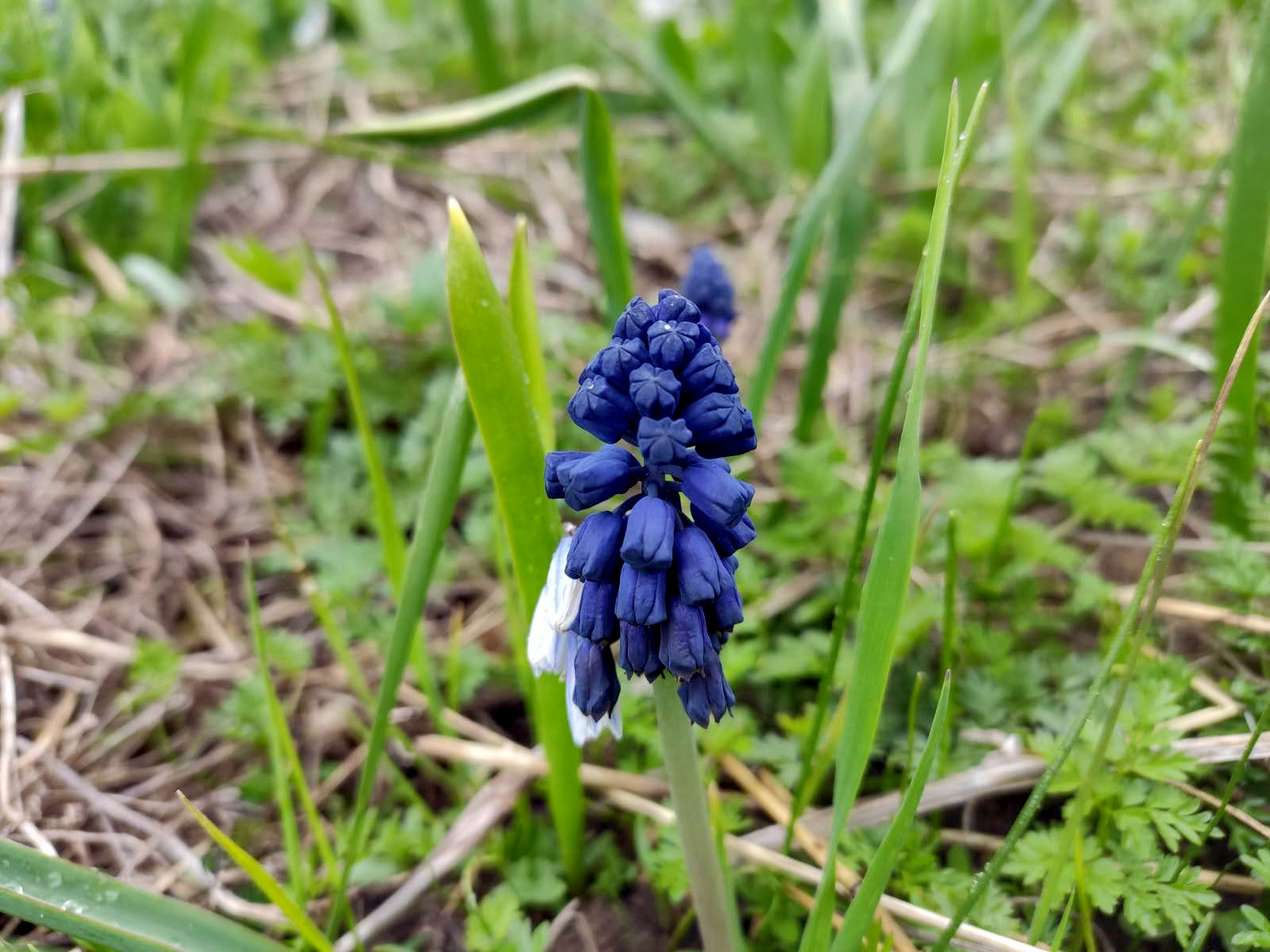
Bellevalia paradoxa in Armenia.

Bellevalia paradoxa is a bulb forming plant in the genus Bellevalia of the family Asparagaceae, formerly classified in the genus Muscari, under which name it is commonly sold as Muscari paradoxum.

== Description ==
Bulbs are globose-ovoid, 1.5–2 cm long and 1–3 cm wide. Leaves 2–3, linear, narrowed at the base, with pointed tips, 12–15 cm (4.7–5.9 in) long. The inflorescence is racemose, the petals 10–15 over a 1–2 cm brush, dark purple, with a perianth 0.5–0.6 cm long and 0.2–0.3 cm wide, anthers 0.6–1 mm, yellow. Bellevalia paradoxa blooms in late April, blooming for up to 25 days. In contrast to plant in the genus Muscari the flowers are campanulate, not rounded.

== Distribution ==
Eastern and north-eastern Turkey and Georgia, in mountain pastures, fields, rocky areas, and wet meadows at altitudes of 500–3,000 m (1,600–9,800 ft) above sea level.

== Cultivation ==
It is widely cultivated as an ornamental garden plant of the grape hyacinth class. It is hardy to USDA Hardiness Zones 7–9. It is best grown in relatively dry soil, in a sunny location.
