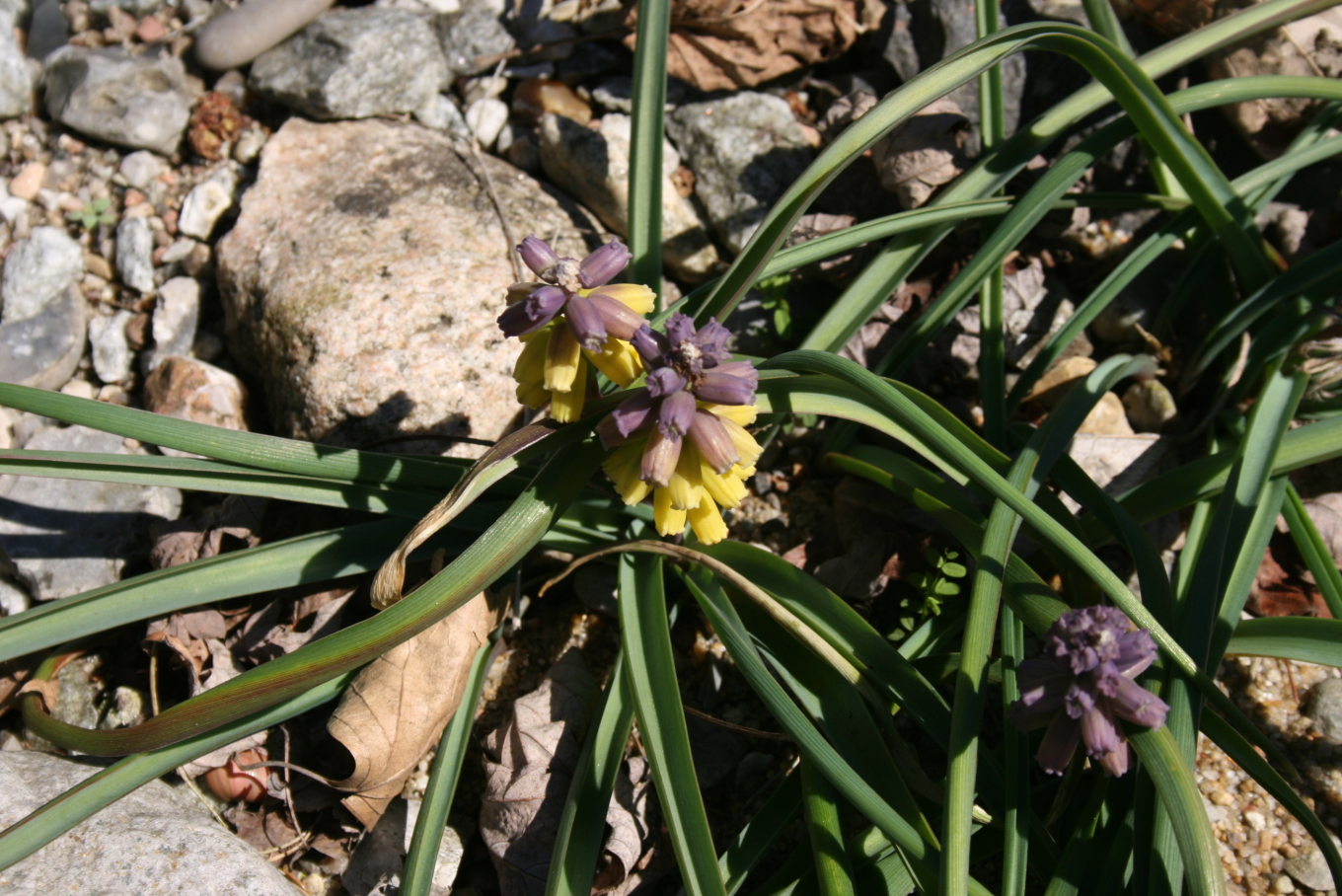

Scientific classification
- Kingdom: Plantae
- Clade: Tracheophytes
- Clade: Angiosperms
- Clade: Monocots
- Order: Asparagales
- Family: Asparagaceae
- Subfamily: Scilloideae
- Genus: Muscari
- Subgenus: Muscari subg. Muscarimia
- Species: M. macrocarpum

Binomial name
- Muscari macrocarpum Mill.

Synonyms
- Muscarimia macrocarpa (Sweet) Garbari; Muscarimia flava (Ker Gawl.) Garbari; Muscari moschatum var. flavum Ker Gawl.; M. moschatum var. creticum Baker; M. creticum (Baker) N.E.Br.; M. luteum Tod. ex Nyman

= Muscari macrocarpum =

Species of plant in the asparagus family

Muscari macrocarpum is a perennial bulbous flowering plant in the asparagus family Asparagaceae. It is one of a number of species known as grape hyacinth, in this case yellow grape hyacinth. Originally from eastern Crete, Amorgos and south-west Turkey, where it grows in rocky places, it is sometimes grown as an ornamental plant.

M. macrocarpum resembles M. racemosum (with which it has been placed in the Muscarimia group of the genus Muscari). It is a robust plant, with large bulbs which have thick fleshy roots. Each bulb produces several greyish-green leaves. Flowers are borne in a spike or raceme on a stem 10–15 cm (3.9–5.9 in) high. Individual flowers may be over 1 cm long, violet in bud and yellow when fully open; they have a distinct scent resembling bananas. Cultivars include 'Golden Fragrance'.
