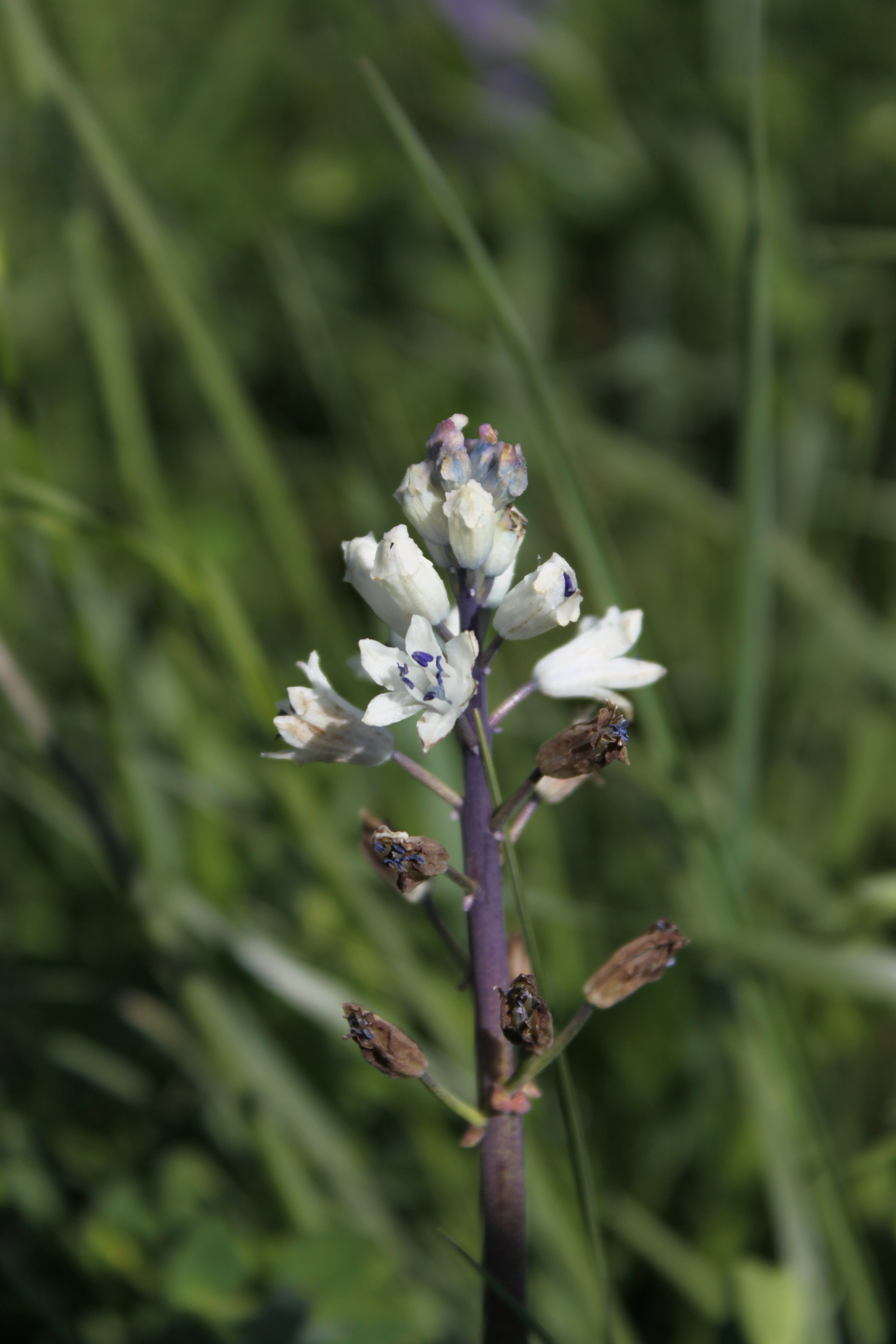

Scientific classification
- Kingdom: Plantae
- Clade: Tracheophytes
- Clade: Angiosperms
- Clade: Monocots
- Order: Asparagales
- Family: Asparagaceae
- Subfamily: Scilloideae
- Genus: Bellevalia
- Species: B. romana

Binomial name
- Bellevalia romana (L.) Sweet

Synonyms
- Hyacinthus romanus L.; Scilla romana (L.) Ker Gawl.; Bellevalia appendiculata Lapeyr.; Bellevalia cyanoleuca St.-Lag.; Bellevalia operculata Lapeyr.; Rytidolobus appendiculatus (Lapeyr.) Dulac

= Bellevalia romana =

Species of plant

Bellevalia romana is a species of perennial herb in the family Asparagaceae. It have a self-supporting growth form. Individuals can grow to 22 cm. The species is native to Europe and Egypt.

== Sources ==
This article incorporates text from a free content work. Licensed under CC0 (license statement/permission). Text taken from Bellevalia romana. Encyclopedia of Life.
