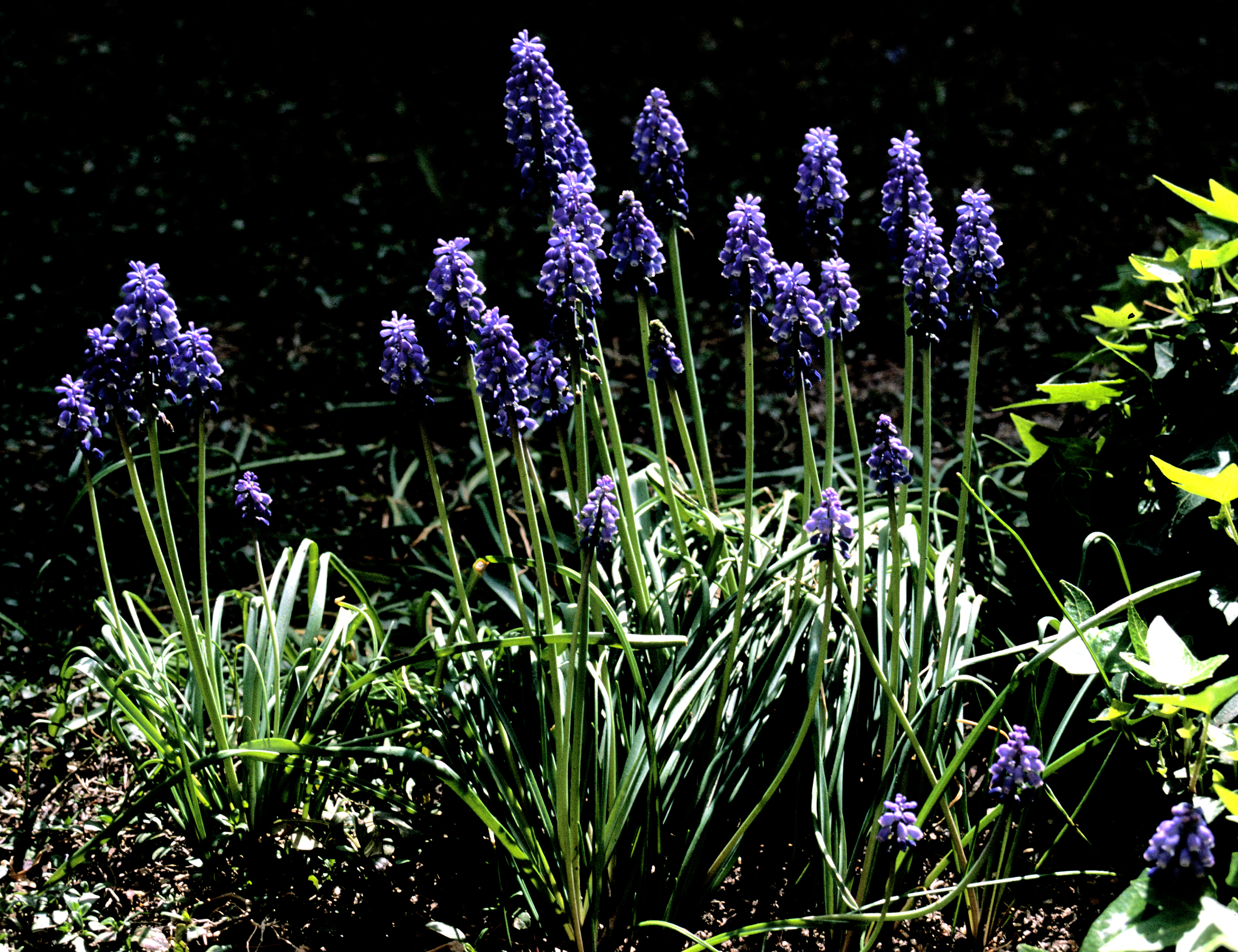
- Muscarimia muscari

Scientific classification
- Kingdom: Plantae
- Clade: Tracheophytes
- Clade: Angiosperms
- Clade: Monocots
- Order: Asparagales
- Family: Asparagaceae
- Subfamily: Scilloideae
- Tribe: Hyacintheae
- Genus: Muscarimia

species
- See text.

Synonyms
- Moscharia Tourn. ex Salisb.; Muscari subg. Muscarimia (Kostel. ex. Losinsk.) Böhnert

= Muscarimia =

Genus of flowering plants

Muscarimia is a genus of flowering plants in the family Asparagaceae. It includes two species native to Greece's Aegean Islands and southwestern Turkey. A 2023 phylogenetic study placed both species in a subgenus of Muscari, Muscari subg. Muscarimia.

- Muscarimia macrocarpa (Sweet) Garbari = Muscari macrocarpum – southern Aegean Islands and southwestern Turkey
- Muscarimia muscari (L.) Losinsk. = Muscari racemosum – southwestern Turkey
