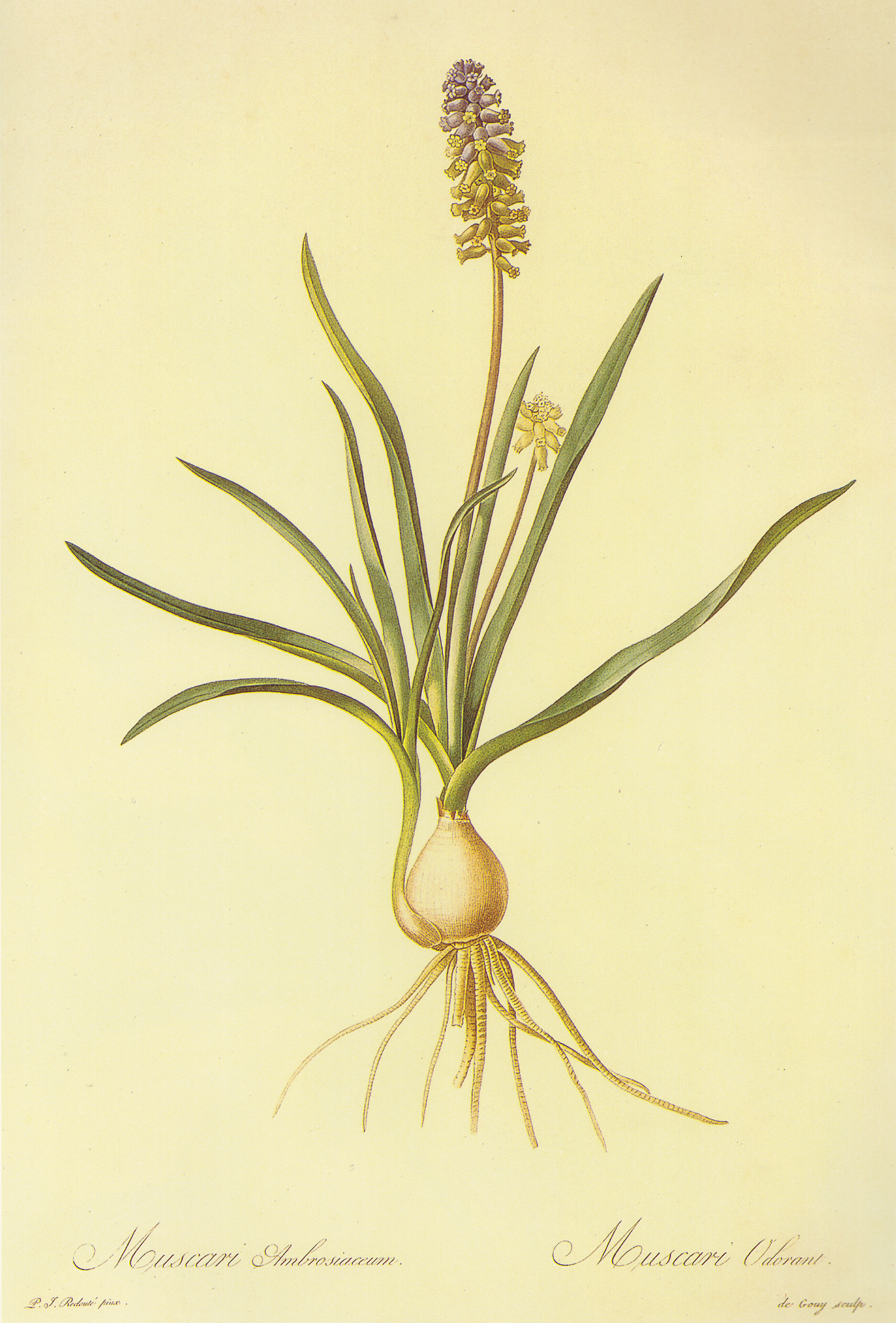

Scientific classification
- Kingdom: Plantae
- Clade: Tracheophytes
- Clade: Angiosperms
- Clade: Monocots
- Order: Asparagales
- Family: Asparagaceae
- Subfamily: Scilloideae
- Genus: Muscari
- Subgenus: Muscari subg. Muscarimia
- Species: M. racemosum

Binomial name
- Muscari racemosum Mill.

Synonyms
- Hyacinthus muscari L.; Muscari muscarimi Medik., nom. illeg.; Muscari moschatum Willd.; Muscarimia muscari (L.) Losinsk.

= Muscari racemosum =

Species of plant in the asparagus family

Muscari racemosum is a perennial bulbous flowering plant in the asparagus family Asparagaceae. The members of the genus are commonly known as grape hyacinths. Originally from south-west Turkey where it grows in rocky places, it is sometimes grown as an ornamental plant. It may be found in the horticultural literature under the synonym Muscari muscarimi.

M. racemosum resembles M. macrocarpum (with which it has been placed in the Muscarimia group of the genus Muscari). It is a robust plant, with large bulbs which have thick fleshy roots. Each bulb produces several greyish-green leaves. Flowers are borne in a spike or raceme. Individual flowers are 7–9 mm long, grey-white when fully open, sometimes with a bluish tone; they have a distinct scent of musk. This is the species from which the genus gets its name (Muscari is from the Greek muschos, meaning musk).
