= Muscari maritimum =

Scientific classification
- Kingdom: Plantae
- Clade: Tracheophytes
- Clade: Angiosperms
- Clade: Monocots
- Order: Asparagales
- Family: Asparagaceae
- Subfamily: Scilloideae
- Genus: Muscari
- Subgenus: Muscari subg. Leopoldia
- Species: M. maritimum

Binomial name
- Muscari maritimum Desf.

Synonyms
- Bellevalia fontanesii Nyman; Bellevalia maritima (Desf.) Kunth; Etheiranthus maritimus (Desf.) Kostel.; Hyacinthus maritimus (Desf.) Pers.; Leopoldia maritima (Desf.) Parl.

Species of flowering plant

Muscari maritimum is a genus of flowering plant in the family Asparagaceae. It is a bulbous geophyte native to Morocco, Algeria, Tunisia, and Libya in North Africa.
