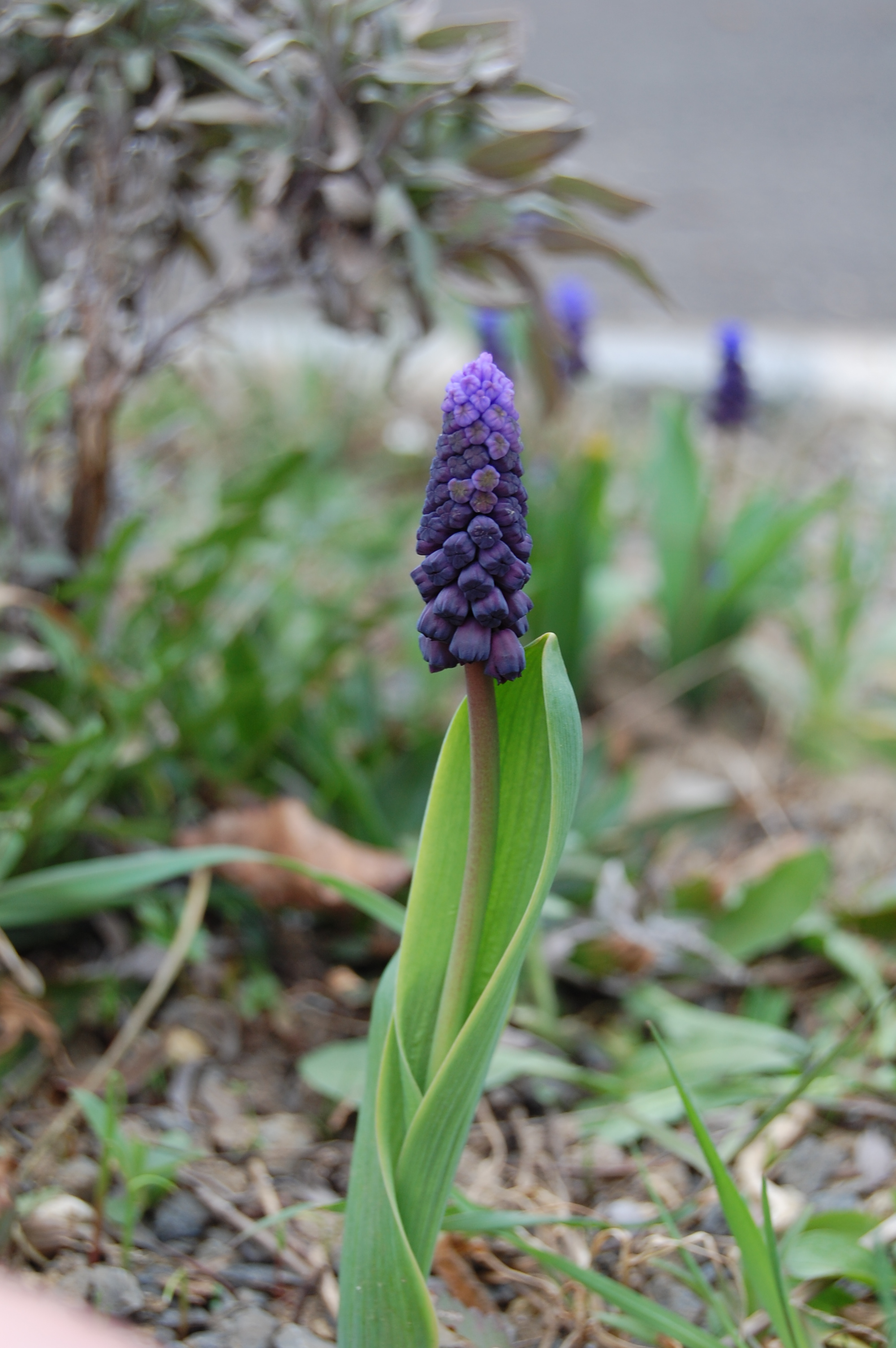

Scientific classification
- Kingdom: Plantae
- Clade: Tracheophytes
- Clade: Angiosperms
- Clade: Monocots
- Order: Asparagales
- Family: Asparagaceae
- Subfamily: Scilloideae
- Genus: Muscari
- Subgenus: Muscari subg. Pulchella
- Species: M. latifolium

Binomial name
- Muscari latifolium J. Kirk

= Muscari latifolium =

Species of plant in the asparagus family

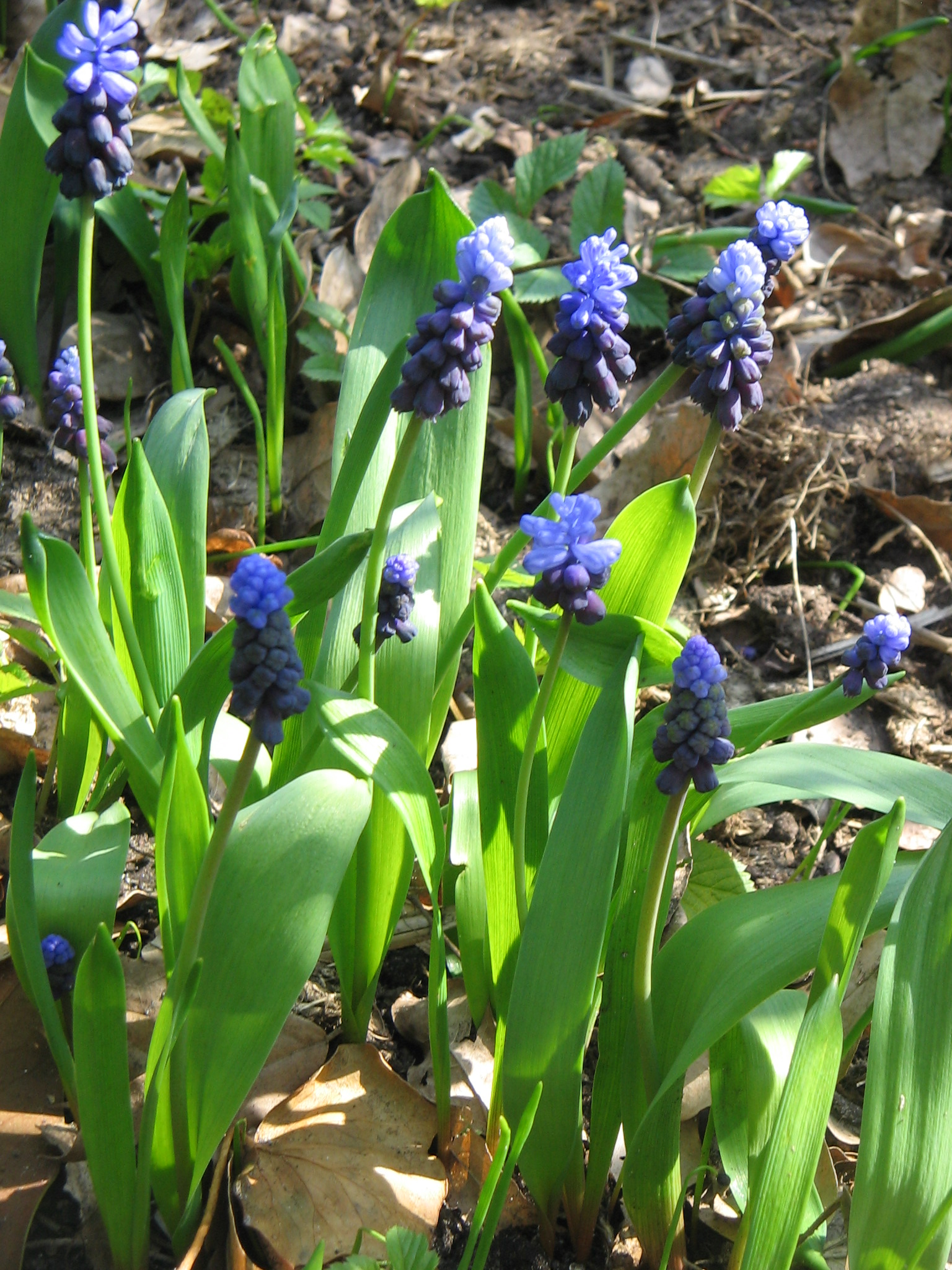

Muscari latifolium, the broad-leaved grape hyacinth, is a species of flowering plant in the family Asparagaceae. The Latin specific epithet latifolium means "broad-leaved".

== Description ==
It is a bulbous perennial geophyte, reaching a height of 15–40 cm (6–16 in), rarely 50 cm (20 in). There are usually one, rarely two leaves present. These are 7–30 cm (3–12 in) long and 1 to 3 cm wide, upright, wide and linear to ovate-lanceolate. They are drawn together and often hood-shaped. The flower stem is slightly longer than the leaves. The inflorescence is a raceme 2–6 cm (1–2 in) long and 1.5 cm (0.59 in) wide. The fertile flowers at the base are 5–6 mm long and 3 mm wide, oblong-shaped and a deep purple colour. The sterile flowers at the top are 4–8 mm long and pale lilac or blue. The flowering period extends from April to May in the Northern Hemisphere.

== Distribution ==
M. latifolium is found in southern and western Turkey, adjacent to sparse pine forests at altitudes from 1,100–1,800 m (3,609–5,906 ft).

== Cultivation ==
Widely used as an ornamental plant in flower beds, M. latifolium is hardy to USDA Zone 5, and in the British Isles and all of Europe down to −20 °C (−4 °F). It has gained the Royal Horticultural Society's Award of Garden Merit.

== Bibliography ==
- Eckehardt J. Jäger, Friedrich Ebel, Peter Hanelt, Gerd K. Müller (eds.): Rothmaler Exkursionsflora von Deutschland. Band 5: Krautige Zier- und Nutzpflanzen. Spektrum Akademischer Verlag, Berlin Heidelberg 2008, ISBN 978-3-8274-0918-8.
- Mathew, Brian (1987), The Smaller Bulbs, London: B.T. Batsford, ISBN 978-0-7134-4922-8, pp. 124–130
- Pacific Bulb Society

Media related to Muscari latifolium at Wikimedia Commons
