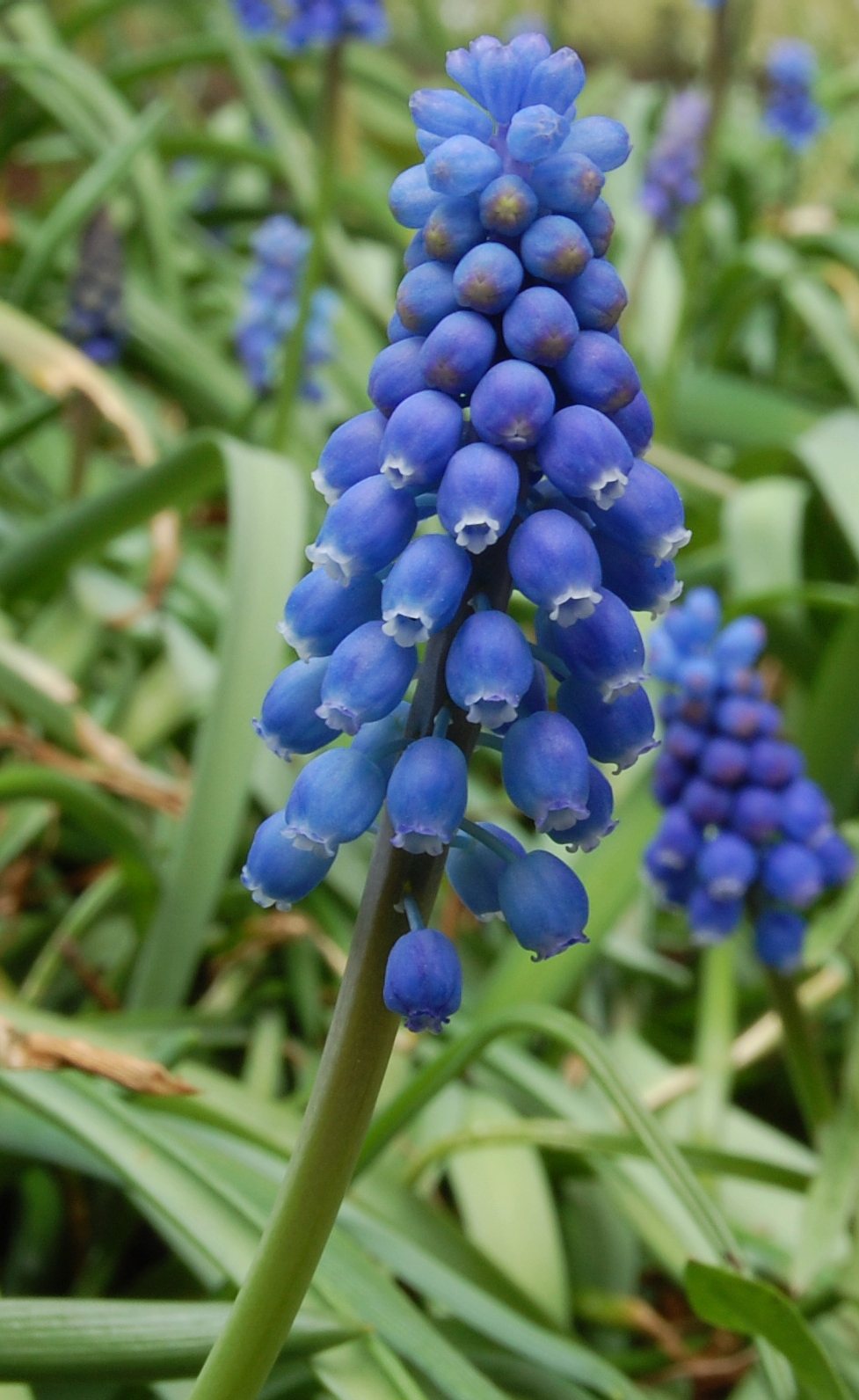
- M. neglectum

Scientific classification
- Kingdom: Plantae
- Clade: Embryophytes
- Clade: Tracheophytes
- Clade: Angiosperms
- Clade: Monocots
- Order: Asparagales
- Family: Asparagaceae
- Subfamily: Scilloideae
- Genus: Muscari; Mill.

Type species
- Muscari botryoides (L.) Mill.

Species
- See text

Synonyms
- List: Botryanthus Kunth; Botrycomus Fourr.; Botryphile Salisb.; Comus Salisb.; Czekelia Schur; Etheiranthus Kostel.; Eubotrys Raf. in Fl. Tellur. 3: 5 (1837), nom. superfl.; Eubotrys Raf. in Autik. Bot.: 124, 139 (1840), nom. superfl.; Leopoldia Parl.; Moscharea Salisb.; Pelotris Raf.; Pseudomuscari Garbari & Greuter

= Muscari =

Genus of plants in the asparagus family

Muscari is a genus of perennial bulbous plants native to Eurasia that produce spikes of dense, most commonly blue, urn-shaped flowers resembling bunches of grapes in the spring. The common name for the genus is grape hyacinth, but they should not be confused with hyacinths. A number of species of Muscari are used as ornamental garden plants.

== Description ==
Brian Mathew says that many species of grape hyacinths are difficult to distinguish. They usually have one or more narrow leaves which arise from a bulb. The flowers appear in the spring and form a spike or raceme, being held in a close or loose spiral around a central stalk. The flowers often become less tightly spaced as the flower matures. The flower colour varies from pale blue to a very dark blue, almost black in some cases (albino forms are also known). In some species, the upper flowers may be of a colour or shape different from the lower flowers. Individual flowers are composed of six fused tepals forming a spherical to obovoid shape, constricted at the end to form a mouth around which the ends of the tepals show as small lobes or "teeth", which may be of a color different from the rest of the tepal.

== Taxonomy ==
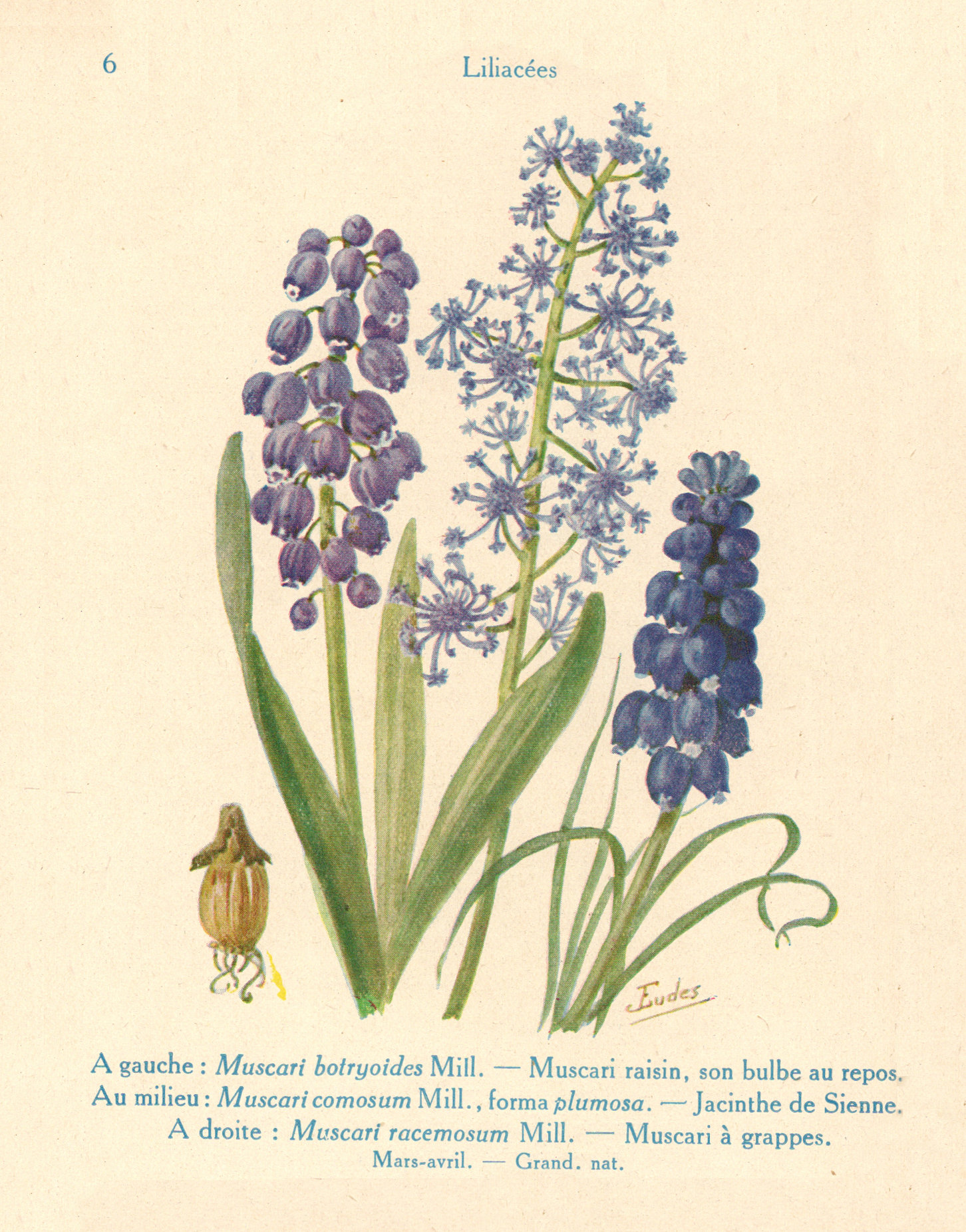
Illustration by Eugène-Jules Eudes, 1929

The use of muscari as part of the name of at least some of the species included in the modern genus can be traced back to Carolus Clusius in 1601, long before the modern rules of botanical nomenclature were established. In 1753, Carl Linnaeus used the name Hyacinthus muscari for the plant now called Muscari racemosum. In 1754 Philip Miller formally established the genus Muscari according to modern rules of nomenclature. The name muscari comes from the Greek muschos, musk, referring to the scent. Miller did not designate a type species, although the etymology of the genus name points to the species Linnaeus called Hyacinthus muscari (a.k.a. Muscari racemosum). Britton & Brown (1913), Garbari & Greuter (1970), Speta (1982), and Böhnert et al. (2023) accept Muscari botryoides as the type species.

Classified in the family Asparagaceae, subfamily Scilloideae, the genus was formerly placed in the Liliaceae as a member of the tribe Hyacintheae. The genus was at one time divided into four groups or subgenera: Botryanthus, Pseudomuscari, Leopoldia, and Muscarimia. Some authorities recognize Leopoldia and Pseudomuscari as separate genera. As of September 2025, Plants of the World Online continued to recognize Muscarimia as a separate genus, with two species – Muscarimia macrocarpa and M. muscari (syn. Muscari racemosum).

=== Subgenera ===
In 2023, Böhnert et al. published the results of a phylogenetic analysis of Muscari and its segregate genera. They found Muscari a "very natural group", with five distinct clades, which they recognize as subgenera:

- M. subg. Leopoldia (Parl.) Peterm., syn. Leopoldia Parl.
- M. subg. Muscari
- M. subg. Muscarimia (Kostel. ex. Losinsk.) Böhnert, syn. Muscarimia Kostel. ex. Losinsk.
- M. subg. Pseudomuscari (Losinsk.) D.C.Stuart, syn. Pseudomuscari Losinsk.
- M. subg. Pulchella Böhnert – a new grouping

The following cladogram shows how the subgenera are related:

- Muscari
  - M. subg. Muscarimia
  - - M. subg. Pseudomuscari
    - - M. subg. Muscari
      - - M. subg. Pulchella
        - M. subg. Leopoldia

=== Species ===
As of July 2025, Plants of the World Online accepted 85 species, including species that have been placed in Leopoldia and Pseudomuscari, genera which are treated as synonyms, but excluding Muscarimia. Subgenus placements in the table are from Böhnert et al. (2023).

Species	Subgenus
Muscari adilii M.B.Güner & H.Duman	Muscari
Muscari albiflorum (Täckh. & Boulos) Hosni	Leopoldia
Muscari alpanicum Schchian	unplaced
Muscari anatolicum Cowley & Özhatay	Muscari
Muscari armeniacum H.J.Veitch	Muscari
Muscari artvinense Demirci & E.Kaya	Muscari
Muscari atillae Yıldırım	Muscari
Muscari atlanticum Boiss. & Reut.	Muscari
Muscari aucheri (Boiss.) Baker	Muscari
Muscari azureum Fenzl	Pseudomuscari
Muscari babachii Eker & Koyuncu	Leopoldia
Muscari baeticum Blanca, Ruíz Rejón & Suár.-Sant.	Muscari
Muscari bicolor Boiss.	Leopoldia
Muscari botryoides (L.) Mill.	Muscari
Muscari bourgaei Baker	Pulchella
Muscari caucasicum (Griseb.) Baker	Leopoldia
Muscari cazorlanum C.Soriano, Rivas Ponce, R.Lozano & Ruíz Rejón	Muscari
Muscari coeleste Fomin	Pseudomuscari
Muscari coeruleum Losinsk.	Muscari
Muscari commutatum Guss.	Muscari
Muscari comosum (L.) Mill.	Leopoldia
Muscari cycladicum P.H.Davis & D.C.Stuart	Leopoldia
Muscari discolor Boiss. & Hausskn.	Muscari
Muscari dolichanthum Woronow & Tron	unplaced
Muscari eburneum (Eig & Feinbrun) D.C.Stuart	Leopoldia
Muscari elmasii Yıldırım	Leopoldia
Muscari erdalii Özhatay & Demirci	Leopoldia
Muscari erzincanicum Eker	Leopoldia
Muscari fatmacereniae Eker	Muscari
Muscari fertile Ravenna	Muscari
Muscari filiforme Ravenna	Muscari
Muscari forniculatum Fomin	Pseudomuscari
Muscari ghouschtchiense (Jafari & Maassoumi) Böhnert	Leopoldia
Muscari grandifolium Baker	unplaced
Muscari gussonei (Parl.) Nyman	Leopoldia
Muscari haradjianii Briq. ex Rech.f.	Leopoldia
Muscari heldreichii Boiss.	Muscari
Muscari hermonense Ravenna	Muscari
Muscari hierosolymitanum Ravenna	Pulchella
Muscari inconstrictum Rech.f.	Pseudomuscari
Muscari inundatum Yıldırım & Eker	Muscari
Muscari kerkis Karlén	Pulchella
Muscari kurdicum Maroofi	Pseudomuscari
Muscari latifolium J.Kirk	Pulchella
Muscari lazulinum Ravenna	Muscari
Muscari longipes Boiss.	Leopoldia
Muscari longistylum (Täckh. & Boulos) Hosni	Leopoldia
Muscari macbeathianum Kit Tan	Muscari
Muscari maritimum Desf.	Leopoldia
Muscari massayanum C.Grunert	Leopoldia
Muscari matritense Ruíz Rejón, Pascual, C.Ruíz Rejón, Valdés & J.L.Oliv.	Leopoldia
Muscari microstomum P.H.Davis & D.C.Stuart	Pulchella
Muscari mirum Speta	Leopoldia
Muscari muglaense Eker, H.Duman & Yıldırım	Leopoldia
Muscari nazimiyense Yıld. & Kılıç	unplaced
Muscari neglectum Guss. ex Ten. & Sangiov.	Muscari
Muscari neumannii (Böhnert & Lobin) Böhnert	Leopoldia
Muscari olivetorum Blanca, Ruíz Rejón & Suár.-Sant.	Muscari
Muscari pallens (M.Bieb.) Fisch.	Muscari
Muscari pamiryigidii Eker	Muscari
Muscari parviflorum Desf.	Pseudomuscari
Muscari pseudomuscari (Boiss. & Buhse) Wendelbo	Pseudomuscari
Muscari pseudopallens Eker, Yıldırım & Armağan	unplaced
Muscari pulchellum Heldr. & Sartori ex Boiss.	Pulchella
Muscari sabihapinariae Eroglu, Pinar & Fidan	Muscari
Muscari salah-eidii (Täckh. & Boulos) Hosni	Leopoldia
Muscari sandrasicum Karlén	Muscari
Muscari savranii Uysal & Dogu	Leopoldia
Muscari serpentinicum Yıldırım, Altioglu & Pirhan	Muscari
Muscari sintenisii Freyn	unplaced
Muscari sivrihisardaghlarense Yıld. & B.Selvi	Muscari
Muscari spreitzenhoferi (Heldr.) Vierh.	Leopoldia
Muscari stenanthum Freyn	Muscari
Muscari tabrizianum (Jafari) Böhnert	Leopoldia
Muscari tauricum Demirci, Özhatay & E.Kaya	Muscari
Muscari tavoricum Ravenna	Pseudomuscari
Muscari tenuiflorum Tausch	Leopoldia
Muscari tijtijense (Jafari) Böhnert	Leopoldia
Muscari turcicum Uysal, Ertugrul & Dural	Pulchella
Muscari tuzgoluense Yıld.	Muscari
Muscari vanense Uysal	unplaced
Muscari vuralii Bagci & Dogu	Muscari
Muscari wallii Rech.f.	Leopoldia
Muscari weissii Freyn	Leopoldia
Muscari zagricum Eker, Alipour & Majidi	unplaced

Böhnert et al. placed two species in Muscari subg. Muscarimia that as of September 2025 Plants of the World Online placed in the genus Muscarimia:

- Muscari macrocarpum Sweet = Muscarimia macrocarpa
- Muscari racemosum (L.) Mill. = Muscarimia muscari

The names of some of the species are somewhat confused, especially in the horticultural literature. Thus the name M. racemosum is commonly found as an incorrect synonym for M. neglectum, with M. muscarimi or M. moschatum being used for the true M. racemosum. Muscari fatmacereniae was recently described from Turkey.

==== Formerly placed here ====
- Bellevalia paradoxa (Fisch. & C.A.Mey.) Boiss. (as Muscari paradoxum (Fisch. & C.A.Mey.) K.Koch)

== Distribution ==
The genus Muscari originated in the Old World, and is native to the Mediterranean basin, central and Southern Europe, Northern Africa, Western, Central and Southwest Asia. It has become naturalized elsewhere, including Northern Europe and the United States.

== Cultivation ==
Some species are among the earliest garden flowers to bloom in the spring. They are planted as bulbs and tend to multiply quickly (naturalise) when planted in good soils. They prefer well drained sandy soil, that is acid to neutral and not too rich. Naturally found in woodlands or meadows, they are commonly cultivated in lawns, borders, rock gardens and containers. They require little feeding or watering in the summer, and sun or light shade.

The UK National Collection of Muscari is held by Richard Hobbs at his Witton Lane garden in Little Plumstead, Norfolk.

=== Cultivars ===
- M. 'Pink Sunrise' was described as "new" in 2011; it has pale pink flowers – a previously unknown colour in the genus – on 10–15 cm (4–6 in) stems.
