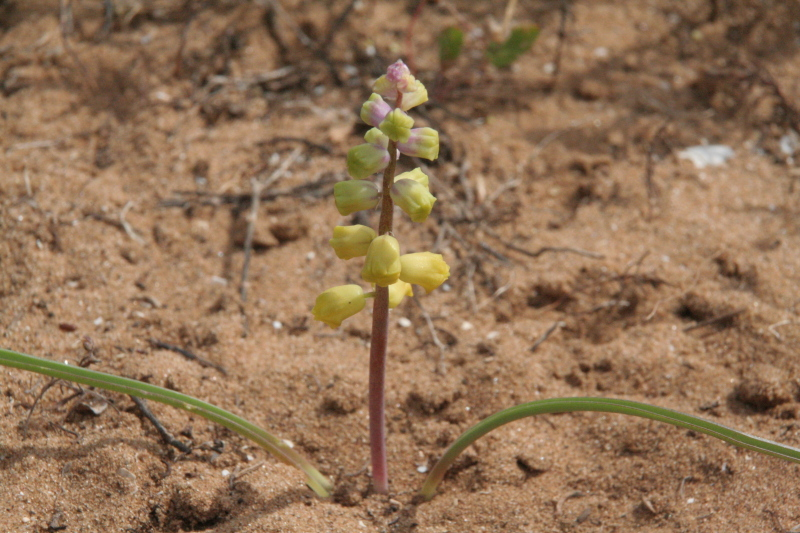

Scientific classification
- Kingdom: Plantae
- Clade: Tracheophytes
- Clade: Angiosperms
- Clade: Monocots
- Order: Asparagales
- Family: Asparagaceae
- Subfamily: Scilloideae
- Genus: Muscari
- Subgenus: Muscari subg. Leopoldia
- Species: M. gussonei

Binomial name
- Muscari gussonei (Parl.) Nyman

Synonyms
- Bellevalia cupaniana (Taranto & Gerbino ex Guss.) Nyman; Botryanthus gussonei Tod.; Botryanthus odorus var. gussonei (Parl.) Nyman; Muscari maritimum Guss.; Muscari cupanianum Taranto & Gerbino ex Guss.; Leopoldia cupaniana (Taranto & Gerbino ex Guss.) Parl.; Leopoldia gussonei Parl. (1857) (basionym); Muscari aestivale Baker; Muscari cupanianum Taranto & Gerbino ex Guss.; Muscari maritimum Guss.

= Muscari gussonei =

Species of flowering plant

Muscari gussonei is a species of flowering plant in the family Asparagaceae. It is a bulbous geophyte native to southern Italy and Sicily.

In 1992 it was designated as a 'priority species' under Annex II of the Habitats Directive in the European Union, which means areas in which it occurs can be declared Special Areas of Conservation, if these areas belong to one of the number of habitats listed in Annex I of the directive.
