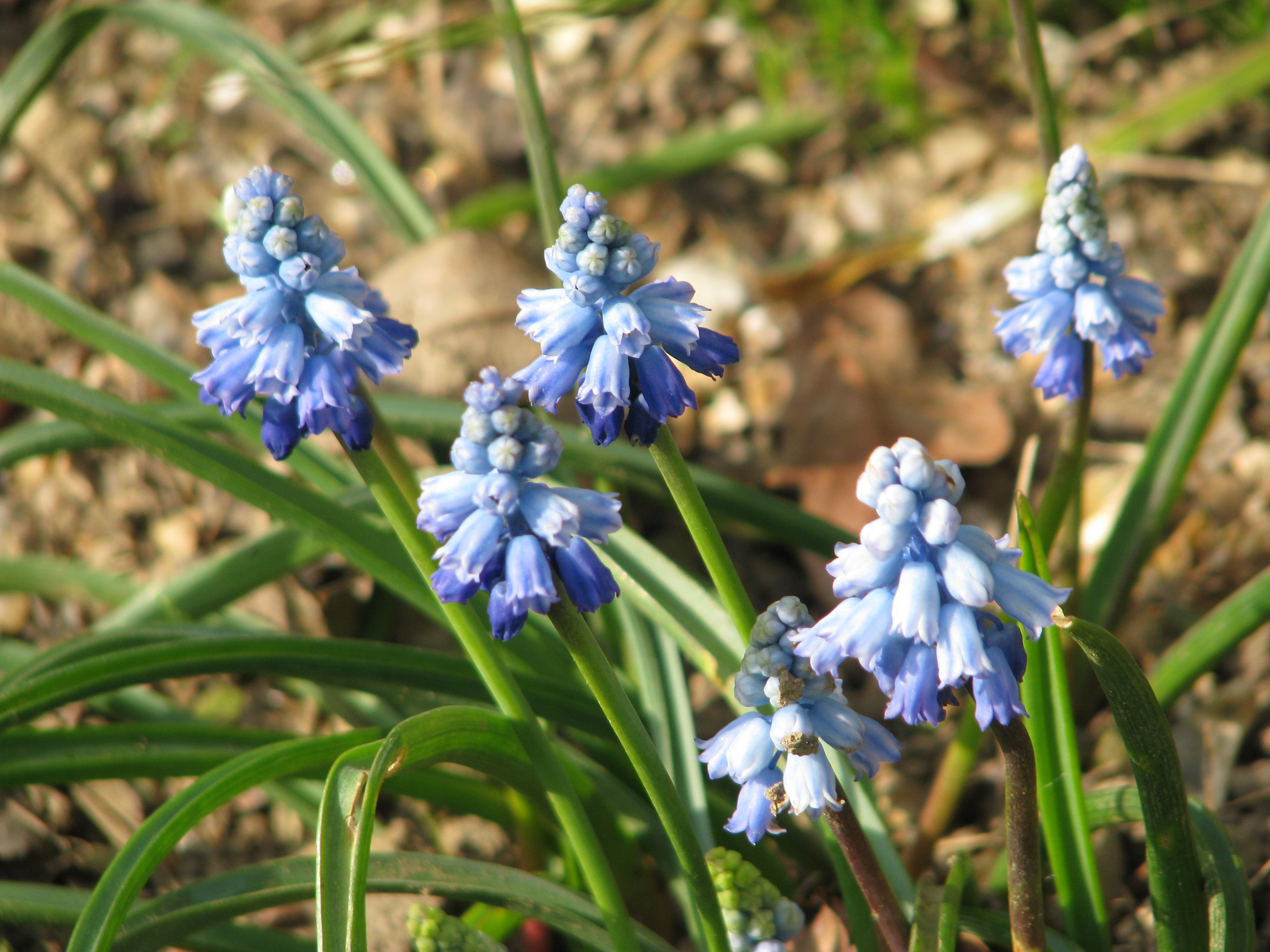

Scientific classification
- Kingdom: Plantae
- Clade: Tracheophytes
- Clade: Angiosperms
- Clade: Monocots
- Order: Asparagales
- Family: Asparagaceae
- Subfamily: Scilloideae
- Genus: Muscari
- Subgenus: Muscari subg. Pseudomuscari
- Species: M. pseudomuscari

Binomial name
- Muscari pseudomuscari (Boiss. & Buhse) Wendelbo

Synonyms
- Bellevalia pseudomuscari Boiss. & Buhse; Hyacinthella pseudomuscari (Boiss. & Buhse) Chouard; Hyacinthus pseudomuscari (Boiss. & Buhse) Baker; Muscari chalusicum D.C.Stuart; Pseudomuscari chalusicum (D.C.Stuart) Garbari

= Muscari pseudomuscari =

Species of flowering plant

Muscari pseudomuscari, synonym Pseudomuscari chalusicum, the Chalus grape hyacinth, is a species of flowering plant in the squill subfamily Scilloideae of the asparagus family Asparagaceae. It is native to northern Iran, where Chalus County is located. Growing to about 15 cm (5.9 in) in height, it is a bulbous perennial with floppy, curved leaves sitting close to the ground, and small clusters of bell-shaped flowers on erect stems, appearing in mid-spring. The flower colour is pale blue at the tip, shading downwards to a darker blue. Unlike some other Muscari species, it does not spread rapidly.

In cultivation in the United Kingdom it has gained the Royal Horticultural Society's Award of Garden Merit. It requires a sunny position in well-drained soil, and is hardy in most places in the UK - down to about −15 cm (−5.9 in).
