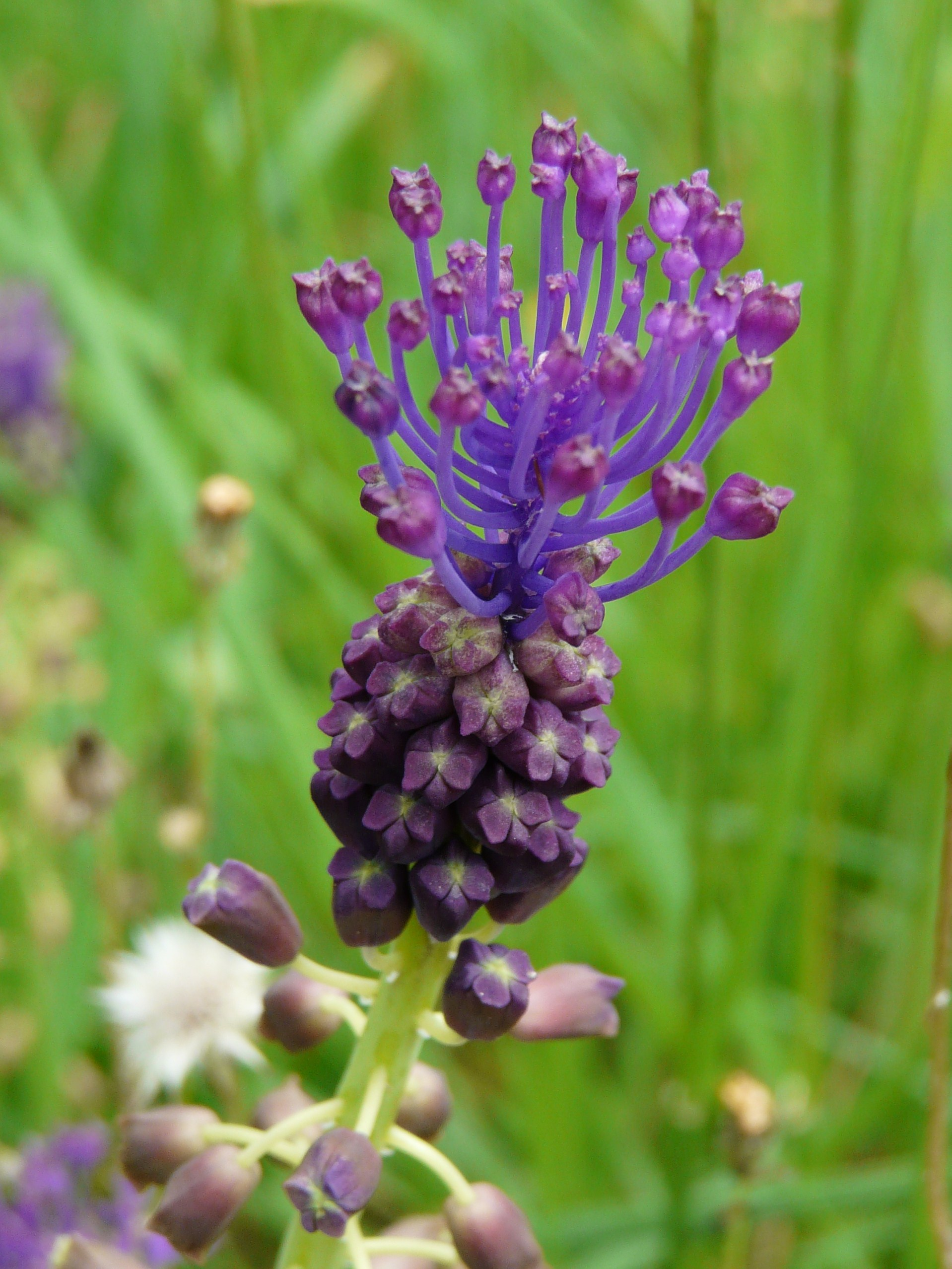

Scientific classification
- Kingdom: Plantae
- Clade: Embryophytes
- Clade: Tracheophytes
- Clade: Angiosperms
- Clade: Monocots
- Order: Asparagales
- Family: Asparagaceae
- Subfamily: Scilloideae
- Genus: Muscari
- Subgenus: Muscari subg. Leopoldia
- Species: M. comosum

Binomial name
- Muscari comosum (L.) Mill.

Synonyms
- Bellevalia comosa (L.) Kunth; Botrycomus vulgaris Fourr.; Eubotrys comosa (L.) Raf.; Hyacinthus comosus L.; Leopoldia comosa (L.) Parl.; Scilla comosa (L.) Salisb.

= Muscari comosum =

Species of plant in the asparagus family

Muscari comosum (formerly Leopoldia comosa) is a perennial bulbous flowering plant in the family Asparagaceae. Usually called the tassel hyacinth or tassel grape hyacinth, it is one of a number of species and genera also known as grape hyacinths. It is found in rocky ground and cultivated areas, such as cornfields and vineyards in the Mediterranean region, but has naturalized elsewhere. In Italy and Greece, the bulbs of this plant are eaten as a delicacy.

== Description ==
Described by Oleg Polunin as "a striking plant", it has a tuft of bright blue to violet-blue sterile flowers above brownish-green fertile flowers, which open from dark blue buds, somewhat like that of a Hanukkah menorah. This tuft gives rise to the name "tassel hyacinth". The flower stem is 20–60 cm (8–24 in) tall; individual flowers are borne on long stalks, purple in the case of the sterile upper flowers. Mature fertile flowers are 5–10 mm long with stalks of this length or more and are bell-shaped, opening at the mouth, where there are paler lobes. The linear leaves are 5–15 mm wide, with a central channel.

Muscari comosum naturalizes easily and may become invasive. It has spread northwards from its original distribution, for example appearing in the British Isles in the 16th century.

In a cultivar called 'Monstrosum' or 'Plumosum', all the flowers have become branched purple stems.

== Use as food ==
Pliny the Elder noted that the bulbs were eaten with vinegar, oil, and garum. Today, it is still eaten in some Mediterranean countries. In Apulia and Basilicata, it is cultivated and known as lampagioni or lampascioni. In Greek it is called βολβός, βολβοί, βροβιοί volví, vrovií (ασκουρδαλάκοι in Crete). In Greece and especially on Crete, it is considered a delicacy and collected in the wild. The cleaned bulbs are boiled several times, pickled, and then kept in olive oil. The tassel hyacinth is mentioned in classical Hebrew literature under the name bulbūsīn.

== Gallery ==
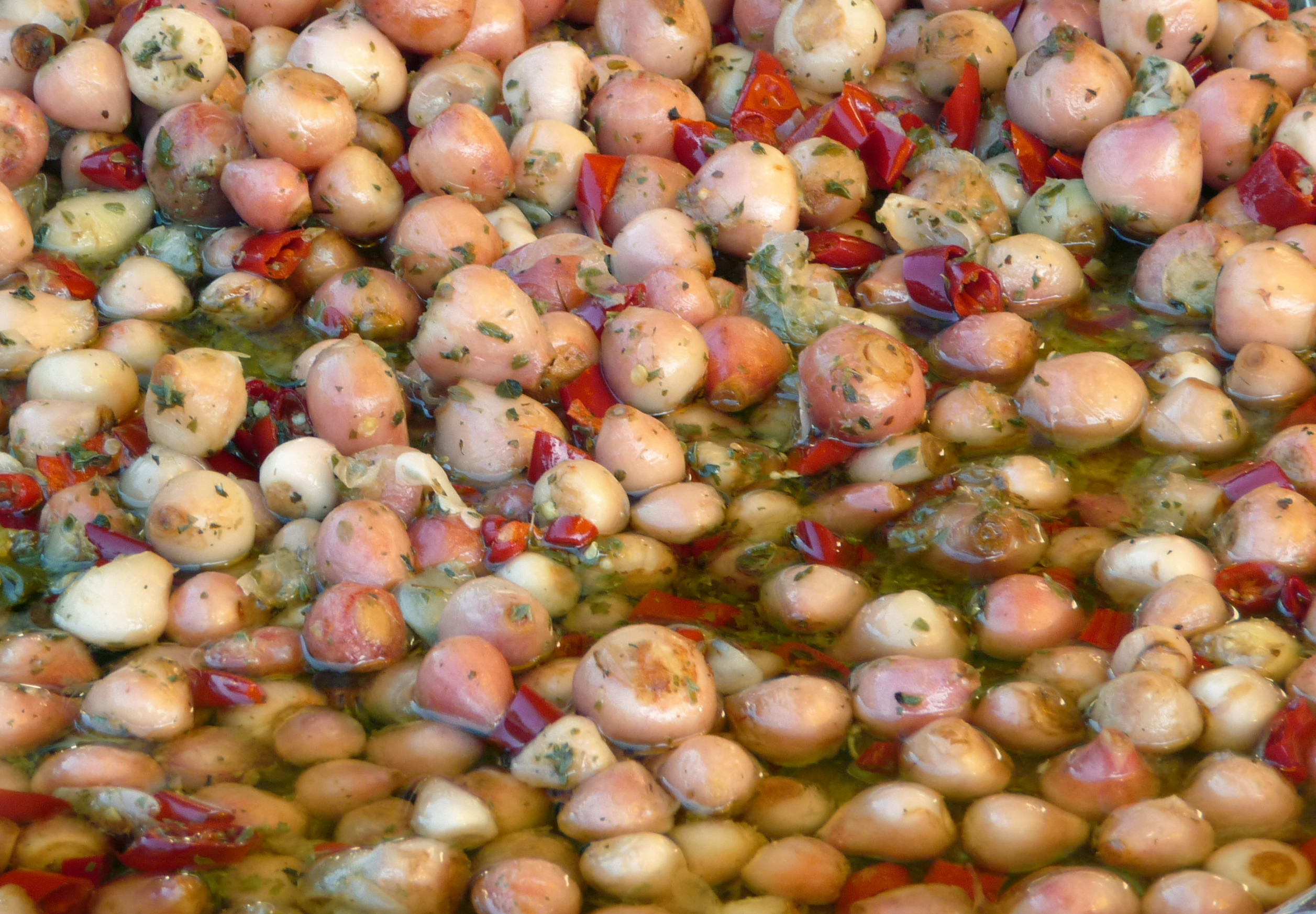
Lampascioni sott'olio, made from bulbs of Muscari comosum, is a gastronomic specialty of the Italian regions of Basilicata and Apulia.

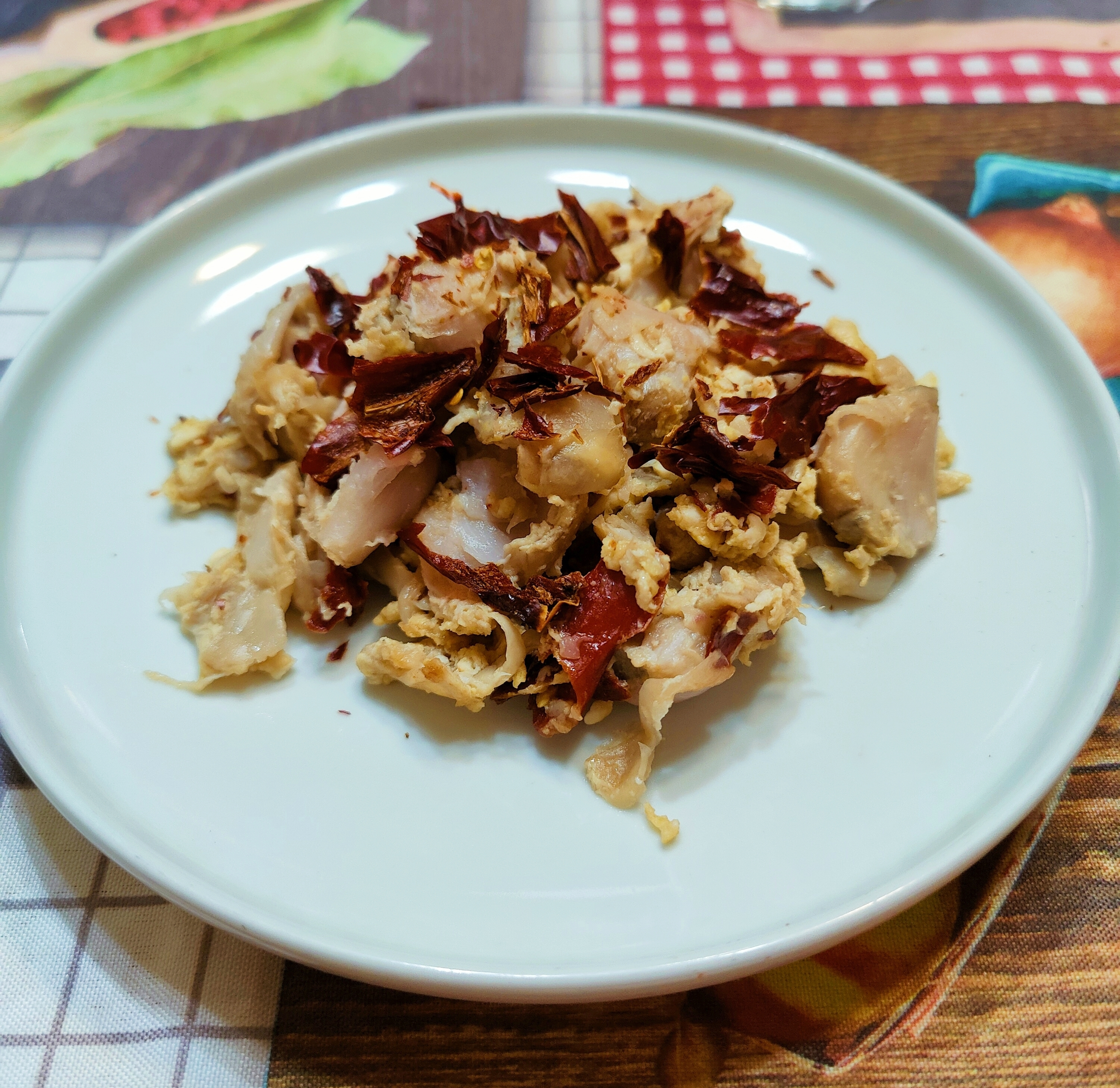
Insalata di lampascioni from Basilicata, with scrambled eggs and peperoni cruschi

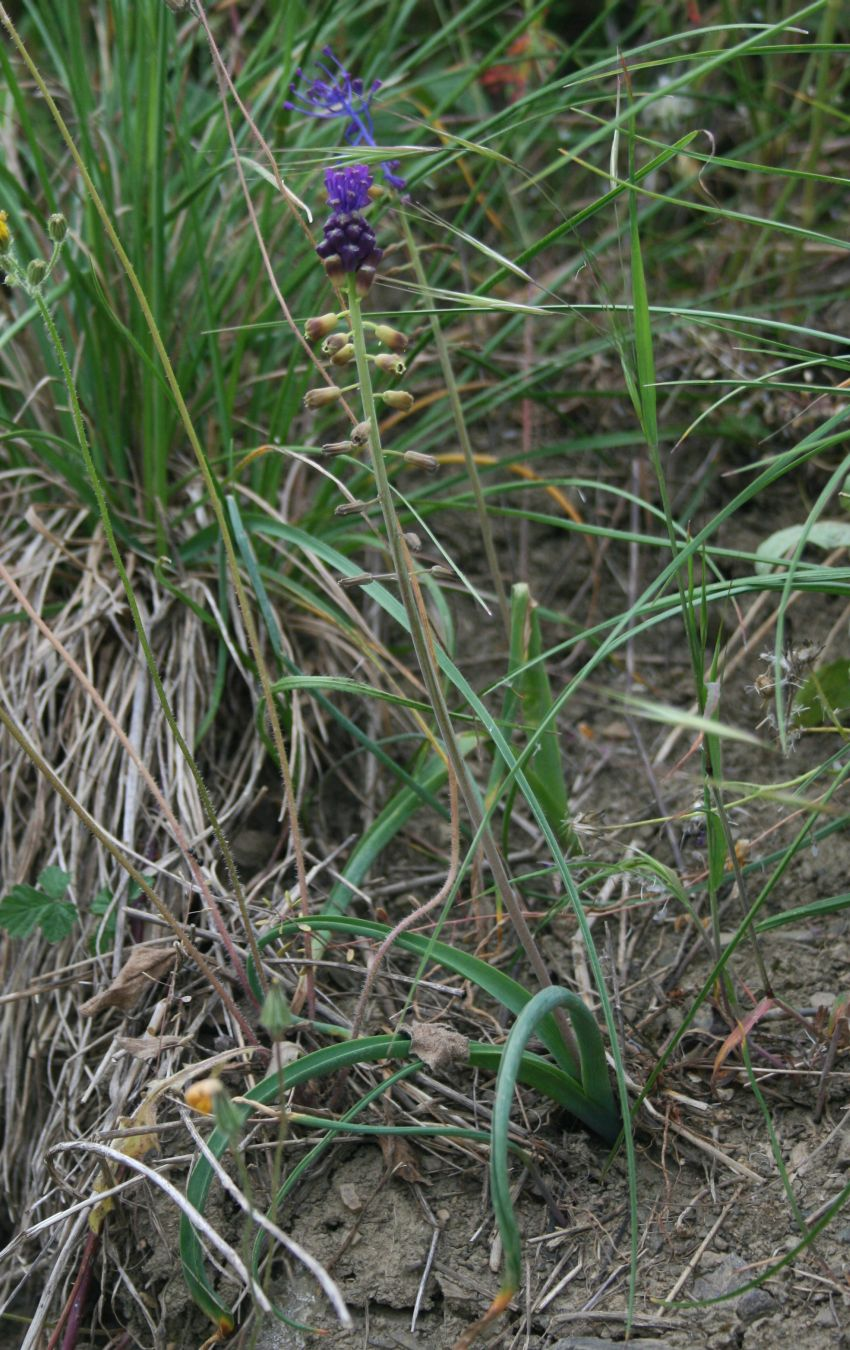
Leaves of the plant

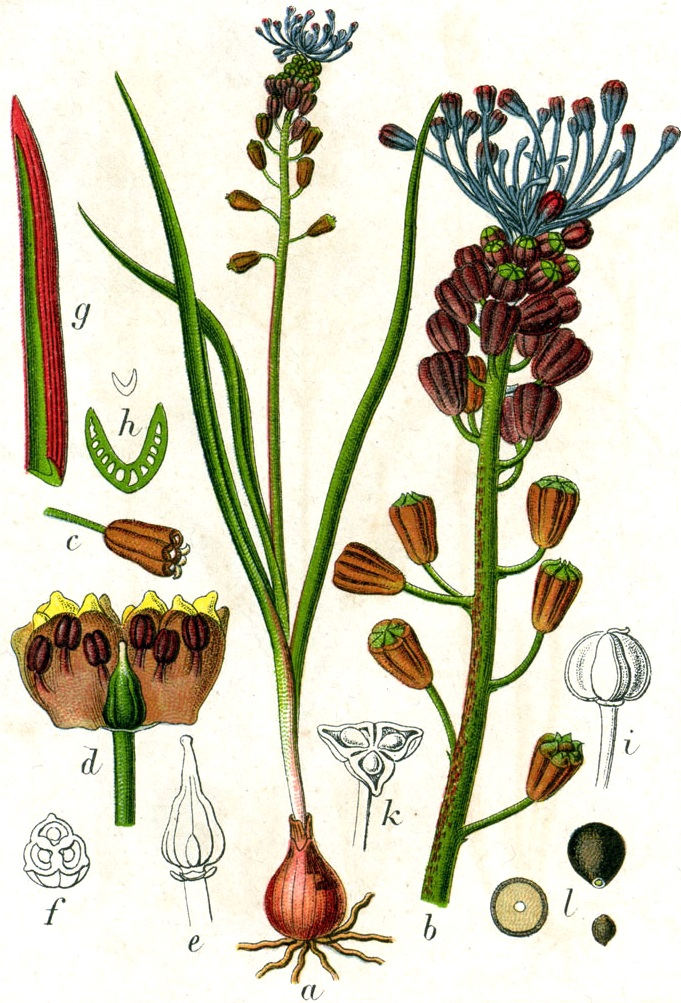
Illustration from Johann Georg Sturm (Painter: Jacob Sturm) 1796. Deutschlands Flora in Abbildungen, plate 40.

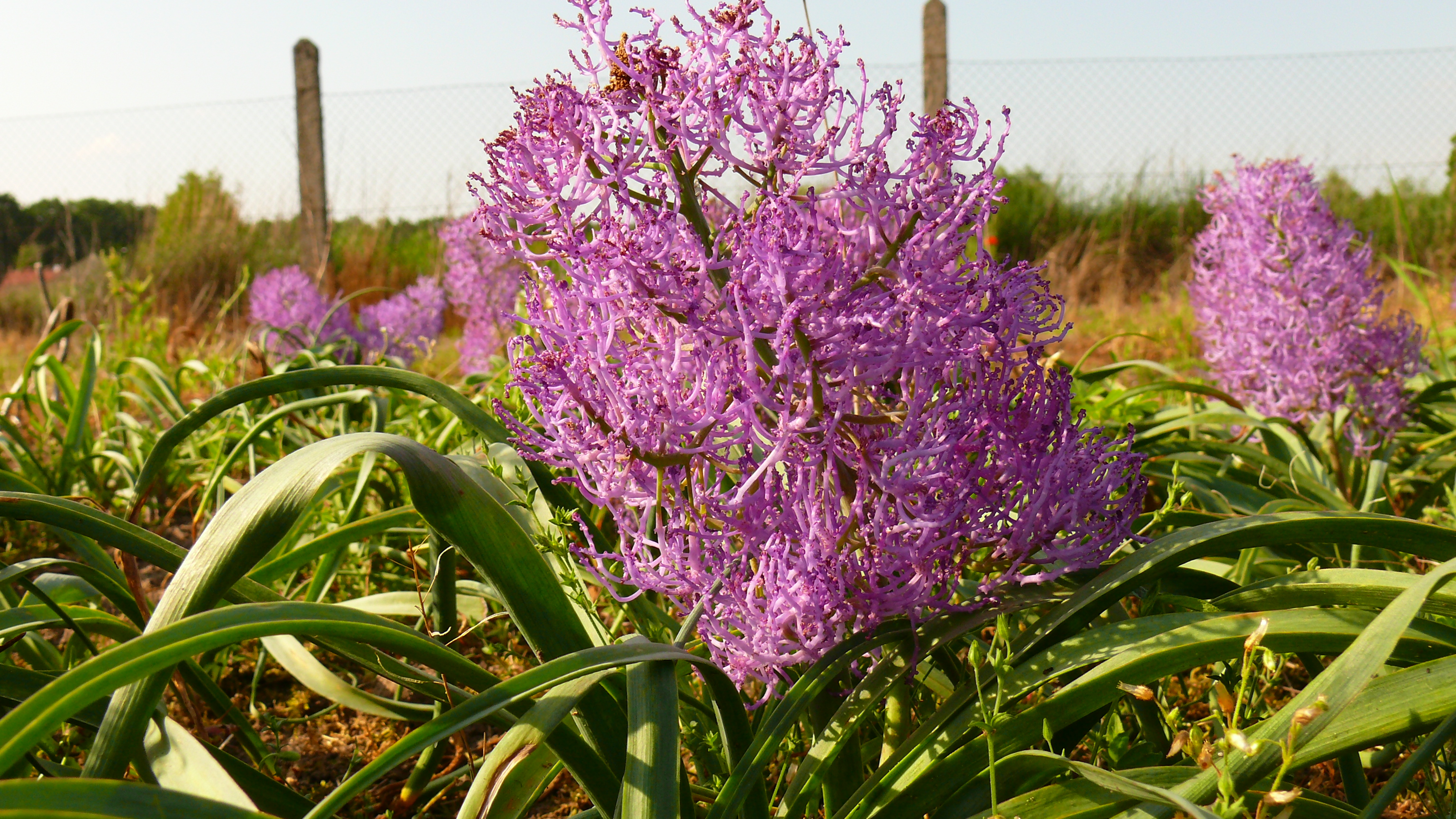
Ornamental cultivar 'Plumosum'

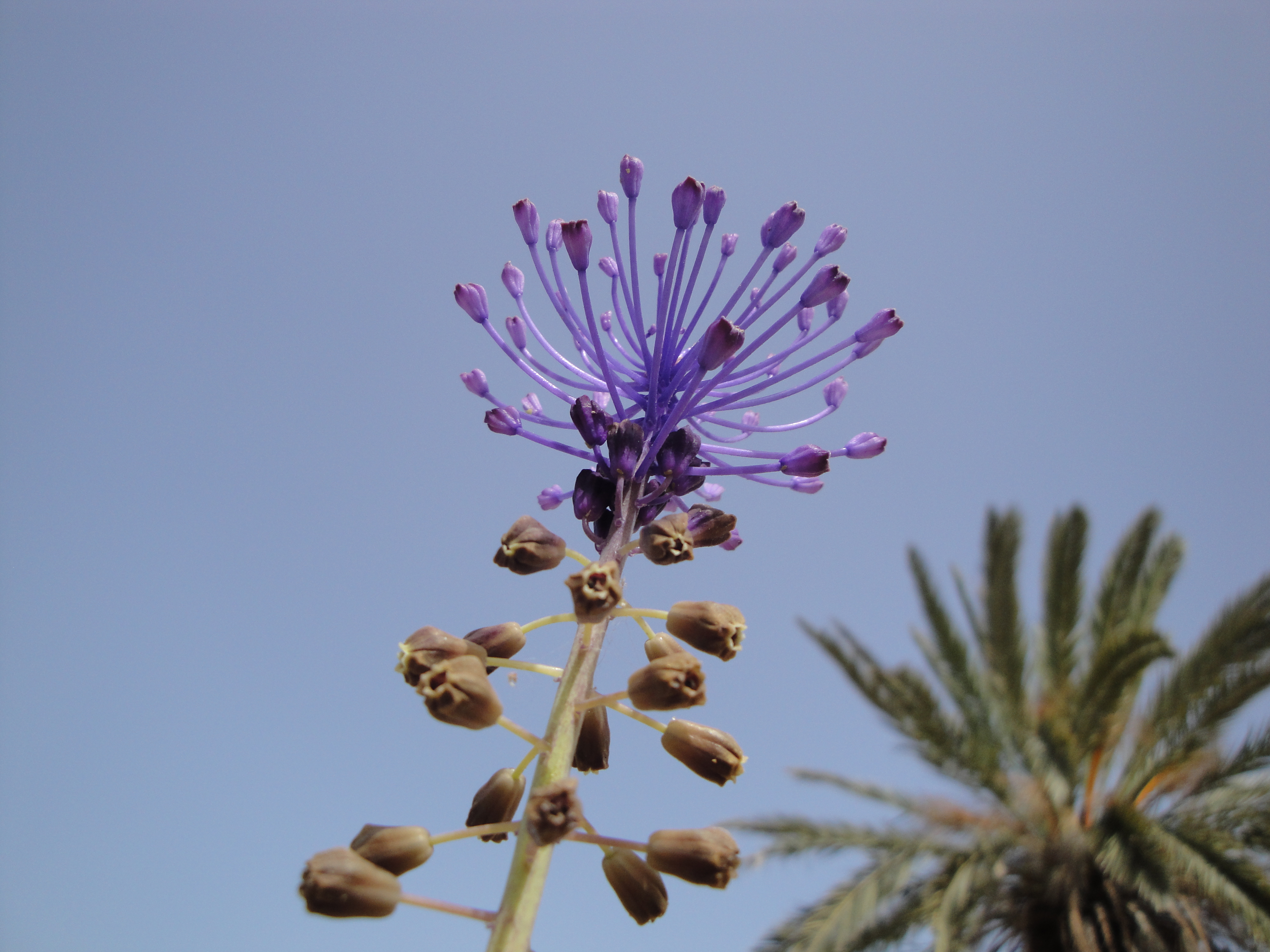
Clear flower view, Djerba island, Tunisia
