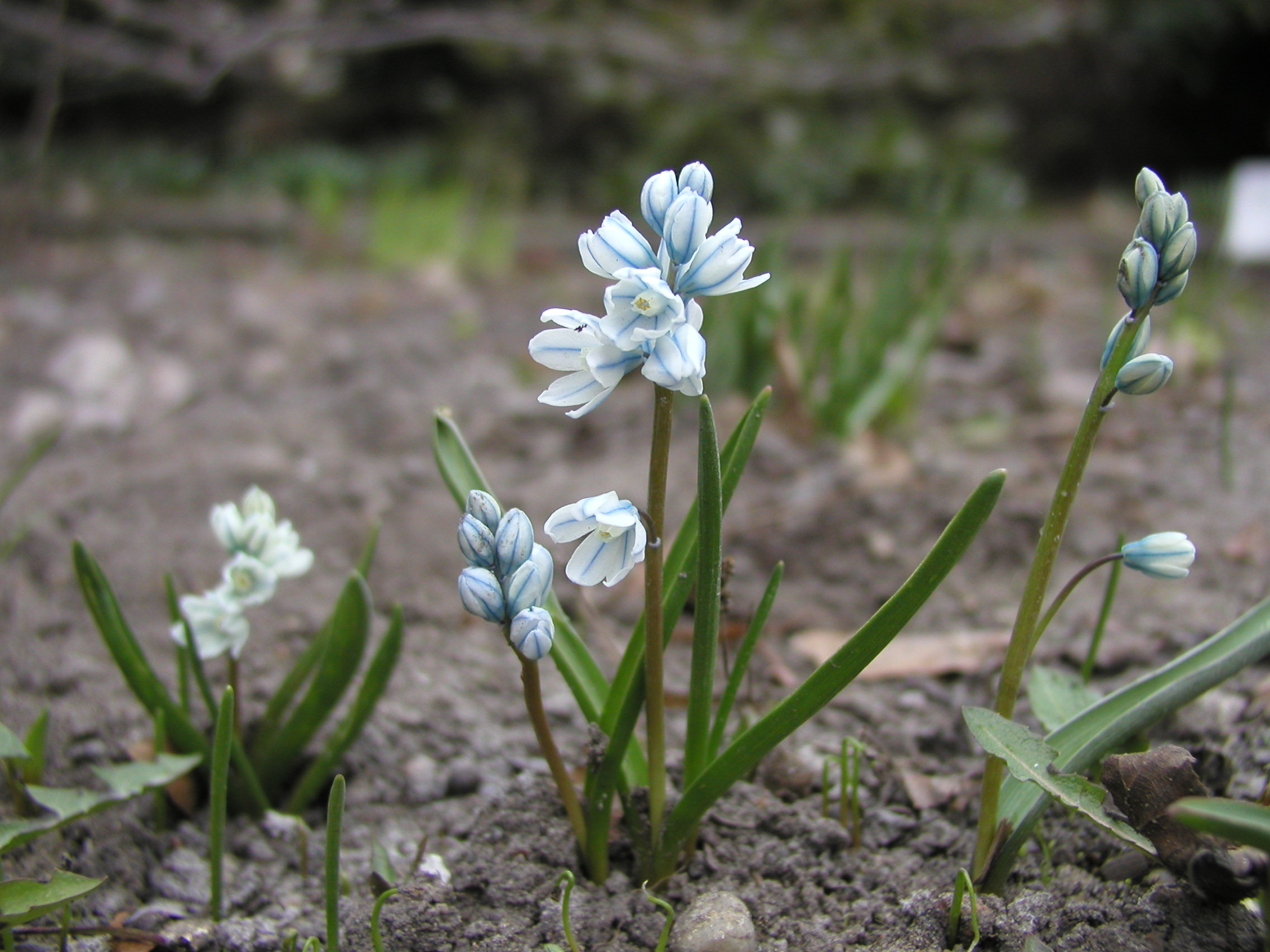
- Puschkinia scilloides

Scientific classification
- Kingdom: Plantae
- Clade: Embryophytes
- Clade: Tracheophytes
- Clade: Angiosperms
- Clade: Monocots
- Order: Asparagales
- Family: Asparagaceae
- Subfamily: Scilloideae
- Genus: Puschkinia; Adams

Synonyms
- Adamsia Willd.

= Puschkinia =

Genus of flowering plants

Puschkinia is a genus of four known species of bulbous perennials in the family Asparagaceae, subfamily Scilloideae. It is native to the Caucasus and the Middle East. Puschkinia scilloides is grown as an ornamental bulbous plant.

== Description ==
The leaves are green, strap-like, and grow in pairs. The flowers are borne in early spring in racemes up to about 25 cm (10 in) high. The six tepals are joined at the base to form a tube to about half their length. Like members of the former genus Chionodoxa (now a section of Scilla), the bases of the stamens are flattened and closely clustered in the middle of the flower; however, unlike Chionodoxa, they are joined to form a cup or corona. In the related genus Scilla (squills), the stamens are not joined together. Seeds are borne in three-parted capsules. After the seed ripens in early summer, the plants become dormant until the next spring.

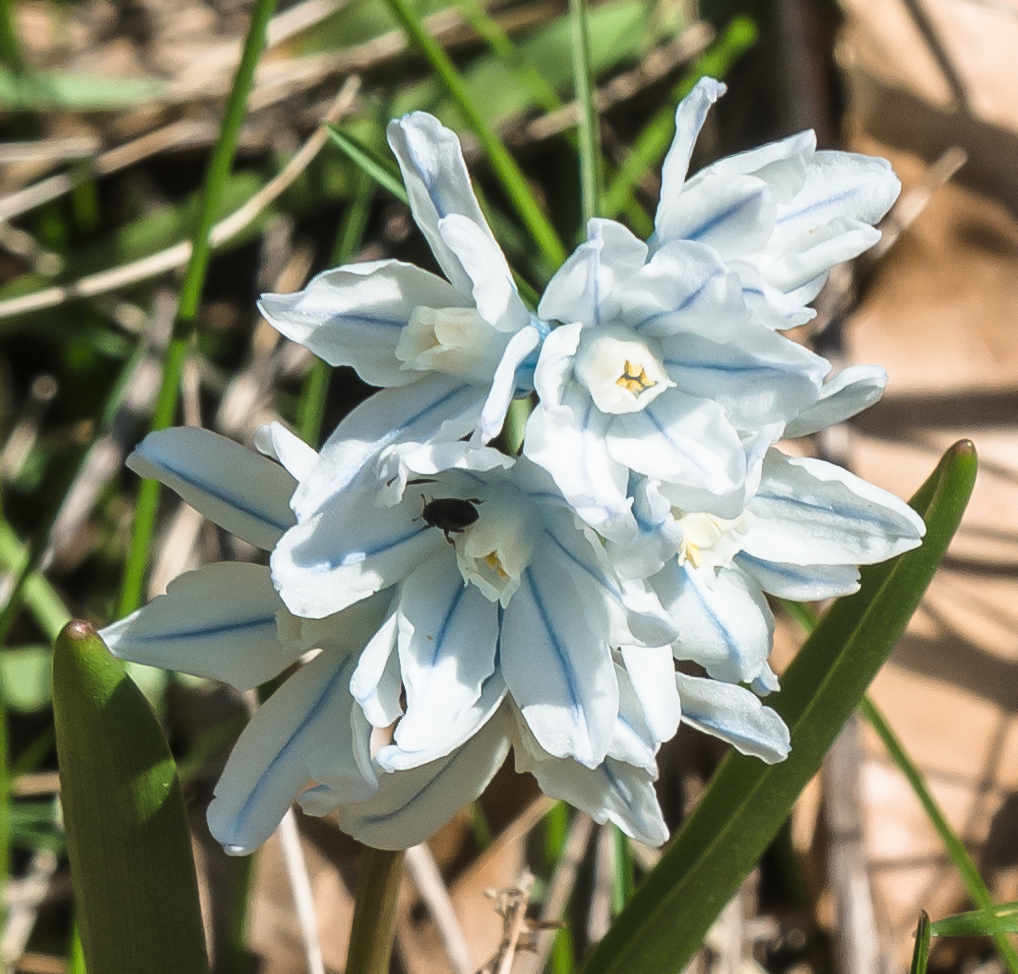
Close-up of flower of Puschkinia scilloides

== Taxonomy ==
The genus Puschkinia was erected by Johann Friedrich Adam in 1805. It is named in honor of the Russian botanist Apollo Mussin-Pushkin. Now placed in the subfamily Scilloideae of the family Asparagaceae, like other lilioid monocots, it was once included in the Liliaceae.

=== Species ===
As of April 2022, the World Checklist of Selected Plant Families accepted four species:

- Puschkinia bilgineri Yildirim – Turkey
- Puschkinia kurdistanica Ruksans – Turkey
- Puschkinia peshmenii Rix & B.Mathew - native to Turkey and Iran
- Puschkinia scilloides Adams (striped squill) - native to the Caucasus, Turkey, northern Iran and Lebanon; found in mountain meadows and stony slopes up to 3,000 m (9,800 ft)

== Cultivation ==
Puschkinia scilloides is grown as an ornamental bulbous plant, particularly recommended as an early flowering bulb for cool, well drained positions. Puschkinia peshmenii is rare in cultivation.

== Culture ==
In 1993, an illustration of Puschkinia scilloides was used as a postage stamp in Azerbaijan, with a series of other flowers, including Iris reticulata, Tulipa systola (syn. T. persica), Iris acutiloba, Iris iberica subsp. elegantissima (syn. I. elegantissima) and Tulipa florenskyii.
