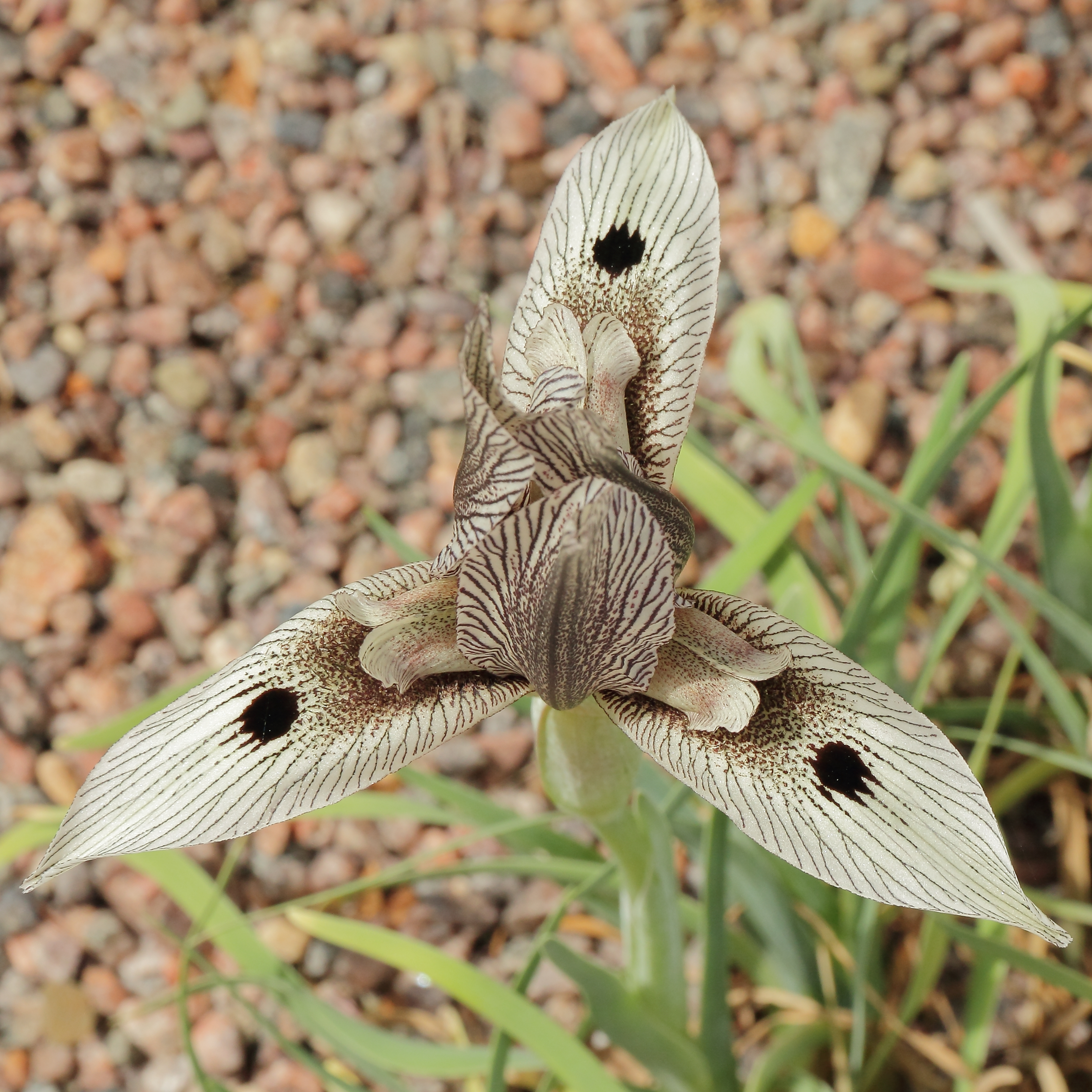
- Iris helena, a synonym of Iris auctiloba subsp. lineolata, located in the Botanical Garden of Gothenburg

Scientific classification
- Kingdom: Plantae
- Clade: Embryophytes
- Clade: Tracheophytes
- Clade: Spermatophytes
- Clade: Angiosperms
- Clade: Monocots
- Order: Asparagales
- Family: Iridaceae
- Genus: Iris
- Species: I. acutiloba
- Subspecies: I. a. subsp. lineolata

Trinomial name
- Iris acutiloba subsp. lineolata (Trautv.) B.Mathew & Wendelbo.

Synonyms
- Iris acutiloba var. lineolata Trautv.; Iris ewbankiana Foster; Iris helena K.Koch; Iris lineolata (Trautv.) Grossh.; Oncocyclus helena K.Koch [Invalid]

= Iris acutiloba subsp. lineolata =

Subspecies of flowering plant

Iris acutiloba subsp. lineolata is a species in the genus Iris, it is also in the subgenus of Iris. It is a subspecies of Iris acutiloba, and is a rhizomatous perennial, from the mountains of Iran, Turkey, Turkmenistan, Tajikistan and Azerbaijan. It has narrow, lanceolate, or falcate (sickle-shaped) leaves, which are grey-green and glaucous. It has a slender straight stem holding one terminal flower. The flowers, come in shades of white, cream, or creamy white and have veining that is purple or brown, or a mixture of both. It is heavily veined or streaked in purple or brown, with a dark purple-brown, spot on 3 of the outer petals and brown, dark purple, or black short beard. It is rarely cultivated as an ornamental plant in temperate regions, unless grown in a greenhouse.

== Description ==
It has a rhizome that is very similar to other Oncocyclus irises. They are brown, small, slender, (around 1 cm wide), and short. They are branched, with reddish secondary roots, and have a creeping habit, across the ground.

It has narrow, lanceolate, or recurved, and falcate (sickle-shaped) leaves, which are grey-green, and glaucous. They are less falcate than Iris acutiloba, but more falcate than Iris meda. They can grow up to between 10 and 20 cm (4 and 8 in) long, and between 0.2 and 0.7 cm wide.

It has a slender straight stem, although the base of the stem can be thickened, it can grow up to 8–35 cm (3–14 in) tall, it is generally about 10 cm tall. The stem has a green, lanceolate (narrow and pointed), spathe (leaf of the flower bud). It is not inflated, like many other irises, and they stay green after blossoming. They can be 15 mm long.

The stem holds 1 terminal (top of stem) flower, blooming between April, and May, or May to June, or between June and August.

The flower is very similar in shape and shade to Iris acutiloba, it can be described as looking like a bat that has cross bred with a zebra.

The pale flowers, are 5–9 cm (2–4 in) in diameter, come in shades of white, cream, light yellow, or creamy white. They have veining that is purple or brown, or grey, or black. The climate and soil type, can have an influence on the shade of the flowers, so that they can vary in the wild. Some forms of have creamy or yellow markings or veining.

Like other irises, it has 2 pairs of petals, 3 large sepals (outer petals), known as the 'falls' and 3 inner, smaller petals (or tepals), known as the 'standards'. The falls are oblong, or pointed, and lanceolate shaped, and can be 4–7 cm (2–3 in) long, and 2.5 cm wide. They have a single dark purple, dark purple-brown, or black signal patch in the centre of the falls. In the middle of the falls, it also has a row of short hairs called the 'beard', which are yellow tipped with brown, dark brown, black. or dark purple. The upright standards are obovate to oblanceolate, up to 5–8 cm (2–3 in) long and up to 4 cm wide. They can have a slight beard on the claw (the part of the petal closest to the stem). But both falls and standards can be variable (in the wild), in shade, and also the position of the falls can vary, between horizontal and reflexed. It has style branch that is short, and chocolate brown coloured. It has yellow, brown-purple, or brown anthers, and dirty yellow pollen. The perianth tube can be to 4–7 cm (2–3 in) long.

After the iris has flowered, between June and July, it produces a capsule, that is elliptical-oblong, or cylindric, and 5–6 cm (2–2 in) long.

=== Biochemistry ===
As most irises are diploid, having two sets of chromosomes, this can be used to identify hybrids and classification of groupings.

It has a chromosome count of 2n=20, which was counted by M. Gustafsson M. & p. Wendelbo in 1975, (Karyotype analysis and taxonomic comments on irises from SW and C Asia.) Bot. Not. Vol.128 on pages 208–226, (as Iris lineolata and Iris ewbankia) by M. Avishai & D. Zohary in 1977, (Chromosomes in the Oncocylus Irises.) Bot. Gaz. Vol.138 Issue 5 on pages 502–511 and (as Iris lineolata ) by Nazarova in 2004 on pages 1–171 in Chromosome Numbers of Flowering Plants of Armenian Flora.

== Taxonomy ==
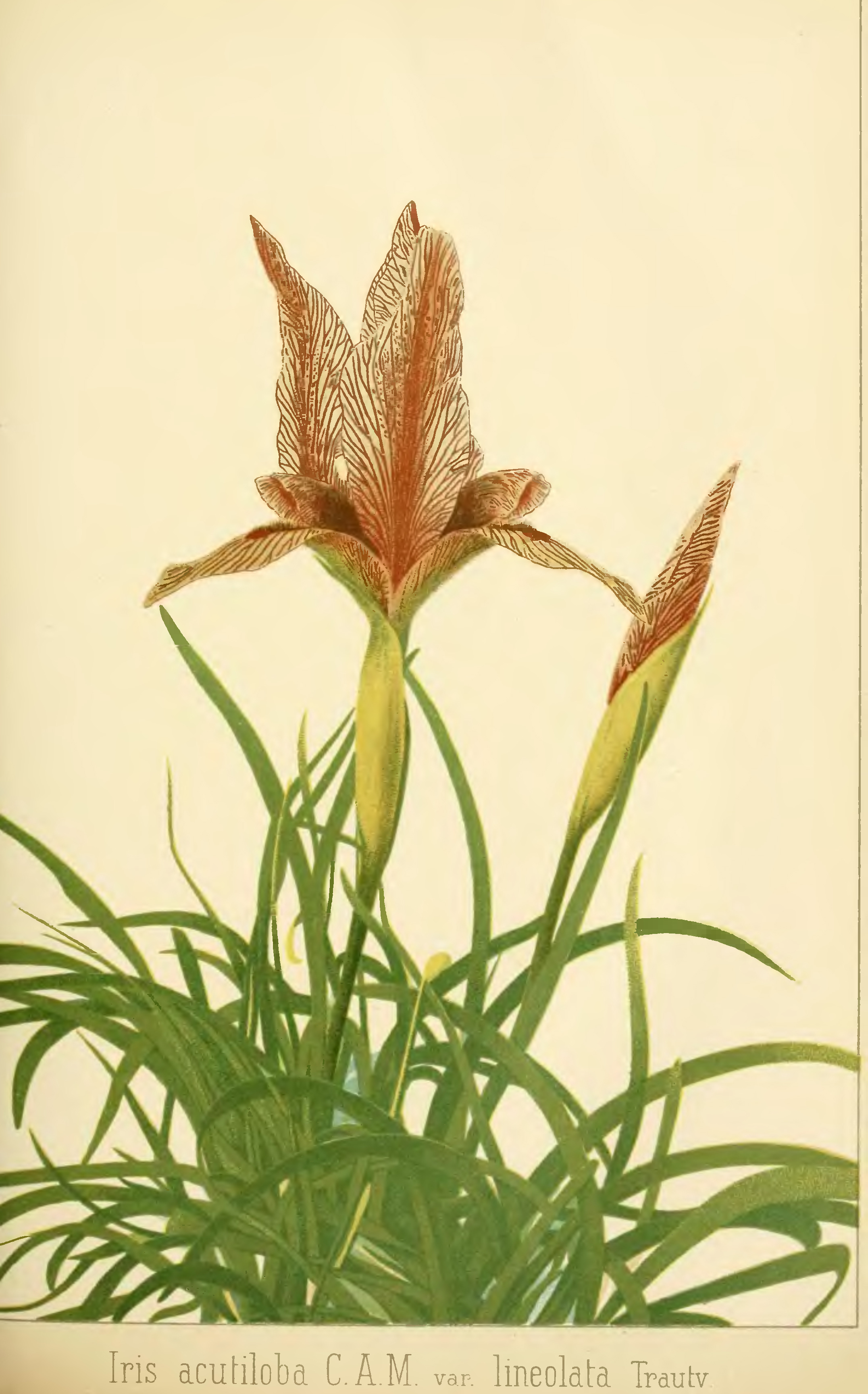
1904 image

The Latin specific epithet lineolata comes from the Latin word linea, meaning ‘line’, and -ola, the latter, a suffix used to indicate small size.

It was first published by Brian Mathew & Per Erland Berg Wendelbo in Fl. Iranica Vol.112 on page 32. in 1975, based on an earlier description by Ernst Rudolf von Trautvetter)

It has two earlier published synonyms Iris ewbankiana and Iris lineolata. Iris ewbankiana (found in Northern Persia,) was published by Sir Michael Foster in The Gardeners' Chronicle 3rd Series Vol.29 on page 397 on 22 June 1901. Foster described it as "a very perky little iris" and its name commemorates the late Rev H. Ewbank. Who was a vicar on the Isle of Wight, before becoming an American Missionary in Syria. Iris lineolata was published by Alexander Alfonsovich Grossheim in Fl. Kavkaza edition 2 Vol.2 page 221 in 1940. Iris lineolata even has its own synonym Iris helena, which was published in 1870 in Wochenschr. Gärtnerei Pflanzenk. Vol.13 on page179 by K.Koch.

In 1982, Brian Mathew re-classified Iris ewbankiana, Iris lineolata and Iris helena as synonyms of Iris acutiloba subsp. lineolata, although several botanists in Russia and Turkey still class Iris ewbankiana and Iris lineolata as separate species.

Iris acutiloba subsp. lineolata was also published in Botanical mag. 9333 in 1933 (with an Illustration) and in the Journal of RHS Vol. 88 on page 56 in 1963 and again in Vol. 93 page 204 in 1968.

It was verified by United States Department of Agriculture and the Agricultural Research Service on 5 October 2016, and is listed in the Encyclopedia of Life, and in the Catalogue of Life.

Iris acutiloba subsp. lineolata is an accepted name by the RHS and is listed in the RHS Plant Finder.

== Distribution and habitat ==
It is native to temperate central Asia, in the region of Transcaucasia.

=== Range ===
It is found in the countries of Iran, (or Persia,) northern Turkey, (and the former USSR states, south of the River Kura,) of Turkmenistan, (including the Kopet Dag Mountains,) Tajikistan, Armenia,(near Vorotan,) Azerbaijan, (in Talysh Mountains,) and Georgia.

=== Habitat ===
It grows on the mountain sides, on dry rocky slopes, dry steppes, grassy slopes, at the fringes of forests. It resides on loose volcanic soils, but also in heavy clay.

They can be found at an altitude of 800 to 2,000 m (2,600 to 6,600 ft) above sea level.

==== Synecology ====
In Golestan National Park, Iran, it grows with white flowered Eremurus kopetdaghensis and Iris kopetdagensis.

In the Talysh Mountains, (between Iran and Azerbaijan), it grows under Paeonia mlokosewitschii, with Fritillaria kotschyana and Iris grossheimiana (another Oncocyclus iris).

In Northern Shirak and Siunik (Sissian and Goris) Provinces of Armenia, it grows with Iris caucasica, Merendera mirzoeval, Colchicum szoritsii, Puschkinia scilloides, Lallemautia caneseeus, Myosotis alpestris, Gladiolus kotschyanus and various species of Draba, Gagea, Pedicularis, Ranunculus, Silene and Trifolium. It grows beside the Vorotan (river) and (near the town of) Kapan with Iris paradoxa, Iris caucasica, Allium stamineum, Bellevalia paradoxa, Bellevalia longystila, Muscari atropatana, Muscari sosnovskyi, Tulipa sosnovskyi, Punica granatum, Vinca vitis sylvestris and Ficus carica (wild).

== Conservation ==
In Turkmenistan, it is a rare species. It only occurs in a single location in Dagestan, within Turkmenistan since 1996, it is protected in Syunt-Khasardag Nature Reserve, and also protected in Shikahogh State Reserve.

It was listed (under Iris ewbankiana) in the Red Data Book of USSR, as an 'Endangered' species. although it was not listed in the first edition of the Red Data Book of Armenia and is not included in the Annexes of CITES and the Bern Convention.

It is affected in Tajikistan by flower collection, in Turkmenistan, the bulbs have been dug up as well as flower collection. In other places, it is affected by habitat destruction by agricultural activity.

== Cultivation ==
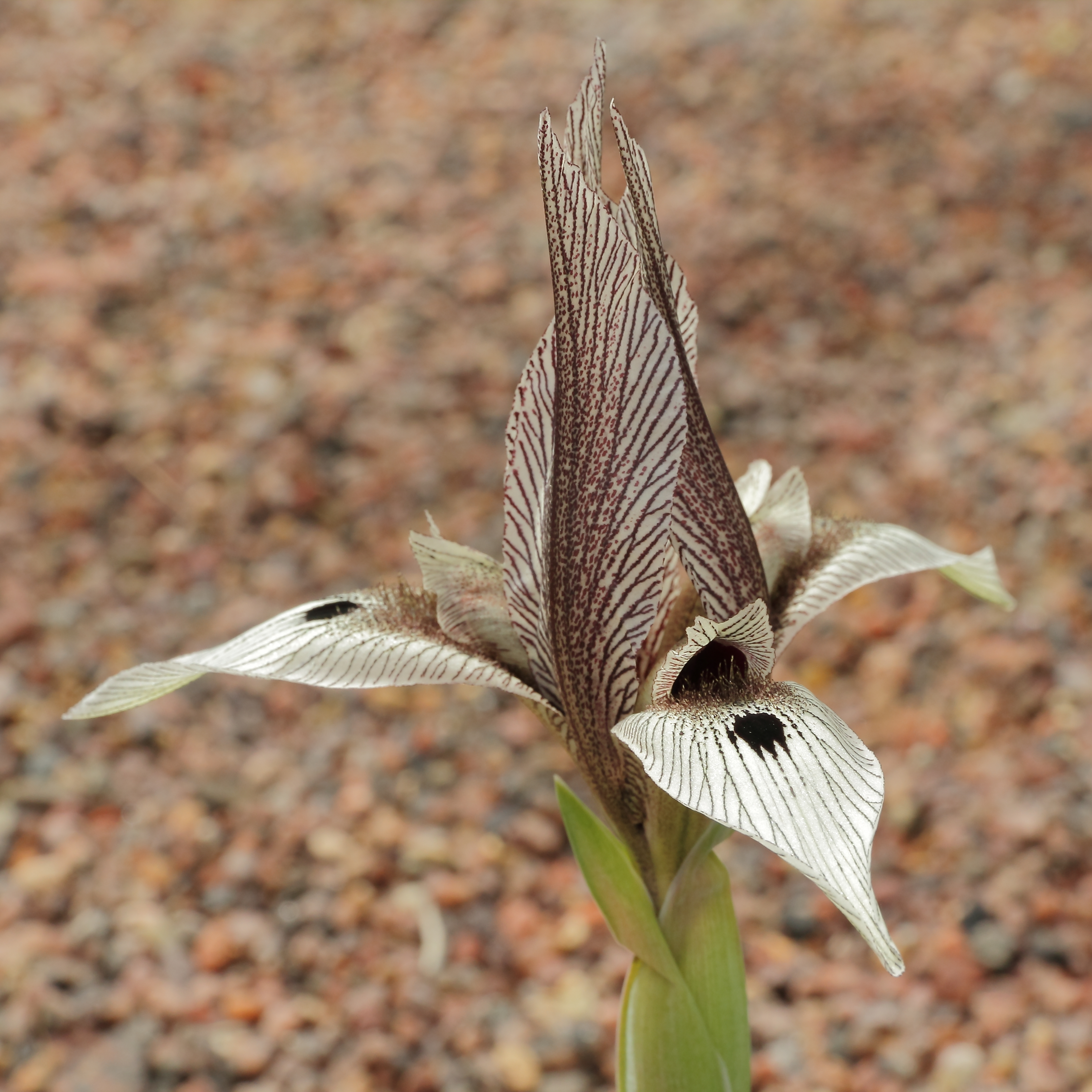

It is rare in cultivation, but thought to be one of the easier Oncocyclus type irises to grow. It prefers to grow in well-drained soils, or if grown in a greenhouse, within a hot sand bed. It prefers soils with a pH level of 7. It prefers positions in full sun.

It is hardy to Kent, in the UK.

=== Propagation ===
Irises can generally be propagated by division, or by seed growing.

== Toxicity ==
Like many other irises, most parts of the plant are poisonous (rhizome and leaves), and if mistakenly ingested can cause stomach pains and vomiting. Also, handling the plant may cause skin irritation or an allergic reaction.

== Sources ==
- Mathew, B. & M. Zarrei 2009. 654. Iris acutiloba subsp. longitepala Curtis's Bot. Mag. 26:253–259.
- Rechinger, K. H., ed. Flora iranica. 1963– (F Iran)
