= Dagestan Nature Reserve =

Nature reserve in Russia

- Russian: Дагестанский заповедник (Also: Dagestansky)
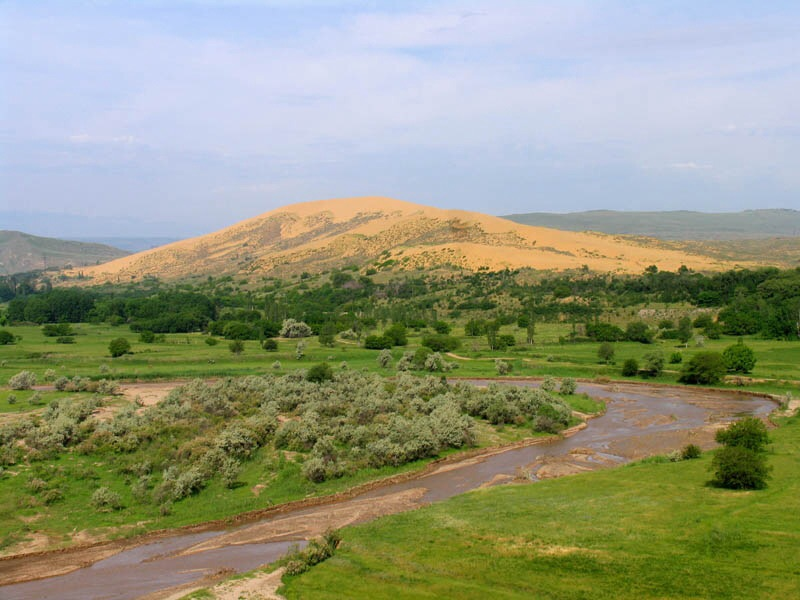
- Sarykum, the largest sand dune in Eurasia

- Location within Russia
- Location: Dagestan
- Nearest city: Makhachkala
- Coordinates: 44°42′3″N 47°0′22″E
- Area: 19,061 hectares (47,101 acres; 74 sq mi)
- Established: 1987
- Governing body: Ministry of Natural Resources and Environment (Russia)
- Website: http://www.dagzapoved.ru/

Dagestan Nature Reserve (Russian: Дагестанский заповедник) (also Dagestansky) is a Russian 'zapovednik' (strict nature reserve) that protects an area of sand dunes and ridges on the northwest coast of the Caspian Sea in the southeast of European Russia. The reserve, a wintering place for migratory birds, is the richest nature reserve in Russia in terms of the number of species - over 300 species have been recorded in the reserve, its buffer zones and subordinate reserves. The reserve is part of several "Important Bird and Biodiversity Areas" (IBAs). The Sarykum sand dune is the highest sand dune in Europe, at 262 m (860 ft). The reserve is situated in the Tarumovsky District of Dagestan.

== Topography ==
The Dagestan Reserve sits on the northwest coast of the Caspian Sea, at the mouth of the Kuma River as it empties into Kizlyar Bay. The reserve covers the low, marshy wetlands of the Kuma delta, as well as the entirety of Kizlyar Bay. Tyuleniy Island lies to the east of the reserve, 43 km (27 mi) from the coast, just outside of the bay. To the north the landscape changes to semi-desert.

The reserve includes four sectors that are disconnected from the Kizlyar Bay territory:

- Sarykum. Sarykum is the highest sand dune in Europe, measuring 262 m (860 ft) in height. The dune is located in an area covered with sand three thousand hectares dotted with peaks; the dune itself covers 1,175 ha (2,900 acres).
- Agrakhan. This area was established in 1983, and added Dagestan reserve in 2009. It was founded for the protection of endangered animal species. It's a long 39,000 ha (96,000-acre) strip of territory on the northern Agrakhan Peninsula along the Caspian Sea that stretches from Chechen' Island south to the Prorez River. Forty endangered species of birds are listed in the Red Book of Russia and the red book of Dagestan, including the Dalmatian pelican or curlew.
- Samur. The Samamur area is located in the forests of the Samur River delta, on the Caspian, covering 11,200 ha (28,000 acres).
- Tlyarata. A mountainous area of 83,500 ha (206,000 acres), established in 1986, the Tlyarata sectors was associated with the Dagestan reserve in 2009. It is located on the northern slopes of the Greater Caucasus to the border of Georgia and Azerbaijan and along the headwaters of Koissou Avar.

== Climate and ecoregion ==
Dagestan is located in the Caspian lowland desert ecoregion. This ecoregion covers the coastal desert - sand dunes, salt deserts, solonchaks (shors) and clay deserts (takyrs) - on the north and east shores of the Caspian Sea. Vegetation is sparse, but highly specialized with mostly halophytes (salt-tolerant plants), shrubs and semi-shrubs.

The climate of Dagestan is Humid continental climate, cool summer (Köppen climate classification (Dwb)). This climate is characterized by high variation in temperature, both daily and seasonally; with dry winters and cool summers. The strong heating of the sand on Sarykoum, the dune reaches temperatures of 55–60 °C (131–140 °F) in the summer. The average temperature in January is −1 °C (30 °F); in August it is +31 °C (88 °F) degrees. Average annual rainfall is 336 millimetres (13.2 in).

== Flora and fauna ==
The plants of the wetlands are mostly reeds with a height of 1.5–3 metres (4.9–9.8 ft). The meadows on drier ground are grasses and sedges. Desert vegetations is represented by saltwort, sagerush-saltwort, wormwood. In the reedlands, the mammals include wild boar, muskrat, nutria, and water rat. On the steppes are hare, fox, and wolf.

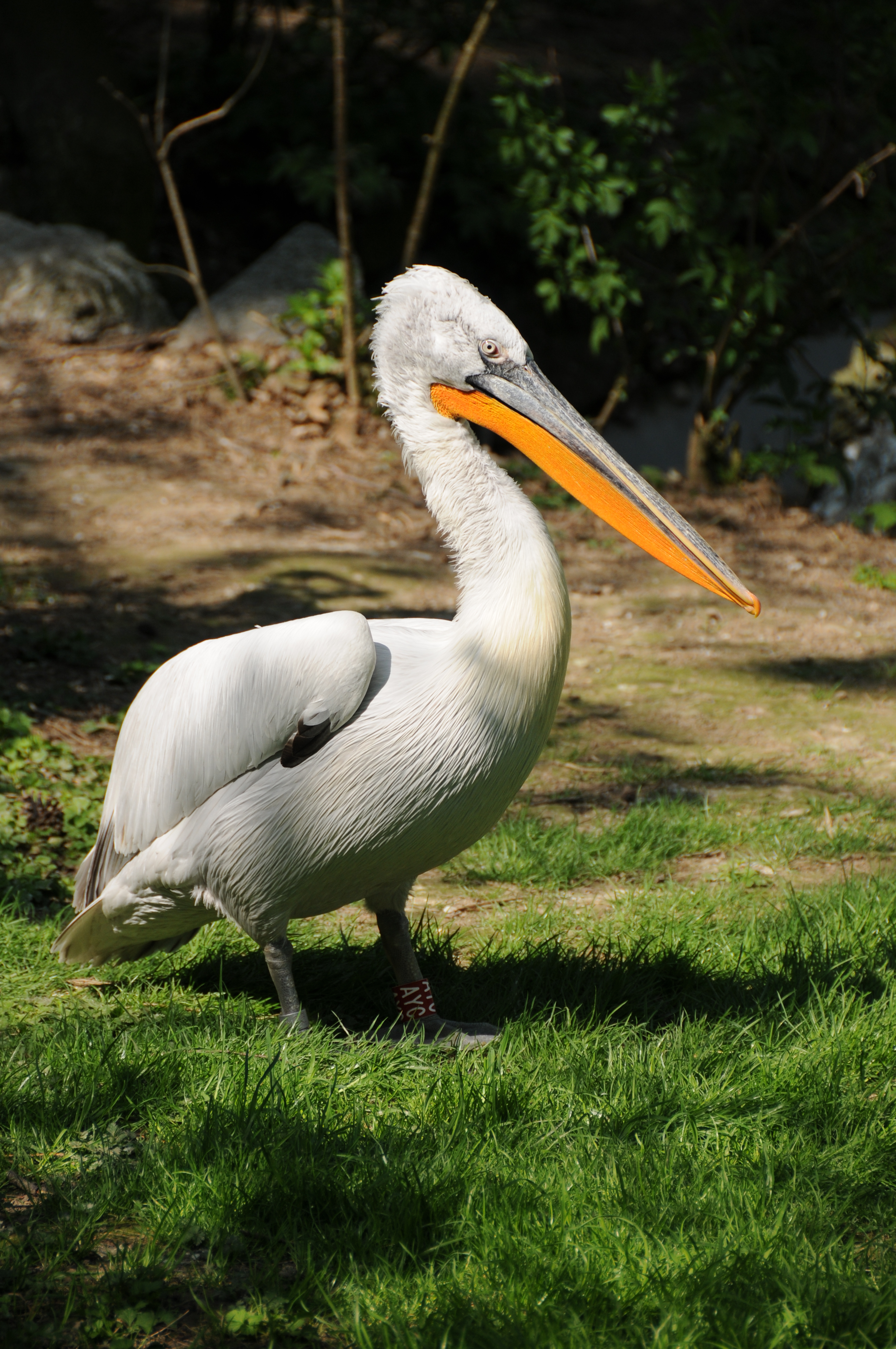
Dalmatian pelican (vulnerable species)

The main focus of the reserve is the birdlife, particularly waterfowl. The boundaries of the main reserve area of the Kuma Delta includes three "Important Bird and Biodiversity Areas" (IBAs) as defined by Birdlife International: "Nizhnekumiskiye floodplains (along the mouth of the Kuma in an area that is about half desert and half riverine grasslands), "Kizlar Bay" (which is about 90% marine, and 10% humid grassland), and "Tyuleni Island" (which is itself mostly wetlands, mudflats, and shingle/stony beach).

Notable species include the vulnerable Dalmatian pelican, one of the largest birds, with a 10-foot (3.0 m) wingspan. On the salt marshes are ibis, herons, terns, stilts, curlew and other waders. During the migrations on the west coast of the Caspian are large numbers of cormorants, grebes, ducks, geese and gulls.

== Ecoeducation and access ==
As a strict nature reserve, the Dagestan Reserve is mostly closed to the general public, although scientists and those with 'environmental education' purposes can make arrangements with park management for visits. Excursions can be arranged by the public. but permits must be obtained in advance. The main office is in the city of Makhachkala.

== See also ==
- List of Russian Nature Reserves (class 1a 'zapovedniks')
- WikiCommons Gallery: Barchan Sary-Kum
