= Kizlyar (disambiguation) =

Kizlyar is a town in the Republic of Dagestan, Russia.

Kizlyar may also refer to:

- Kizlyar Urban Okrug, a municipal formation which the Town of Kizlyar in the Republic of Dagestan, Russia is incorporated as
- Kizlyar, Republic of North Ossetia–Alania, a rural locality (a selo) in Mozdoksky District of the Republic of North Ossetia–Alania, Russia
- Kizlyar Bay, a bay of the Caspian Sea, Russia
