= Puschkinia peshmenii =

Scientific classification
- Kingdom: Plantae
- Clade: Tracheophytes
- Clade: Angiosperms
- Clade: Monocots
- Order: Asparagales
- Family: Asparagaceae
- Subfamily: Scilloideae
- Genus: Puschkinia
- Species: P. peshmenii

Binomial name
- Puschkinia peshmenii Rix & B.Mathew

Species of flowering plant

Puschkinia peshmenii is a bulbous perennial from Turkey and Iran, producing flowers in shades of green in spring.

== Description ==
Puschkinia peshmenii grows from a bulb about 2 cm (0.8 in) across. Each bulb produces one or two linear green leaves, up to 13–22 cm (5.1–8.7 in) long and 5–15 mm (0.2–0.6 in) wide. The flowers are produced in a fairly open raceme (spike), with usually four to nine flowers, but occasionally as few as two. At flowering time the raceme is either the same length as the leaves or less. Individual flowers are borne on short pedicels (stalks), up to 7 mm (0.3 in) long and are turned downwards. The flower has six greenish tepals, with a free part about 7–10 mm (0.3–0.4 in) long and 3 mm (0.1 in) wide, fused at the base into a tube about 3–4 mm (0.1–0.2 in) long. A characteristic of the genus Puschkinia is that the filaments of the stamens are fused to form a "cup" or "corona".

P. peshmenii has been found in extreme south-eastern Turkey, in the provinces of Van and Hakkâri, where it grows on rocky hillsides, often near late melting patches of snow, at around 1,800 m (5,900 ft), flowering in May. It has also been recorded from western Iran.

== Systematics ==
The species was named in 2007 by Martyn Rix and Brian Mathew. The specific epithet peshmenii commemorates the Turkish botanist Hasan Peşmen (1939–1980), who discovered the species in 1974, and was later killed in a road accident. Formerly the genus Puschkinia was considered to contain only a single variable species, P. scilloides. Among other differences, P. peshmenii has green rather than blue flowers, which open when the leaves are well developed rather than when they have only just emerged, consistent with its flowering some weeks later when both species are grown together in cultivation.

== Cultivation ==
The species is rare in cultivation, but has been grown since the mid-1970s in a bulb frame in the south of England, where it has persisted but increased only very slowly.
