= Agrakhan Peninsula =

Аграханский полуостров
- Location within Caspian Sea

Geography
- Coordinates: 43°50′N 47°36′E
- Adjacent to: Caspian Sea
- Area: 212 km^{2} (82 sq mi)
- Highest elevation: 20 m (70 ft)

Administration
- Russia
- Dagestan Republic

The Agrakhan Peninsula (Russian: Аграханский полуостров) is a narrow peninsula in the Caspian Sea. It is located on the northwestern Caspian coast. The peninsula stretches northwards in a N/S orientation. It is long and narrow, with a length of 50 km and a width of 8 km. Chechen Island lies off its northern end, separated from the peninsula by a narrow sound.

The Agrakhan Peninsula belongs to the Dagestan Republic, a federal subject of the Russian Federation.

== Ecology ==
The Agrakhan Peninsula is a refuge for a variety of marine birds who are protected at the northern end by the Dagestan Nature Reserve. The protected area was established in 1983 and added to the Dagestan reserve in 2009. It's a long 39,000 ha (96,000-acre) strip of territory on the northern Agrakhan Peninsula along the Caspian Sea that stretches from Chechen Island south to the Prorez River. It was founded for the protection of endangered animal species, including forty endangered species of birds that are listed in the Red Book of Russia and the red book of Dagestan, including the Dalmatian pelican or curlew.

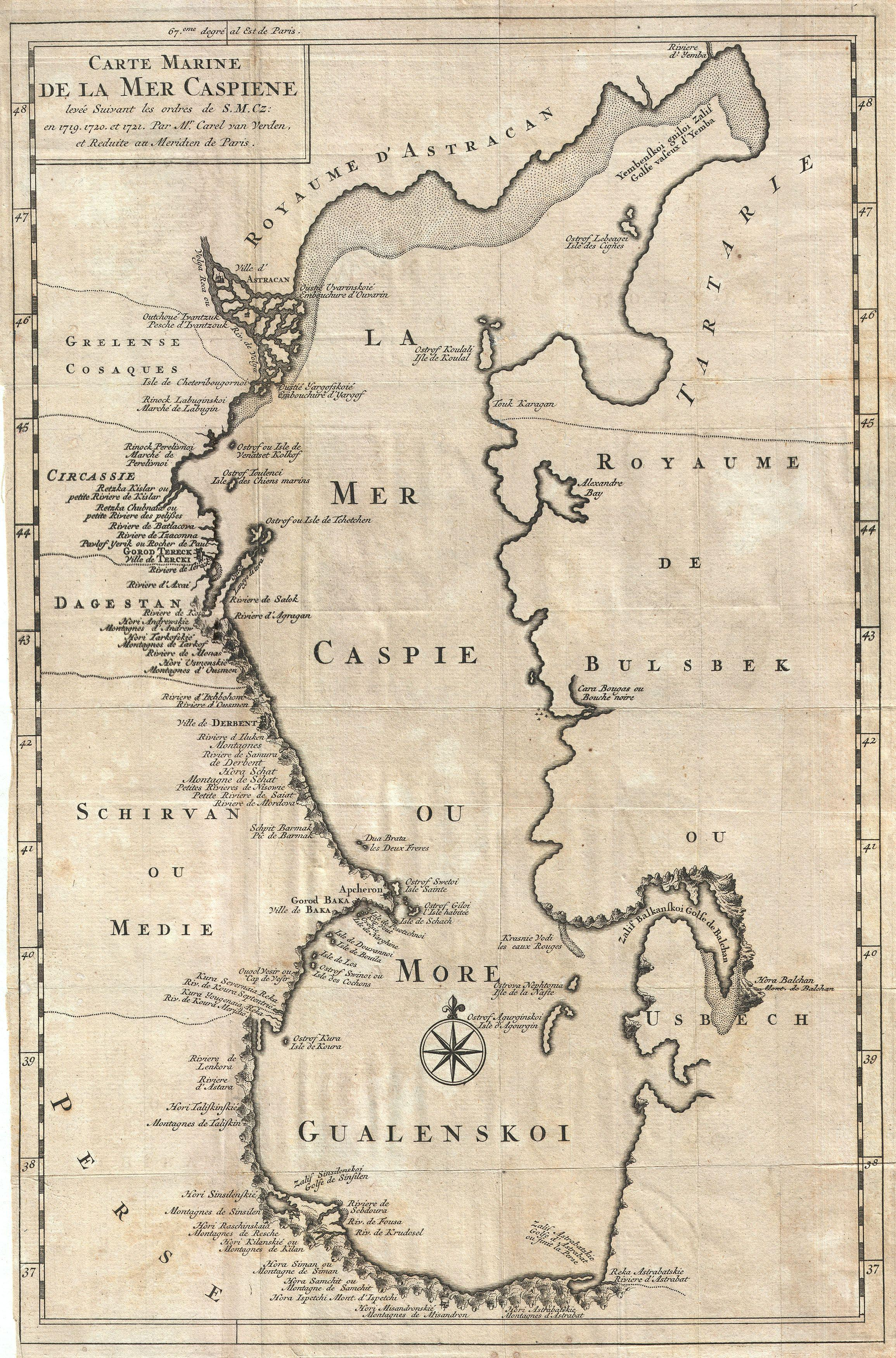
1721 Van Verden map of the Caspian Sea with the Agrakhan Peninsula and Chechen Island.

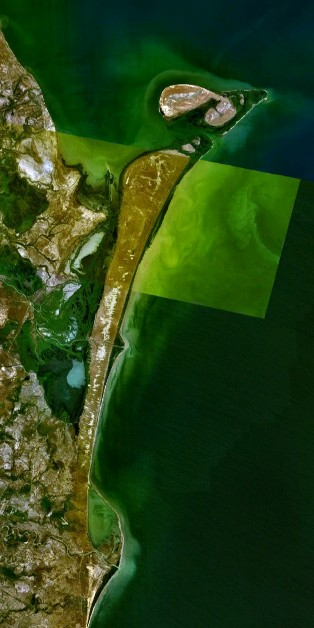
Aerial picture of the Agrakhan Peninsula.
