= Chechen Lighthouse =

Chechen lighthouse
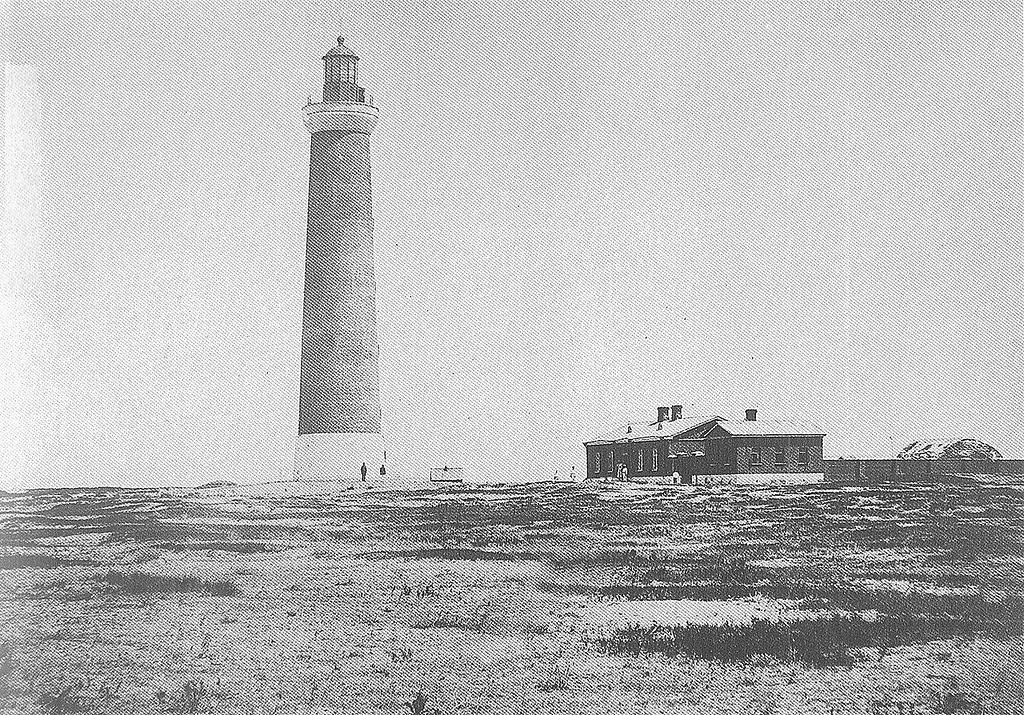
- Lighthouse on Chechen Island, 1870–1880
- Location: Chechen Island; Russia
- Coordinates: 43.971223°N 47.639422°E

Tower
- Constructed: 1863 (first)
- Construction: masonry tower
- Automated: 1970
- Height: 41 m (135 ft)
- Shape: cylindrical tower with balcony and lantern
- Markings: red tower and lantern

Light
- First lit: 1863 (current)
- Focal height: 41 m (135 ft)

The Chechen Lighthouse is located on Chechen Island in the northwestern part of the Caspian Sea. It is the only historical landmark on the island and was built by English builders in 1863.

== History ==
The lighthouse is located on the western tip of Chechen Island, off the western coast of the Caspian Sea, three miles north of the Agrakhan Peninsula.

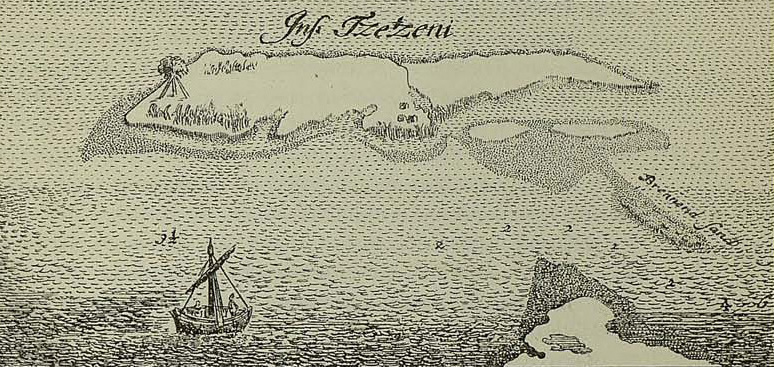
On the image Adam Olearius in 1636–1638 a man-made lighthouse is depicted on the left side of the Chechen Island.

German traveler Adam Oleari first mentioned the island in his work "Description of a Journey to Muscovy", which is about his journey through Russia as part of Schleswig-Holstein's embassy to Persia in 1636–1638. He reported that, at one of the extremities of the island four poles were tied together and covered with roots and branches; there were also two large pits where a fire was laid out at night. Signal lights, which depicted the appearance of lighthouses, for the passage of sea vessels were lit as early as 1723.

In 1855, the commander of the Astrakhan port, captain of the 1st rank R. G. Mashin, having examined the shores of the Caspian Sea, proposed "to protect sailors from a spit stretching along the parallel from the island to the east." R. G. Mashin himself developed a construction plan and submitted it to the manager of the Naval Ministry and the Hydrographic Department.

The construction of the lighthouse by English builders began in 1859, with Lieutenant Kozlovsky supervising the construction. In 1860, a diopter apparatus of the 2nd category was delivered from France. It was installed and regulated by Jan Ilves, master of the lighthouse workshop of the Baltic Sea Lighthouse Directorate. On October 11 of 1863, the lighthouse began to shine. The tower is painted in red and stands 41.1 meters above sea level and 38 meters from the base. The lighthouse tower has 5 windows and 196 steps inside. The white light flashes constantly, illuminating the entire horizon. There is a one-story house, a bathhouse and a pantry near the tower.

== Gallery ==
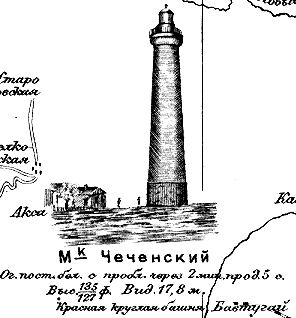
Lighthouse on the map of the Hydrographic Office. Depth measurement in the 1870s

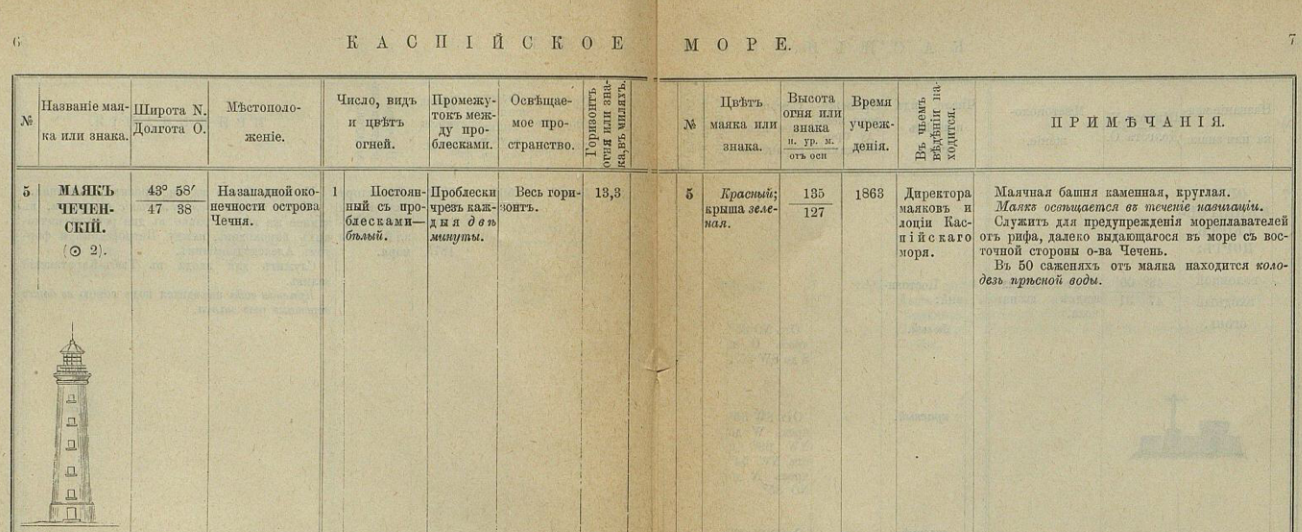
Publication of the Main Hydrographic Department of the Marine Ministry. - St. Petersburg 1905. Description of the Chechen Lighthouse

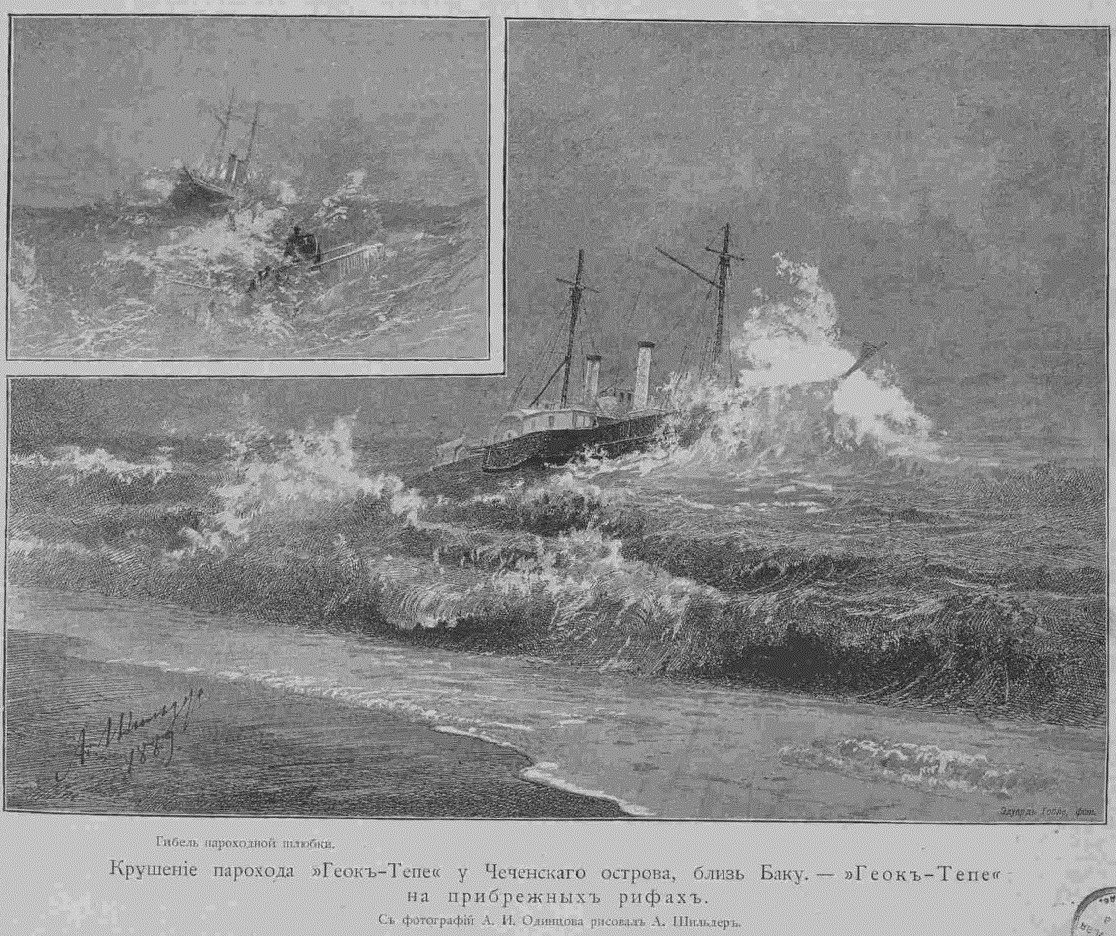
The wreck of the Geok-Tepe a sinking ship near the Chechen Islands. Drawing/painting by A. N. Schilder (1889)

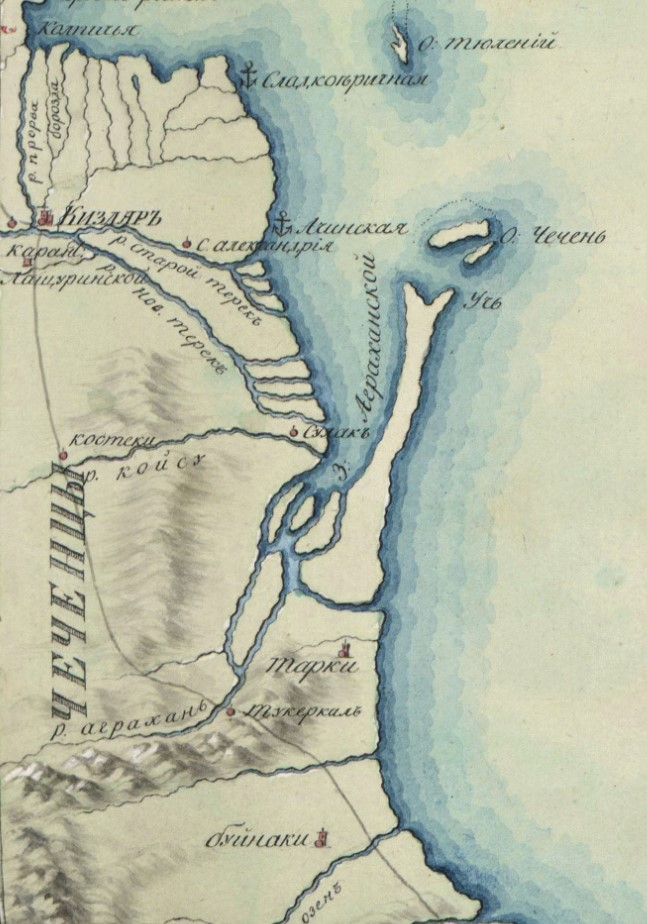
Chechen Island and Chechens (1813)
