= Sarykum =

Large sand dune in Dagestan, Russia

Sarykum Сары-Кум / Sarigum
- Sand dune
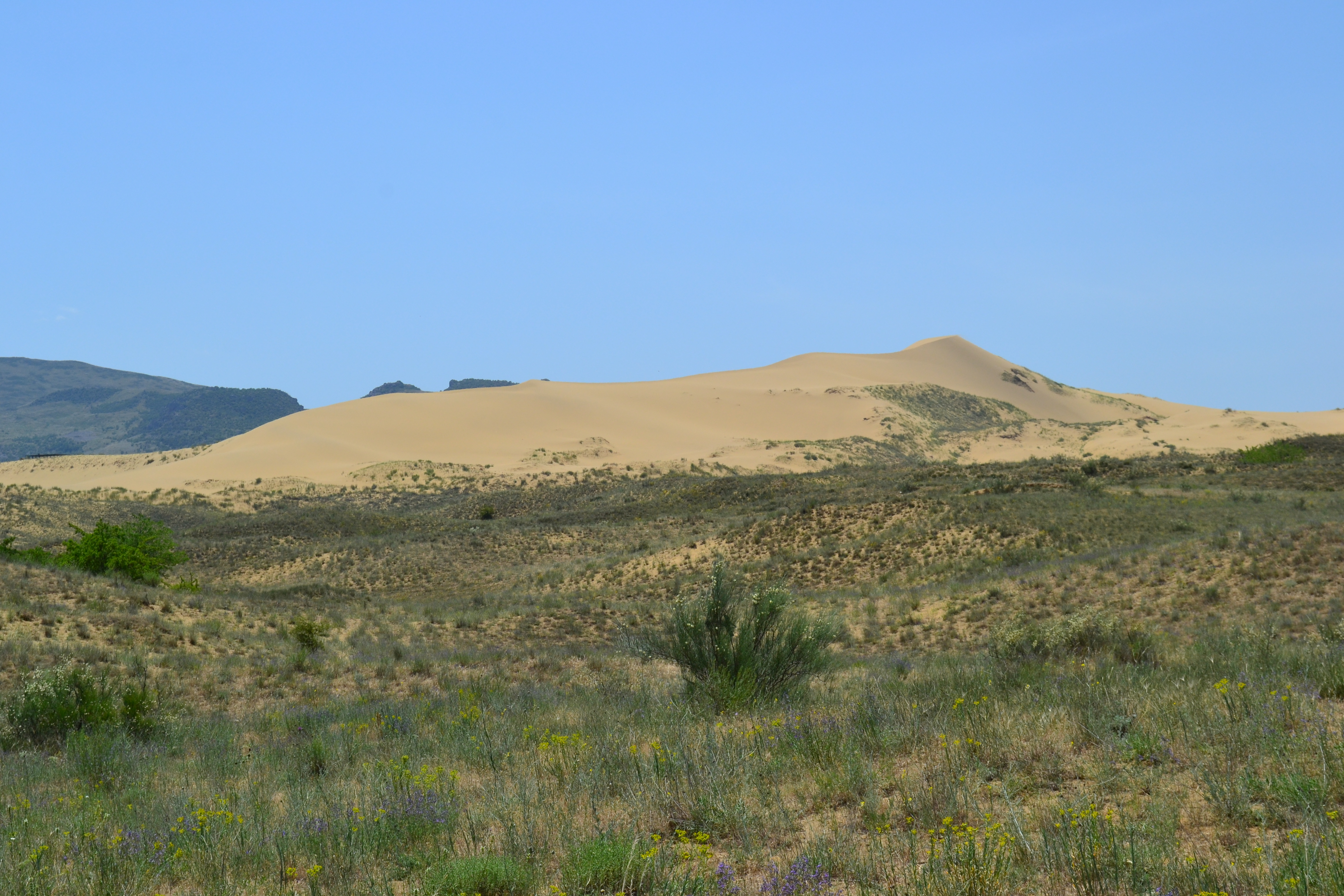
- Sarykum Sand Dune

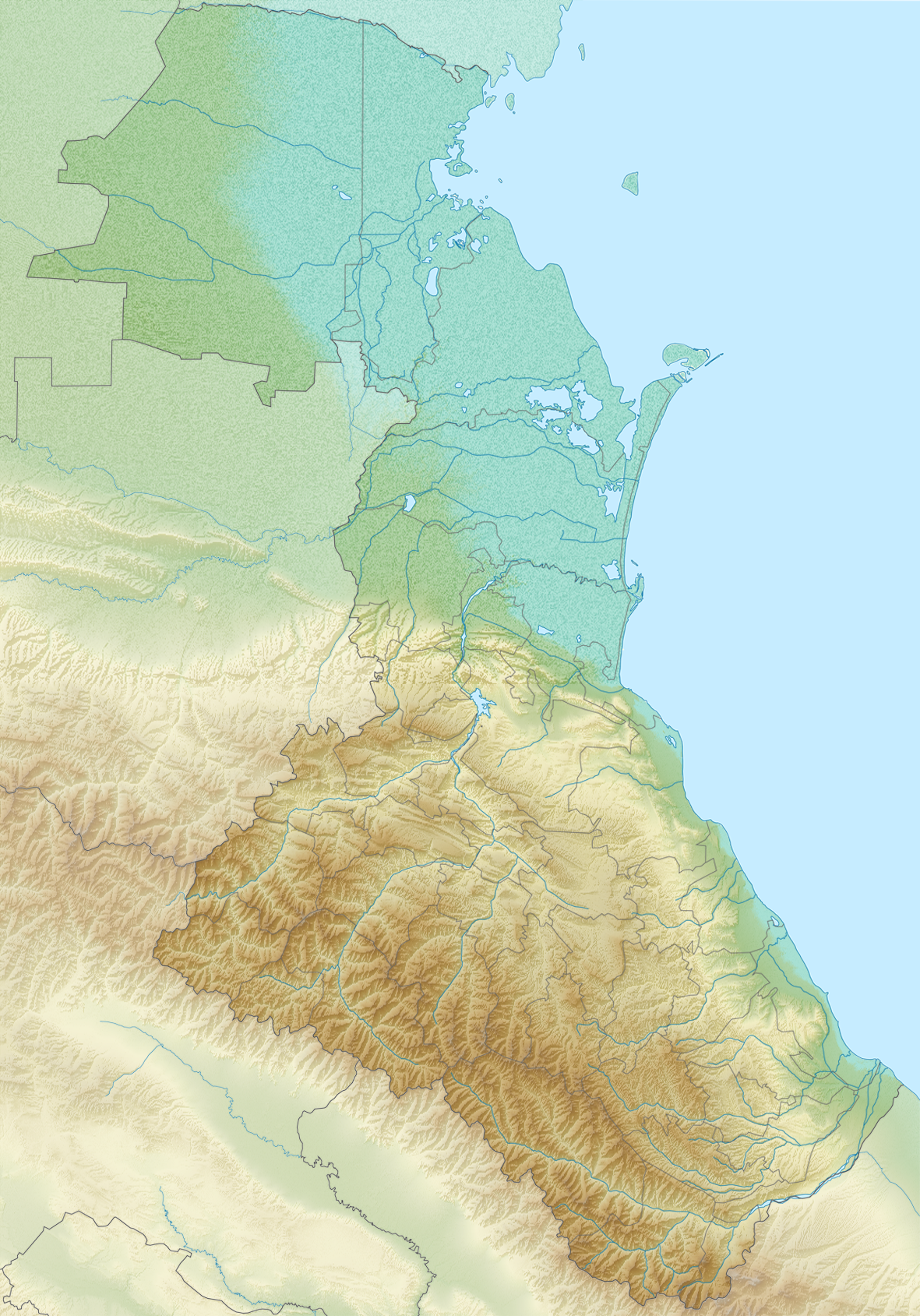
- Location of Sarykum in Dagestan
- Coordinates: 43°0′36″N 47°14′13″E
- Location: Kumtorkalinsky District, Dagestan, Russian Federation.

Area
  - Total: 1,175 hectares (2,900 acres)
- Elevation: 262 m (860 ft)

Sarykum or Sary-Kum (Russian: Сары-Кум, Kumyk: Sari Hum, meaning "Yellow sand") is a large sand dune located in the Kumtorkalinsky District of Dagestan, Russian Federation. It is one of the largest sand dunes in Eurasia. The dune is located in a protected area, part of the Dagestan Nature Reserve, which was established on 9 January 1987.

== Geography ==
The dune rises about 18 kilometres (11 mi) northwest of Makhachkala. Sarykum is the highest dune of the Sarykumskye Barchany (Russian: Сарыкумские барханы) dune area, which extends below the northern slopes of the Narat-Tyube Range (Russian: Нарат-Тюбе).

The Sarykum dune is very old. Measuring approximately 3 kilometres (1.9 mi) in length, with an area of 1,175 hectares (2,900 acres), the height of the highest summit may vary between 213 metres (699 ft) and 262 metres (860 ft).

== Flora ==
The Sarykum area is a refuge for desert flora in the region. There are up to 279 species of rare plants, including several which are endemic, such as Iris acutiloba, Shishkin's groundsel (Senecio schischkinii), Karakugen milkvetch, Astragalus karakugensis and Colchicum laetum.
