= Chechen Island =

Island in Caspian Sea, Russia

Russian: Остров Чечень
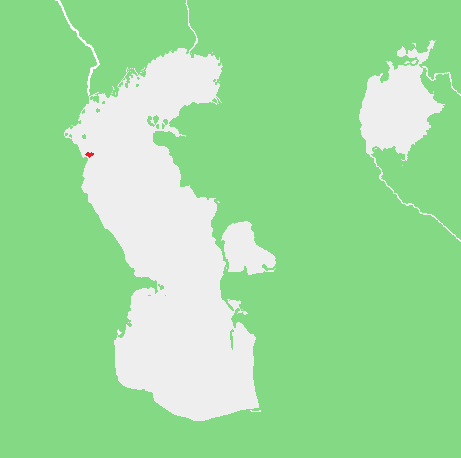
- Location of Chechen Island

Geography
- Location: Caspian Sea
- Coordinates: 43.966°N 47.756°E
- Area: 55 km^{2} (21 sq mi)
- Length: 15 km (9.3 mi)
- Width: 10 km (6 mi)

Administration
- Russia
- Republic: Dagestan

Demographics
- Population: No permanent residents

Chechen Island (Note: Also spelled Chechen' Island.) (/ˈtʃɛtʃɛn/; Russian: Остров Чечень, romanized: Ostrov Chechen') is a coastal island on the western shore of the Caspian Sea. It is located 20 km east of Krainovka right off the headland on the northern tip of the Agrakhan Peninsula. This island belongs to the Republic of Dagestan, a federal subject of the Russian Federation.

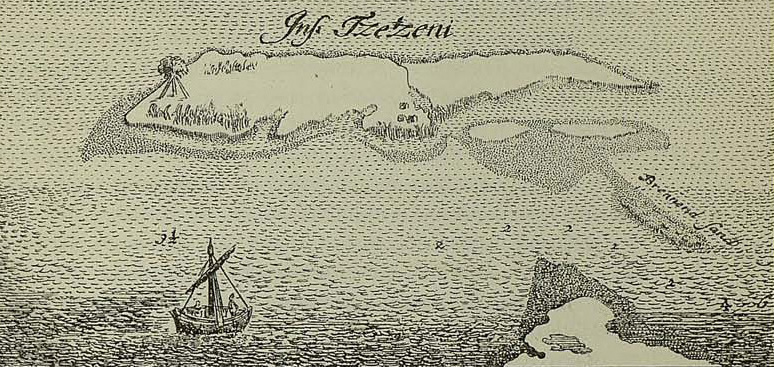
Chechen' Island (1636—1638)

The island has a length of 15 kilometres (9 mi) and a maximum width of 10 km. The sea around Chechen Island usually freezes between January and March. Adjacent islands include Lopatin Island (also known as Lopatina), Bazar, Prygunki, Pichuzhonok and Yaichnyy Island and are collectively known as the 'Chechen Archipelago'.

== History ==
One of the islands first mentions was around 1500 under the name sicamatela on an Italian map. The island is named after the Chechens. According to the Russian geographer and military man, the Chechens were previously settled up to the sea. German explorer Samuel Gmelin, who visited the area up until 1774, mentions how Chechens would go fishing on the island.

In the morning of the tenth day of the month at about 7 o'clock we left for the island of Chechen'. It got its name from an ethnic group that lives in the mountains - Chechens. They go fishing here.

— Samuel Gottlieb Gmelin

In 1863 the lighthouse on the island was built by English builders.

In tsarist times, the island was used as a place of exile. During the Civil War, being an important stronghold of oil shipping, it changed hands. In 1918, the British established a naval aviation base on the island, their intention was to use it for bombing the ships of the Volga flotilla based in Astrakhan. In April 1920, by the forces of the Volga-Caspian military flotilla, the Russian SFSR took control of the island.

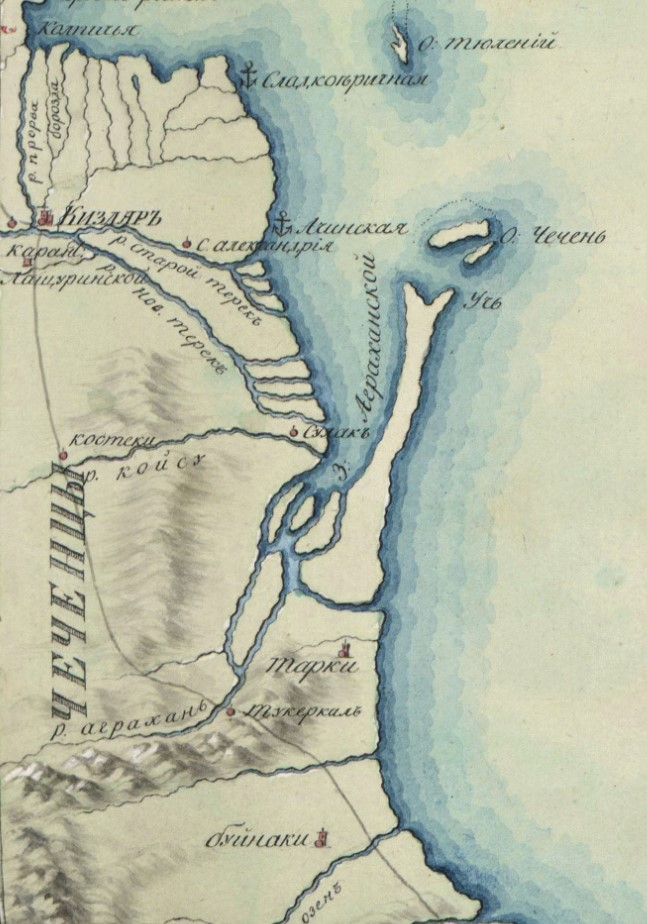
Chechen Island and Chechens (1813)

== Ecology ==
There are many birds on Chechen Island, especially seagulls. In very cold winters herds of Saiga tatarica find refuge in the island.

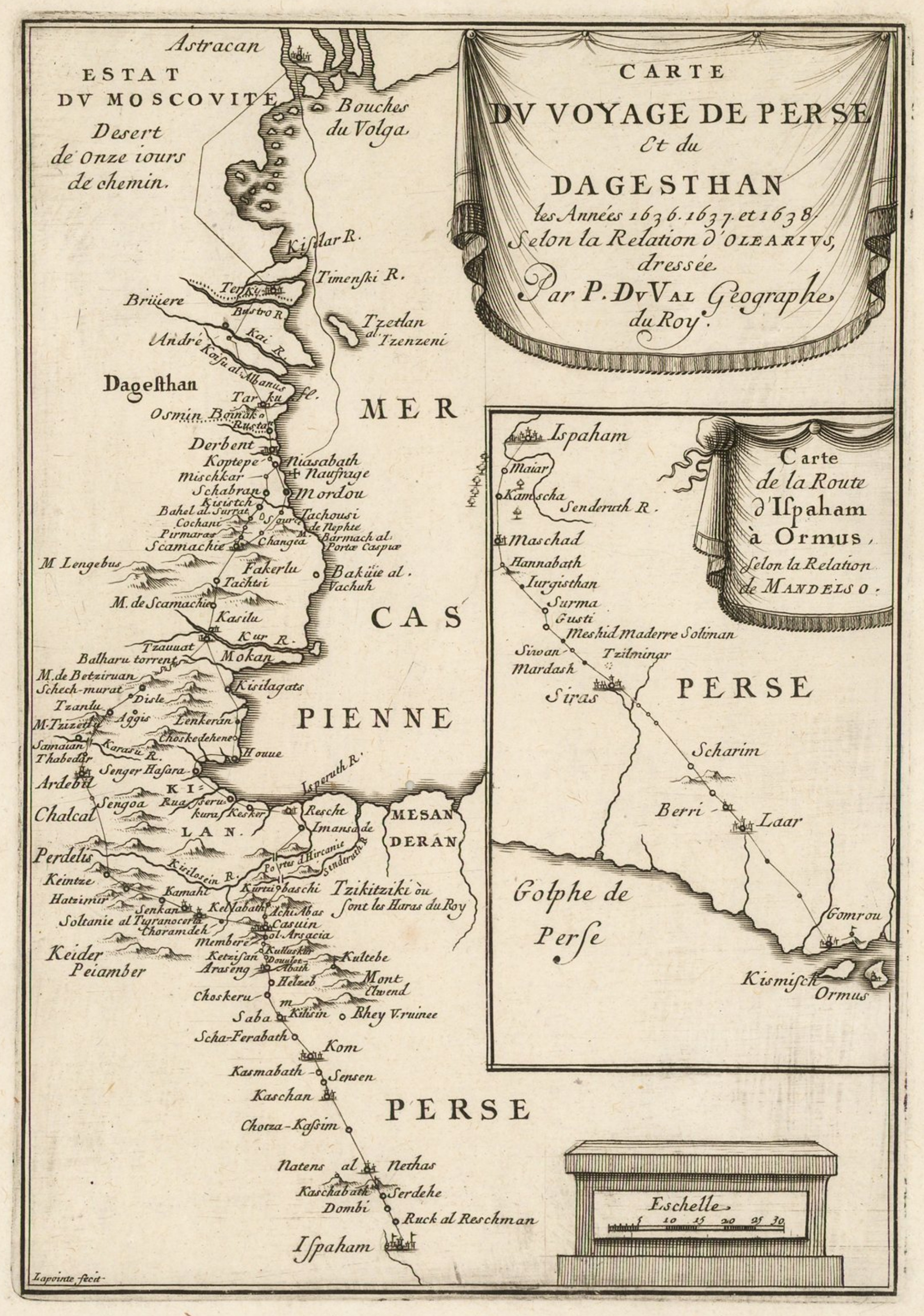
1665 Pierre Duval map of the Caspian Sea with Chechen Island.

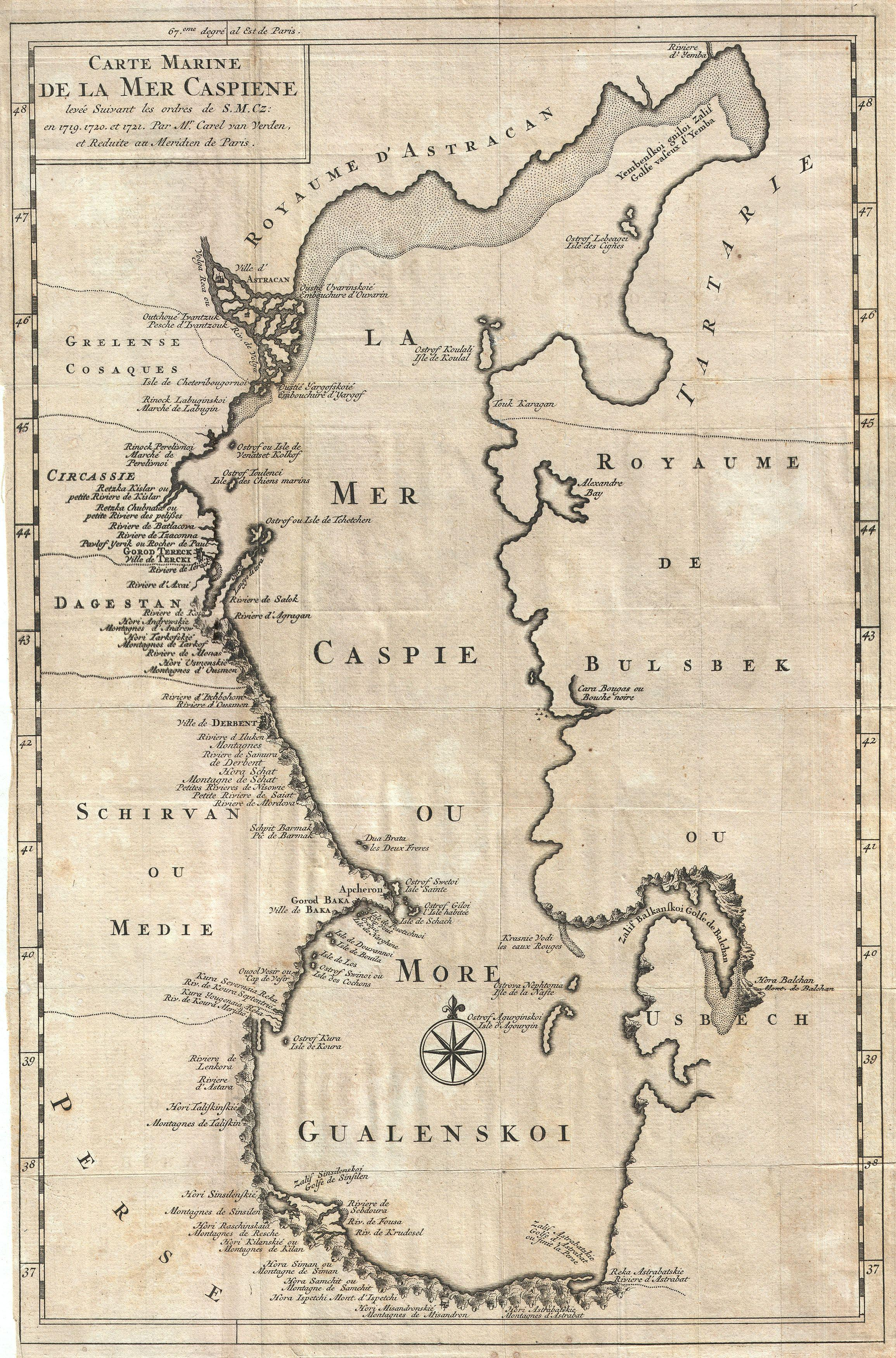
1721 Van Verden map of the Caspian Sea with Chechen Island.

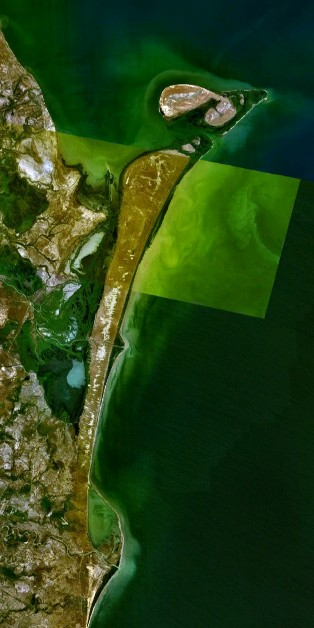
Aerial picture of the Agrakhan Peninsula with Chechen Island off its northern tip.
