= Kizlyar Bay =

- Кизлярский залив
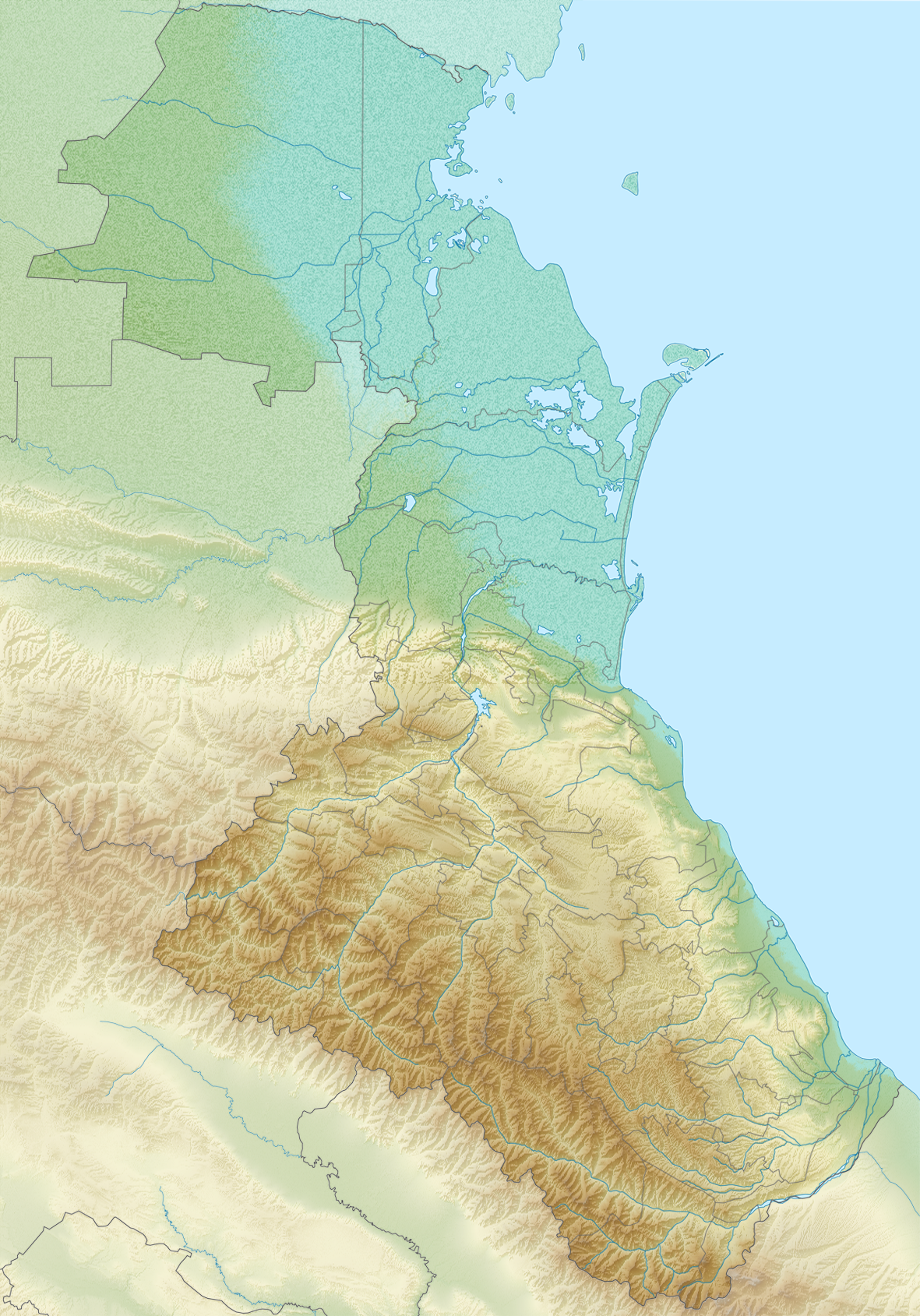
- Location in Dagestan
- Location: Dagestan, Russian Federation
- Coordinates: 44°34′30″N 46°59′58″E
- River sources: Kuma, Prorva and Talovka
- Ocean/sea sources: Caspian Sea
- Basin countries: Russia
- Max. length: 20 km (12 mi)
- Max. width: 40 km (25 mi)
- Average depth: 4 m (13 ft)
- Islands: Tyuleniy Island
- Settlements: 0

The Kizlyar Bay (Russian: Кизлярский залив Kizlyarskiy Zaliv) is a bay of the Caspian Sea located in the Republic of Dagestan, Russian Federation.

If the plans for the proposed Eurasia Canal, linking the Caspian Sea with the Black Sea, are ever implemented, it will likely have the Kizlyar Bay as its eastern end.

== Geography ==
The bay cuts 20 km (12 mi) deep into the Dagestan seashore. It is 40 km (25 mi) wide and has a maximum depth of 4 m (13 ft). Tyuleniy Island lies near the entrance to the bay.

The Kuma, Prorva and Talovka rivers discharge into the bay, reducing the salinity to 5 PPT.

== Protected area ==
The Dagestan Nature Reserve is a protected areacovers the entire area of the gulf, including the island of Morskoy Biryuchok. The hinterland is a low and marshy area of wetlands. The large Sarykum dune, located in another area further to the south, is part of the reserve.
