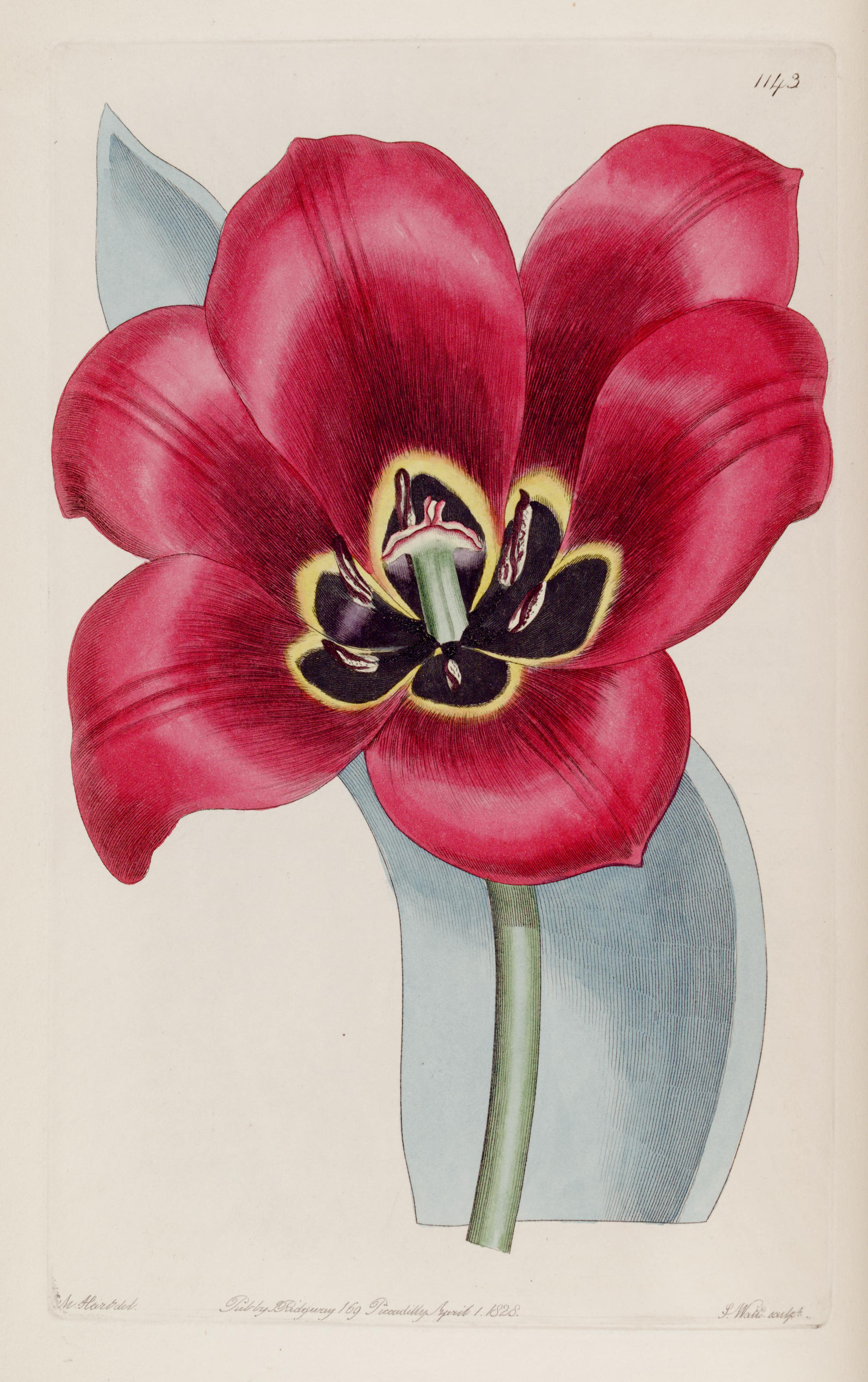
- Botanical illustration

Scientific classification
- Kingdom: Plantae
- Clade: Tracheophytes
- Clade: Angiosperms
- Clade: Monocots
- Order: Liliales
- Family: Liliaceae
- Subfamily: Lilioideae
- Tribe: Lilieae
- Genus: Tulipa
- Species: T. persica

Binomial name
- Tulipa persica (Lindl.) Sweet

Synonyms
- Tulipa oculus-solis var. persica Lindl.

= Tulipa persica =

Species of plant

Tulipa persica is a species of flowering plant in the family Liliaceae, native to northwestern Iran. A bulbous geophyte, it is hardy to USDA zone 3a.
