= Tyuleny Island (Caspian Sea) =

Island in the Caspian Sea

Tyuleny Тюлений
- Island
- Location within Caspian Sea
- Coordinates: 44°29′N 47°31′E
- Country: Russian Federation
- Federal subject: Dagestan Republic

Tyuleny Island (Russian: Тюлений) is an uninhabited island in the Caspian Sea. It belongs to the Dagestan Republic, a federal subject of the Russian Federation.

== Geography ==
The island is located 47 km (29 miles) east of the Dagestan coastline, in the Caspian Sea, near the entrance to the Kizlyar Gulf.10 kilometres (6.2 miles) long and 6 kilometres (3.7 miles) wide. There is a weather station on it.

=== Environment ===
There are many Caspian seals in Tyuleny, hence its name, which means "seal" in Russian. Since parts of the islands are marshy, there are also many birds. The island has been designated an Important Bird Area (IBA) by BirdLife International because it supports significant numbers of Dalmatian pelicans, little bustards and great cormorants on passage.

=== Climate ===
Tyuleny Island has a cold desert climate (Köppen BWk). The annual precipitation for Tyuleny island is 187 mm (7.36 in), so it is the driest region in Russia.

Climate data for Tyuleny Island (1991–2020 normals, extremes 1959–present)
Month	Jan	Feb	Mar	Apr	May	Jun	Jul	Aug	Sep	Oct	Nov	Dec	Year
Record high °C (°F)	10.1 (50.2)	12.7 (54.9)	18.5 (65.3)	28.0 (82.4)	31.0 (87.8)	35.7 (96.3)	37.5 (99.5)	37.9 (100.2)	33.4 (92.1)	26.1 (79.0)	21.4 (70.5)	13.6 (56.5)	37.9 (100.2)
Mean daily maximum °C (°F)	1.8 (35.2)	2.2 (36.0)	6.8 (44.2)	14.3 (57.7)	21.6 (70.9)	27.3 (81.1)	29.8 (85.6)	29.2 (84.6)	23.6 (74.5)	16.7 (62.1)	9.3 (48.7)	4.0 (39.2)	15.6 (60.0)
Daily mean °C (°F)	−0.3 (31.5)	−0.2 (31.6)	4.1 (39.4)	11.0 (51.8)	18.2 (64.8)	23.7 (74.7)	26.3 (79.3)	25.8 (78.4)	20.5 (68.9)	14.0 (57.2)	7.0 (44.6)	2.0 (35.6)	12.7 (54.8)
Mean daily minimum °C (°F)	−2.3 (27.9)	−2.2 (28.0)	2.1 (35.8)	8.6 (47.5)	15.4 (59.7)	20.7 (69.3)	23.2 (73.8)	22.7 (72.9)	17.9 (64.2)	11.7 (53.1)	5.0 (41.0)	0.1 (32.2)	10.2 (50.4)
Record low °C (°F)	−24.3 (−11.7)	−25.0 (−13.0)	−16.4 (2.5)	−1.9 (28.6)	4.9 (40.8)	8.6 (47.5)	15.5 (59.9)	9.8 (49.6)	3.6 (38.5)	−7.0 (19.4)	−15.3 (4.5)	−16.7 (1.9)	−25.0 (−13.0)
Average precipitation mm (inches)	12 (0.5)	11 (0.4)	14 (0.6)	19 (0.7)	24 (0.9)	15 (0.6)	15 (0.6)	16 (0.6)	14 (0.6)	20 (0.8)	13 (0.5)	14 (0.6)	187 (7.4)
Source: Погода и Климат

== Features ==
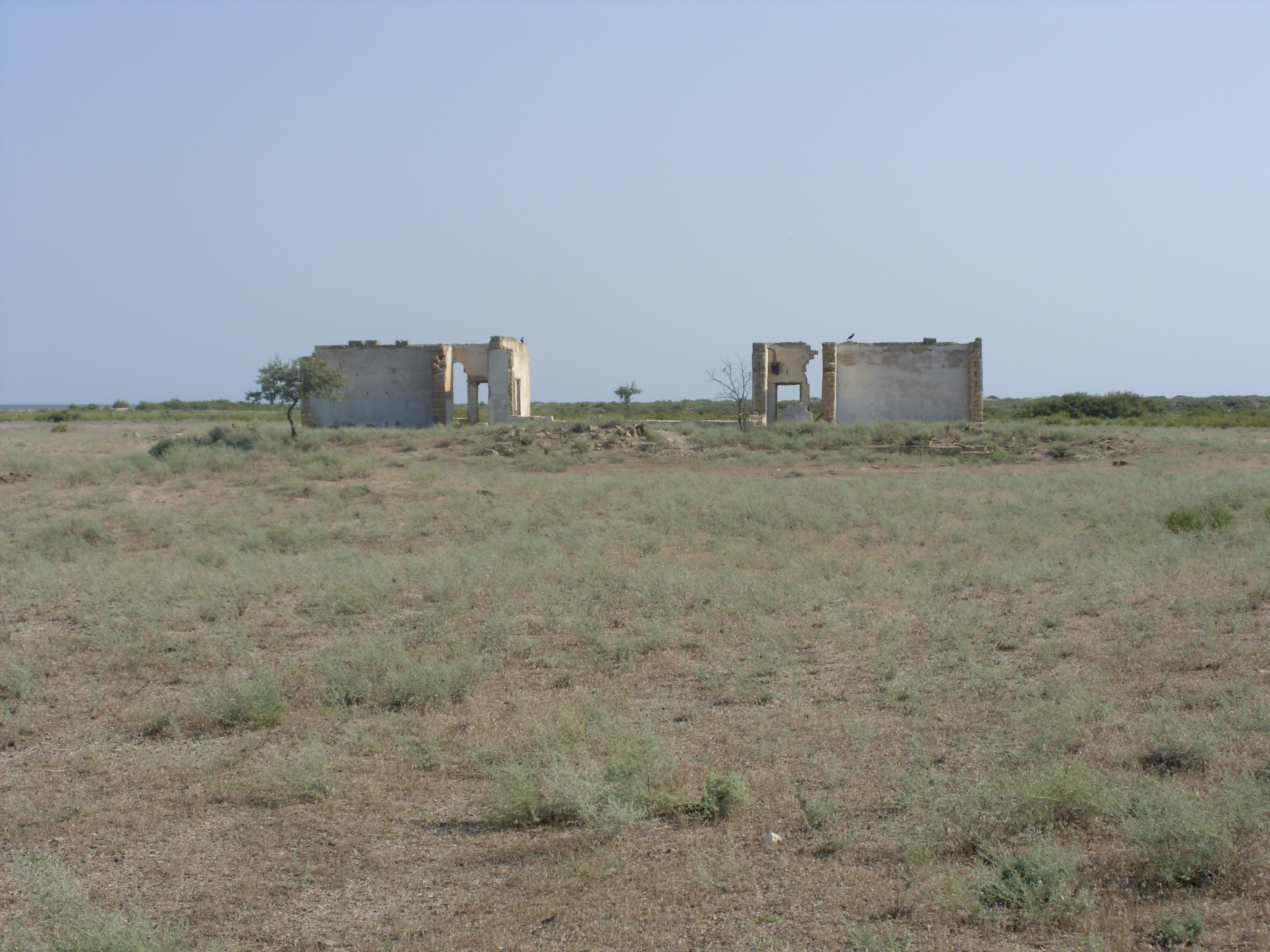
Ruins of school

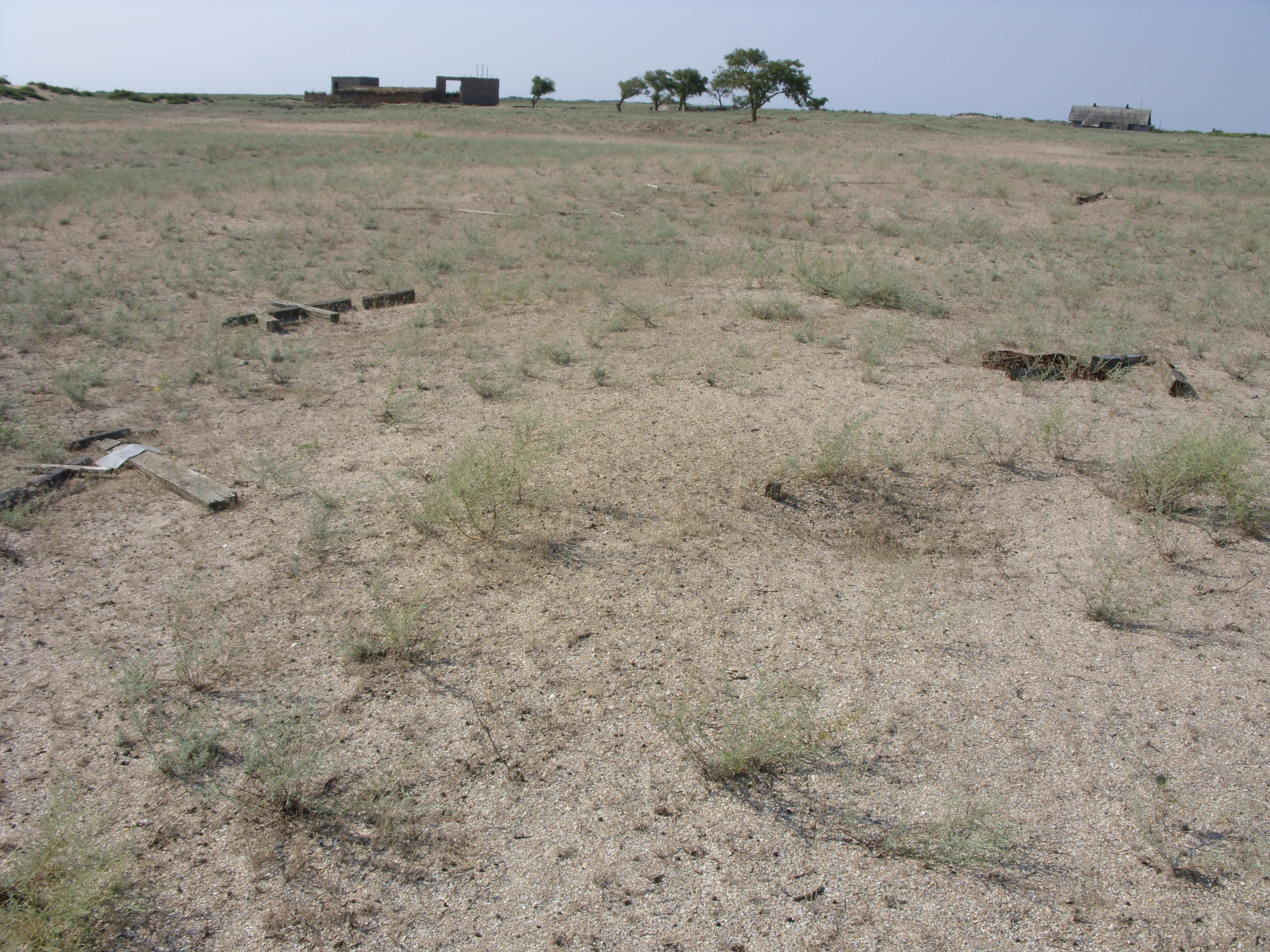
Cemetery

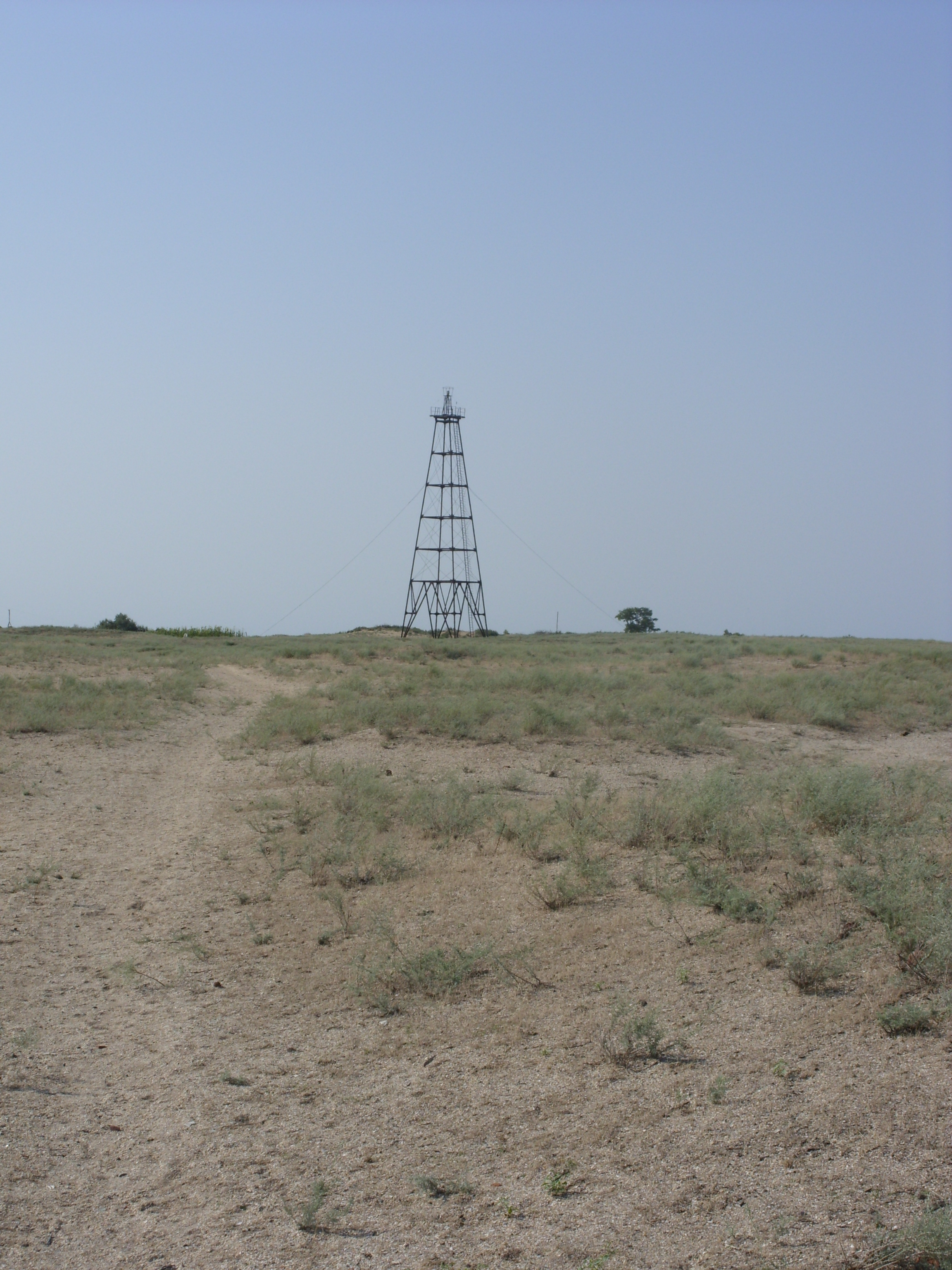
lighthouse

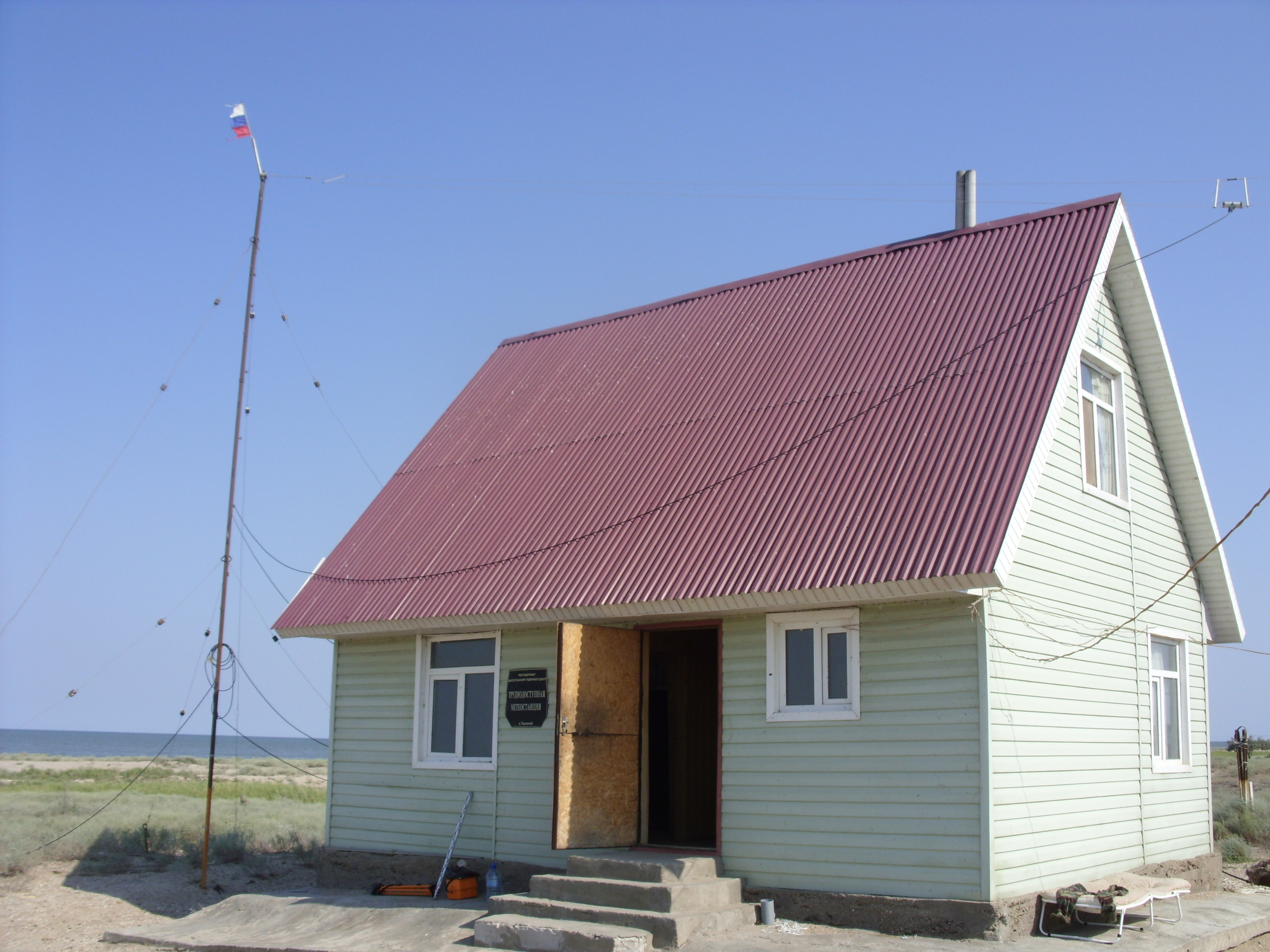
Weather Station

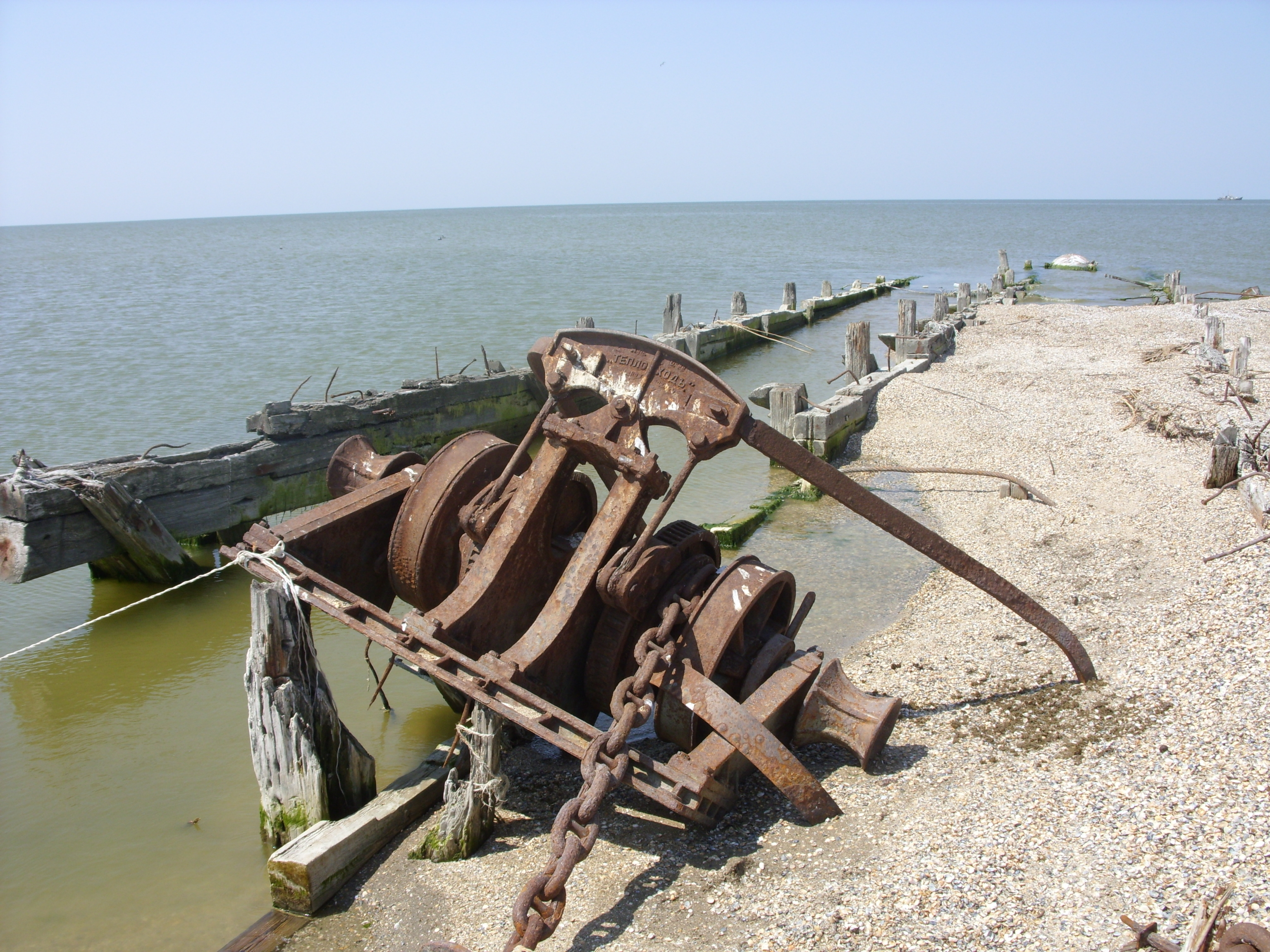
Abandoned harbour equipment

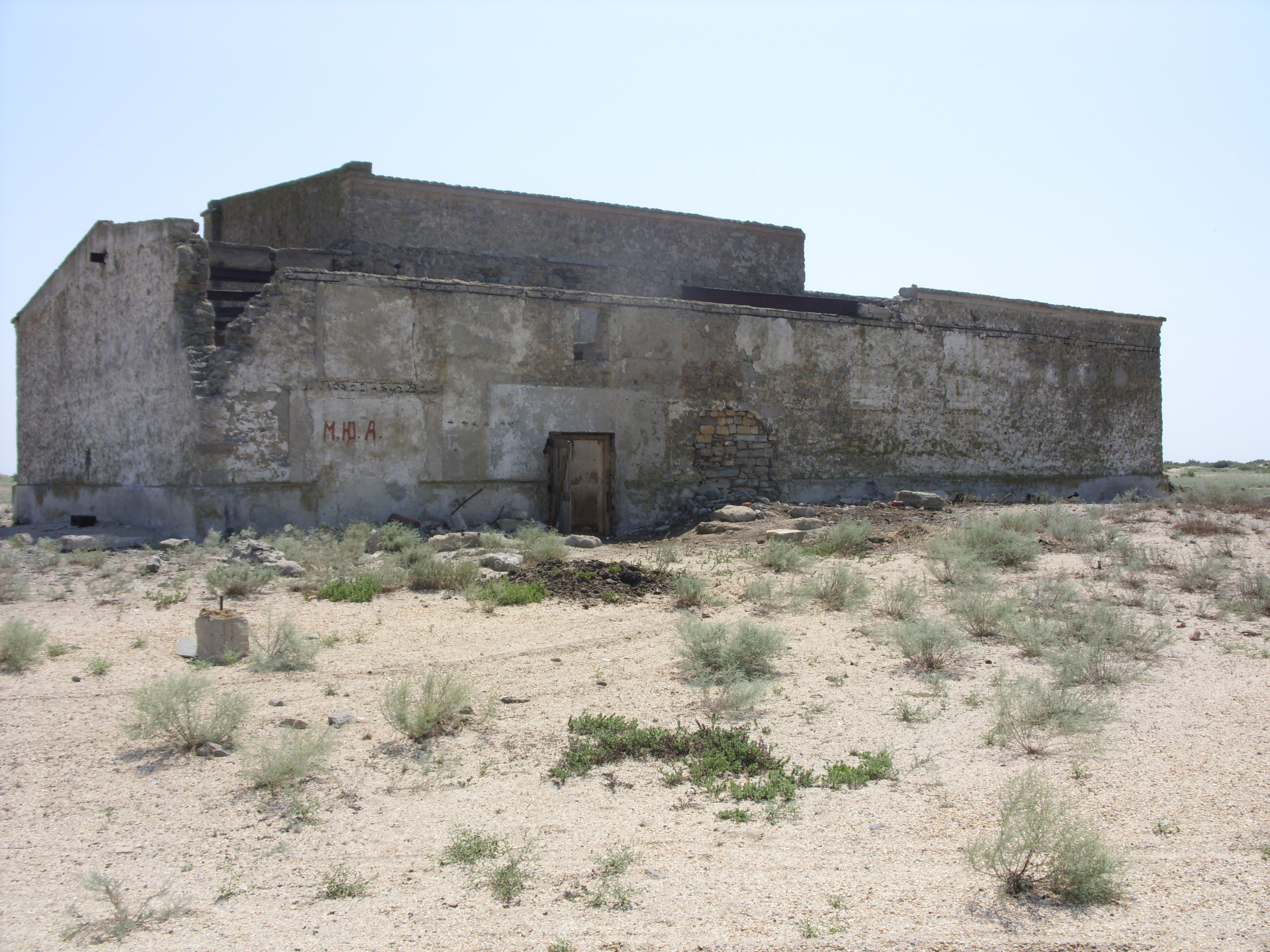
Ruins

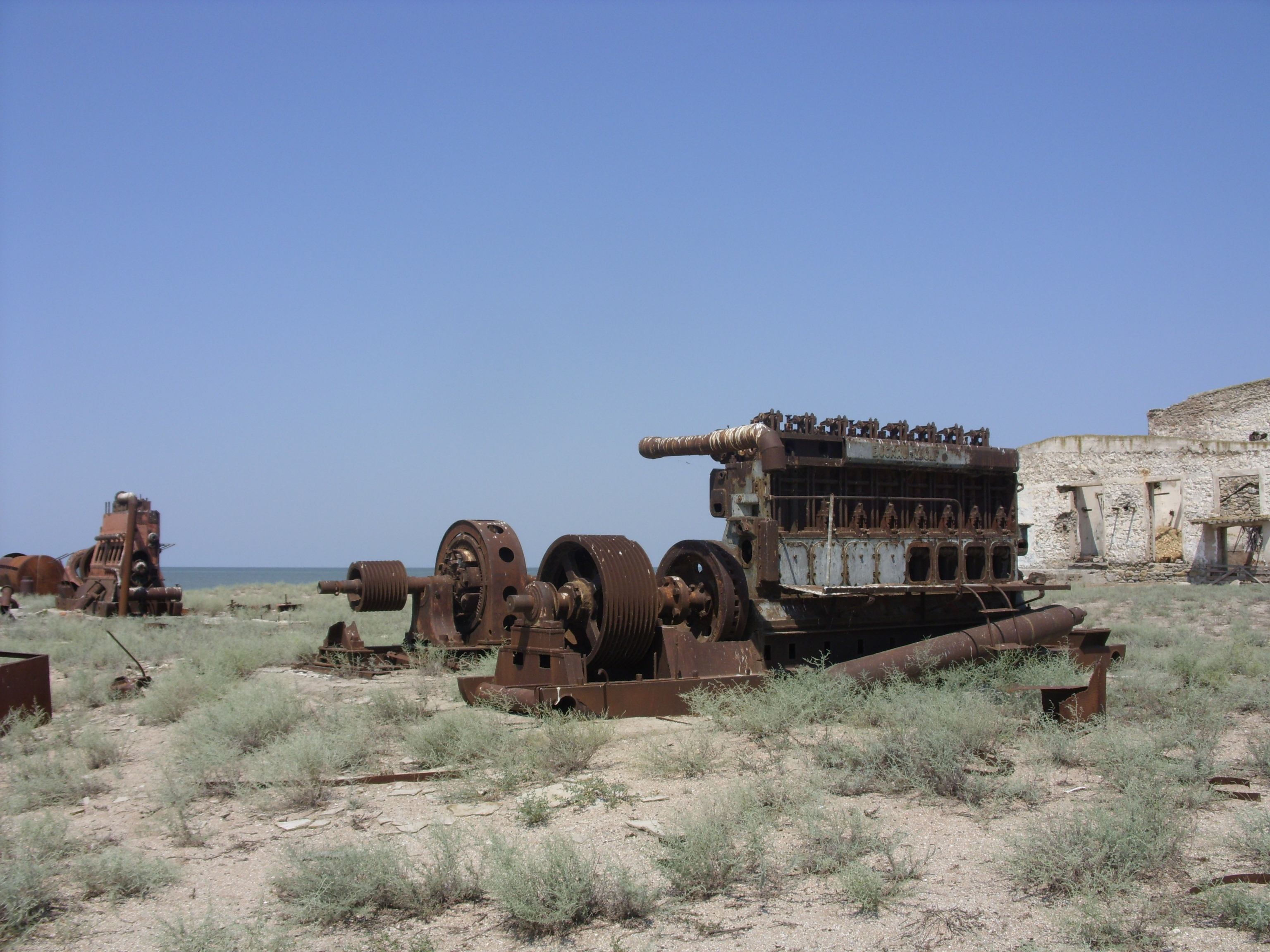
Abandoned machinery
