= Apollo Mussin-Pushkin =

Russian chemist and plant collector (1760–1805)

Apollos Apollosovich Musin-Pushkin
- Аполлос Аполлосович Мусин-Пушкин
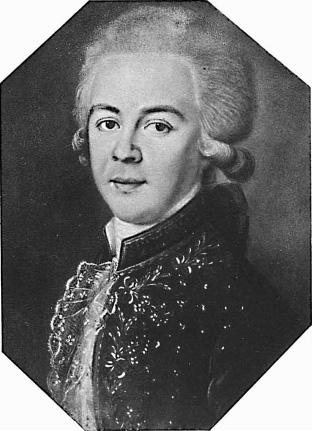
- Apollos in 1788
- Born: February 17, 1760; Saint Petersburg
- Died: April 18, 1805 (aged 45); Tbilisi
- Occupations: Chemist, plant collector

Count Apollos Apollosovich Musin-Pushkin (Russian: Аполло́с Аполло́сович Му́син-Пу́шкин; February 17, 1760 – April 18, 1805) was a Russian chemist and plant collector. He led a botanical expedition to the Caucasus in 1802 with his friend botanist Friedrich August Marschall von Bieberstein.

In 1797, he was elected a foreign member of the Royal Swedish Academy of Sciences. He was a member of the Russian mining board and developed several new methods of refining and processing of platinum. The genus of Puschkinia commemorates his name.
