= Johann Friedrich Adam =

Russian botanist (1780–1838)

Johann Friedrich Adam, later called Michael Friedrich Adams, and also Johannes Michael Friedrich Adams in full citation of botany discoveries (1780 in Moscow – 1 March 1838, in Vereya) was a botanist from St. Petersburg, Russian Empire.

He studied from 1795–1796 in the medical school of St. Petersburg. In the years 1800–1802 he traveled across Transcaucasia in the entourage of Count Apollo Mussin-Pushkin (1760–1805). In 1805, he was part of a scientific team attached to the unsuccessful diplomatic mission of Count Yury Golovkin to China. After the failure of the mission, he and many of the other scientists stayed on in Siberia to pursue their researches. In 1806, while in Yakutsk, he heard about an intact woolly mammoth carcass near the mouth of the Lena River. He hastily arranged an expedition to the location where he was able to recover most of the skeleton, skin, and almost forty pounds of hair. At the time, and for almost a century after, this was the most complete mammoth known. He returned to St. Petersburg with his prize. The skeleton is now on display at The Museum of Zoology in Saint Petersburg, where it is known as the Adams mammoth.

Later in his life, he taught as assistant professor for botanics at the Medico-Surgical Academy of Moscow.

== Publications ==
- Decades quinque novarum specierum plantarum, Tiflis, 10 November 1802
