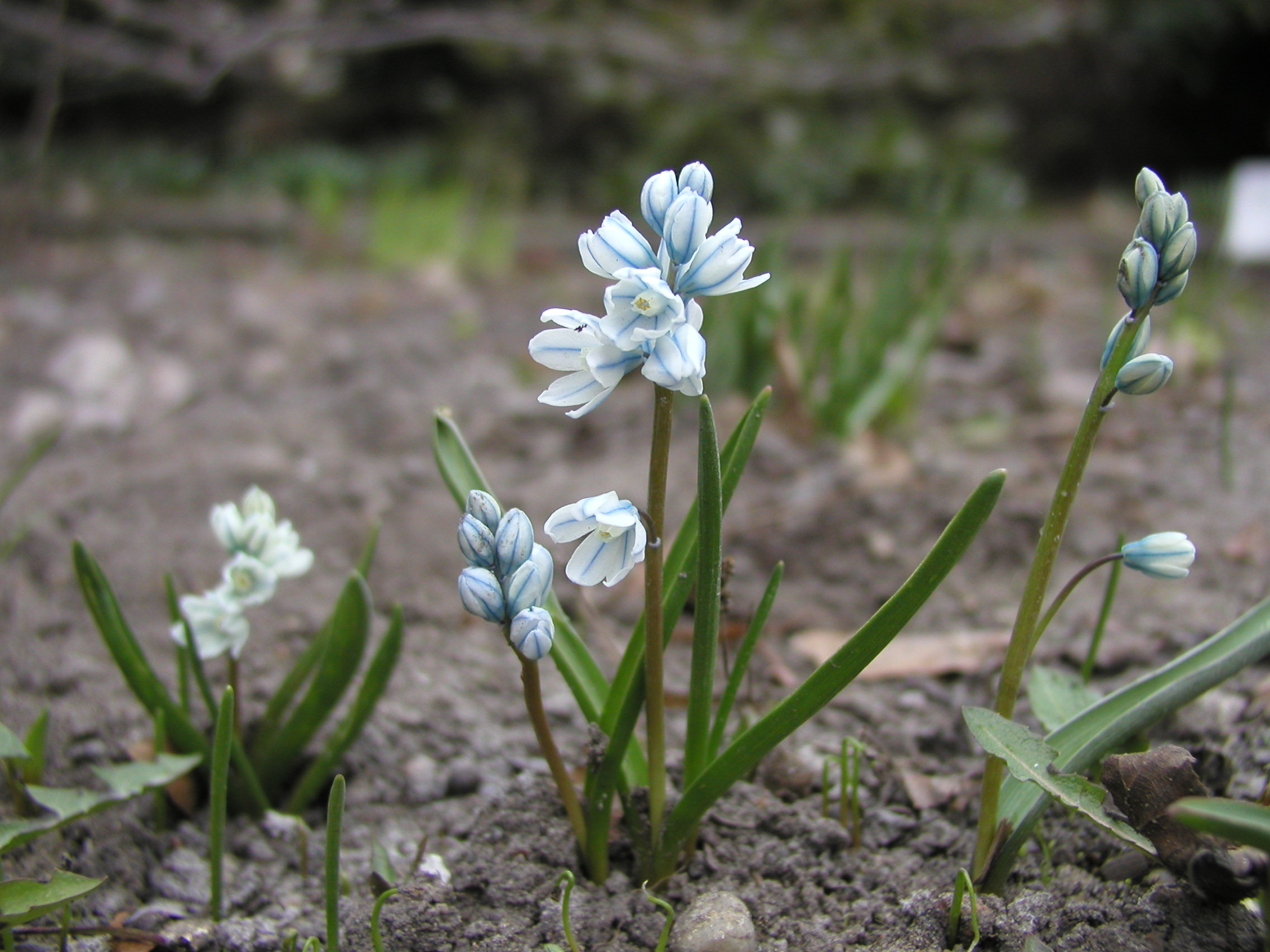

Scientific classification
- Kingdom: Plantae
- Clade: Tracheophytes
- Clade: Angiosperms
- Clade: Monocots
- Order: Asparagales
- Family: Asparagaceae
- Subfamily: Scilloideae
- Genus: Puschkinia
- Species: P. scilloides

Binomial name
- Puschkinia scilloides Adams

Synonyms
- Adamsia scilloides (Adams) Willd.; Puschkinia hyacinthoides Baker; Puschkinia libanotica Zucc.; Puschkinia sicula Van Houtte

= Puschkinia scilloides =

Species of flowering plant

Puschkinia scilloides, commonly known as striped squill or Lebanon squill, is a bulbous perennial, native to Western Asia and the Caucasus.

== Description ==
Puschkinia scilloides is a small bulbous plant, growing to about 10–15 cm (4–6 in) tall. It has two narrow basal leaves that widen towards the tips (oblanceolate). The inflorescence appears in early spring and is a dense raceme with up to 20 flowers. The flowers are pale blue with a darker blue line in the centre of each tepal. A characteristic of the genus Puschkinia is a small cup surrounding the stamens and style.

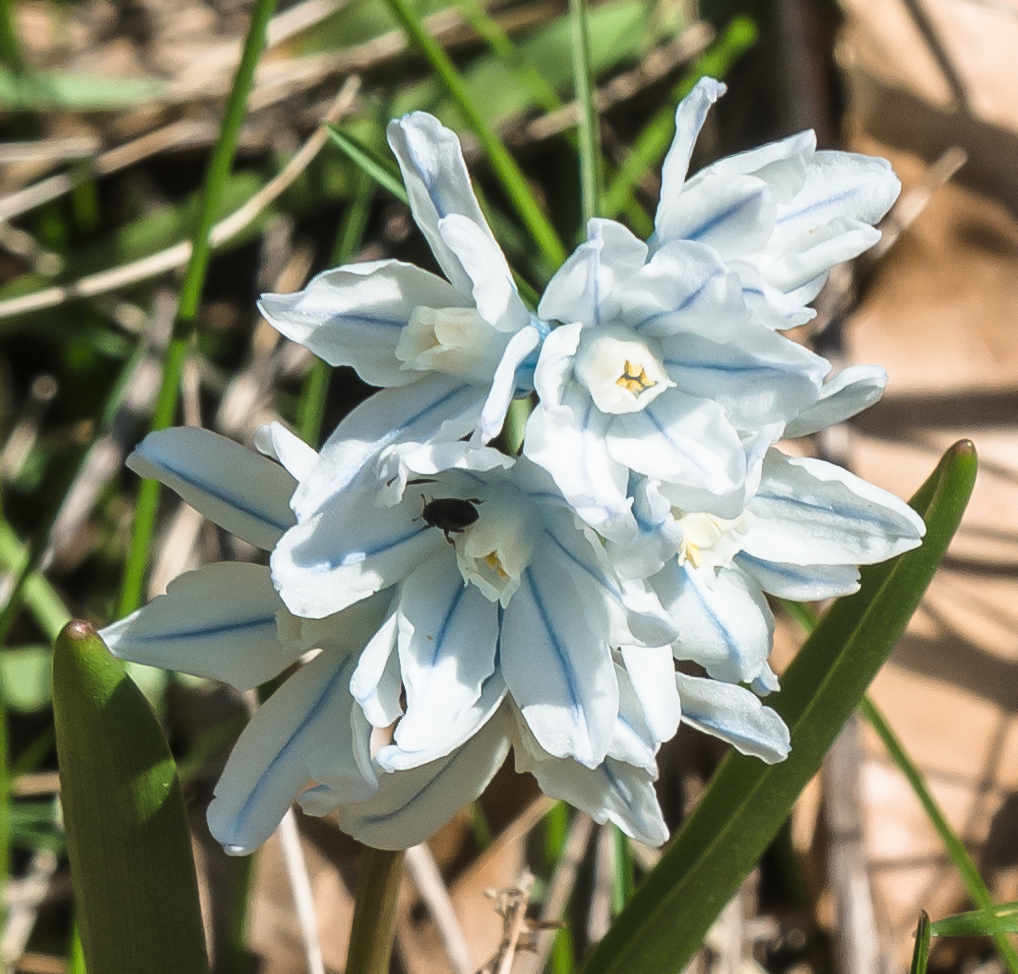
Close-up of flower

== Distribution and habitat ==
Puschkinia scilloides is native to Western Asia (Turkey, Lebanon, Syria, Iraq, and Iran) and the Caucasus (North Caucasus and the Transcaucasus). It grows in alpine meadows near the snowline.

== Cultivation ==
Puschkinia scilloides is cultivated as an ornamental bulbous plant, where it may be grown in a rock garden. A cool position in well drained soil is recommended.
