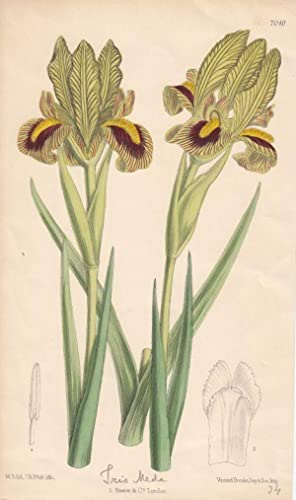
- Iris meda, botanical illustration drawn by Matilda Smith and lithographed by J.N. Fitch

Scientific classification
- Kingdom: Plantae
- Clade: Tracheophytes
- Clade: Angiosperms
- Clade: Monocots
- Order: Asparagales
- Family: Iridaceae
- Genus: Iris
- Species: I. meda

Binomial name
- Iris meda Stapf.

Synonyms
- Iris fibrosa Freyn

= Iris meda =

Species of plant

Iris meda is a species in the genus Iris, it is also in the subgenus of Iris and in the Oncocyclus section. It is from the desert mountains and hills of Media (which is now Iran) and has long grey-green leaves with cream, pale yellow or yellow flowers, which have purple or dark brown patches and yellow beards.

== Description ==
Iris meda has small, about 1 cm (0 in) long, thin, stoloniferous-like rhizomes, and long secondary roots underneath the rhizome.

It has upright, narrow, blade-shaped foliage, which are grey-green and 10–15 cm (4–6 in) long, and 0.15–0.4 cm (0–0 in) wide.

The plant in total can reach between 10–25 cm (4–10 in) tall, with straight stems reaching 20 cm (8 in) high.

It blooms between April and May, and has small flowers, that have a range of colour variations, that come in shades from cream or whitish ground color, lemon yellow to creamy straw-yellow ground colours. It is similar in form to Iris sari, which does not grow in Iran and does not have folded falls.

Like other irises, it has 2 pairs of petals, 3 large sepals (outer petals), known as the 'falls' and 3 inner, smaller petals (or tepals), known as the 'standards'. The standards are oblanceolate, 6–7 cm (2–3 in) long and 3.5 cm (1 in) wide.

The falls are 6 cm (2 in) long, thin and either undulating, or curled over. They have a large chestnut-maroon-black, or dark brown or purplish signal patch in the centre of the petal. Also they have a dense, narrow 'beard' of long yellow hairs. They also have greenish yellow style arms which are veined near apex.

After it has flowered it produces a seed capsule and seeds that have not been described.

=== Biochemistry ===
As most irises are diploid, having two sets of chromosomes. This can be used to identify hybrids and classification of groupings. It has a chromosome count of 2n=20.

== Taxonomy ==
The Latin specific epithet meda refers to Media (a region of Persia). Similar to Apis mellifera meda (the Persian honey bee or Iranian honey bee).

It was first found in Persia, and then described and published by Austrian born botanist Otto Stapf in Denkschr. Acad. Wein (Denkschriften der Akademie der Wissenschaften = Memoranda of the Academy of Sciences) vol.50 on page 20, (collected on the Bot. Ergeb. Polak. Exped. Pers.) in 1885.

It is listed in the Encyclopedia of Life as Iris meda, and it is a RHS accepted name of iris. It was verified by United States Department of Agriculture and the Agricultural Research Service on 15 November 2002, then updated on 4 April 2003.

== Distribution and habitat ==
It is native to temperate Asia.

=== Range ===
It is found in Iran. Within the region of Mianeh, East Azerbaijan.

=== Habitat ===
It grows on either stony clay, or sandy or gravelly soils, of dry hills, desert mountains, and Kurdish steppes. At altitudes of between 1,400–2,400 m (4,600–7,900 ft) above sea level.

== Cultivation ==
In the UK, it does not survive in cultivation as it needs dry conditions and very dry summers.

== Hybrids ==
Iris meda has the following two crosses; 'Amboy Agate' (Iris samariae X I. meda) and 'Moleskin'.

== Culture ==
In 1991, the government of Iran issued a set of postage stamps with the flora of Iran on them, which included "Iris meda".

== Toxicity ==
Like many other irises, most parts of the plant are poisonous (including rhizome and leaves), and if mistakenly ingested can cause stomach pains and vomiting. Handling the plant may cause skin irritation or an allergic reaction.
