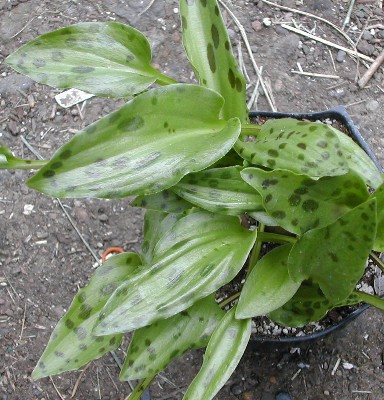
- Drimiopsis maculata

Scientific classification
- Kingdom: Plantae
- Clade: Tracheophytes
- Clade: Angiosperms
- Clade: Monocots
- Order: Asparagales
- Family: Asparagaceae
- Subfamily: Scilloideae
- Tribe: Hyacintheae; Dumort., Fl. Belg. 141. (1827)

Type genus
- Hyacinthus L.

Subtribes
- Hyacinthinae; Massoniinae; Pseudoprospero

Synonyms
- Hyacinthaceae Batsch ex Borkh., Bot. Wörterb. 1: 315. (1797); Massonieae Baker, J. Linn. Soc. London, Bot. 11: 355. (1870)

= Hyacintheae =

Tribe of flowering plants

Hyacintheae is a flowering plant tribe in the subfamily Scilloideae. It contains the following genera:

- Autonoe (Webb & Berthel.) Speta
- Barnardia Lindl.
- Bellevalia Lapeyr.
- Brimeura Salisb.
- Fessia Speta
- Hyacinthella Schur
- Hyacinthoides Heist. ex Fabr.
- Hyacinthus Tourn. ex L.
- Muscari Mill. (synonyms Leopoldia and Pseudomuscari)
- Prospero Salisb.
- Pseudoprospero Speta
- Puschkinia Adams
- Scilla L.
- Zagrosia Speta
