= Dipcadi brevifolium =

Scientific classification
- Kingdom: Plantae
- Clade: Tracheophytes
- Clade: Angiosperms
- Clade: Monocots
- Order: Asparagales
- Family: Asparagaceae
- Subfamily: Scilloideae
- Genus: Dipcadi
- Species: D. brevifolium

Binomial name
- Dipcadi brevifolium (Thunb.) Fourc.

Species of flowering plant

Dipcadi brevifolium is a species of flowering plant in the family Asparagaceae, native to Namibia, the Cape Provinces of South Africa, the Mozambique Channel Islands and Madagascar.

The species was first described, as Hyacinthus brevifolius, by Carl Peter Thunberg in 1794. It was transferred to Dipcadi by Henry Georges Fourcade in 1932.
