= Bluebell family =

Bluebell family is a common name for a family of plants and may refer to:

- The family containing the common bluebell (Hyacinthoides non-scripta), which has been variously classified in Liliaceae, Hyacinthaceae and Asparagaceae
- Campanulaceae
