= Alrawia =

Scientific classification
- Kingdom: Plantae
- Clade: Tracheophytes
- Clade: Angiosperms
- Clade: Monocots
- Order: Asparagales
- Family: Asparagaceae
- Subfamily: Scilloideae
- Genus: Alrawia (Wendelbo) Perss. & Wendelbo

Genus of flowering plants

Alrawia is a genus of bulbous flowering plants in the family Asparagaceae, subfamily Scilloideae (also treated as the family Hyacinthaceae). It is native to north-eastern Iraq and Iran.

== Description ==
Species of Alrawia grow from bulbs covered with a tunic that is grayish outside and often violet inside. They produce a single flowering stem (scape); the inflorescence consists of a raceme. Individual flowers are borne on a short stalk (pedicel) which is turned downwards when the flowers first appear. The tepals are violet with whitish lobe tips and are joined at the base for up to half their length. The pedicels lengthen and turn upwards after flowers are fertilized; the black seeds are globular or ovate.

== Species ==
As of March 2013, the World Checklist of Selected Plant Families recognized two species:

- Alrawia bellii (Baker) Perss. & Wendelbo

Flowers up to 1 cm (0.4 in) long; tube one quarter the length of the whole flower; western Iran.

- Alrawia nutans (Wendelbo) Perss. & Wendelbo

Flowers slightly longer, up to 1.3 cm (0.5 in) long; tube one half the length of the whole flower; north-east Iraq.

== Cultivation ==
Brian Mathew describes the species as "enthusiasts' plants", being "not very showy". They are said to be easy to cultivate in a bulb frame or alpine house but not to increase readily. As they occur naturally in regions with hot dry summers, the bulbs need to be dried out when dormant.
