= Austronea =

Scientific classification
- Kingdom: Plantae
- Clade: Tracheophytes
- Clade: Angiosperms
- Clade: Monocots
- Order: Asparagales
- Family: Asparagaceae
- Subfamily: Scilloideae
- Tribe: Urgineeae
- Genus: Austronea; Mart.-Azorín, M.B.Crespo, M.Pinter & Wetschnig

Species
- See text

Genus of plants in the asparagus family

Austronea is a genus of flowering plants in the family Asparagaceae, found in Namibia and South Africa. It is sister to Fusifilum.

== Species ==
Currently accepted species include:

- Austronea acarophylla (E.Brink & A.P.Dold) Mart.-Azorín, M.B.Crespo & A.P.Dold
- Austronea barkerae (Oberm. ex J.C.Manning & Goldblatt) Mart.-Azorín, M.B.Crespo, M.Pinter & Wetschnig
- Austronea chalumnensis (A.P.Dold & E.Brink) Mart.-Azorín, M.B.Crespo & A.P.Dold
- Austronea ciliolata (J.C.Manning & J.M.J.Deacon) Mart.-Azorín, M.B.Crespo, M.Pinter & Wetschnig
- Austronea densiflora Mart.-Azorín, M.B.Crespo & A.P.Dold
- Austronea fimbrimarginata (Snijman) Mart.-Azorín, M.B.Crespo, M.Pinter & Wetschnig
- Austronea grandiflora Mart.-Azorín, M.B.Crespo, M.Pinter & Wetschnig
- Austronea hispidoplicata Mart.-Azorín, M.B.Crespo, M.Pinter & M.Á.Alonso
- Austronea linearis Mart.-Azorín, M.B.Crespo & A.P.Dold
- Austronea marginata (Thunb.) Mart.-Azorín, M.B.Crespo, M.Pinter & Wetschnig
- Austronea olifanta Mart.-Azorín, M.B.Crespo, M.Pinter & M.Á.Alonso
- Austronea papillosa Mart.-Azorín, M.B.Crespo, M.Pinter & M.Á.Alonso
- Austronea patersoniae Mart.-Azorín, A.P.Dold & M.B.Crespo
- Austronea pinguis Mart.-Azorín, M.B.Crespo, M.Pinter & M.Á.Alonso
- Austronea pulchromarginata (J.C.Manning & Goldblatt) Mart.-Azorín, M.B.Crespo, M.Pinter & Wetschnig
- Austronea trichophylla (Mart.-Azorín, A.P.Dold & M.B.Crespo) Mart.-Azorín, M.B.Crespo & A.P.Dold
- Austronea vermiformis (J.C.Manning & Goldblatt) Mart.-Azorín, M.B.Crespo, M.Pinter & Wetschnig
- Austronea virens (Schltr.) Mart.-Azorín, M.B.Crespo, M.Pinter & Wetschnig
