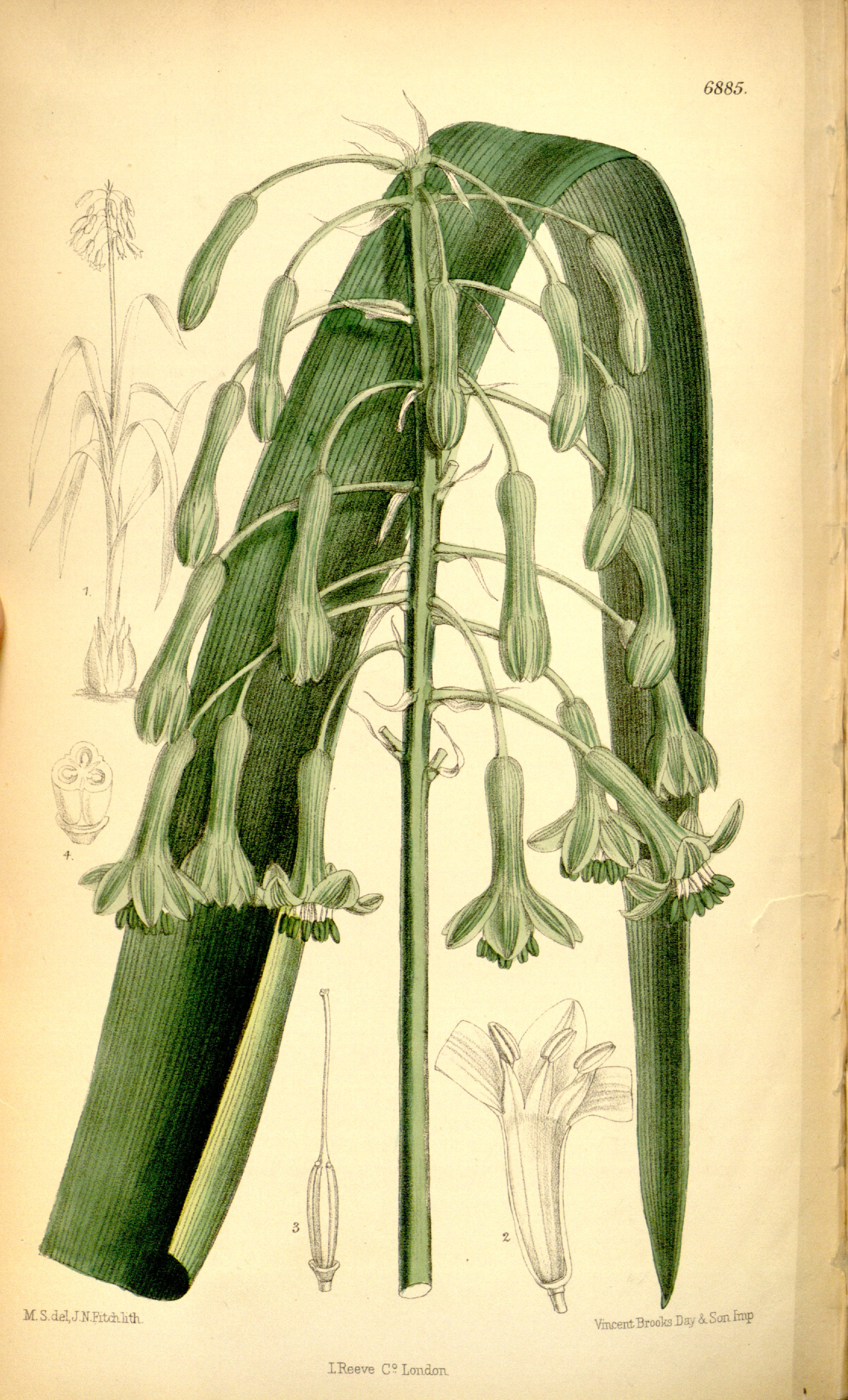
- Pseudogaltonia clavata (syn. Galtonia clavata) from an 1886 illustration

Scientific classification
- Kingdom: Plantae
- Clade: Embryophytes
- Clade: Tracheophytes
- Clade: Spermatophytes
- Clade: Angiosperms
- Clade: Monocots
- Order: Asparagales
- Family: Asparagaceae
- Subfamily: Scilloideae
- Genus: Pseudogaltonia (Kuntze) Engl.

Synonyms
- Lindneria T.Durand & Lubbers

= Pseudogaltonia =

Genus of flowering plants

Pseudogaltonia is a genus of bulbous flowering plants in the family Asparagaceae, subfamily Scilloideae (also treated as the family Hyacinthaceae). It is distributed in southern Africa (the Cape Province of South Africa, Namibia, Botswana).

== Description ==
Pseudogaltonia grows from a large bulb with a fibrous tunic. The flowers are borne on a long stem (scape) in a pyramid-shaped raceme. Individual flowers are borne on long stalks (pedicels) and droop downwards. The tepals are fused at the base, forming a tube about two-thirds or three-quarters of the length of the flower, swollen slightly at its base. The tubular part of the tepals is green, the free lobes are whitish with a green streak. The stamens, which protrude from the flower, have broad triangle-shaped filaments which arise from the mouth of the flower tube and green anthers. The seeds are black.

== Systematics ==
The name Pseudogaltonia was first used by Otto Kuntze in 1886 as the name of a section within the genus Hyacinthus. He also suggested that those who preferred smaller genera could use it as the name of a separate genus. (Note: Article 36.1 of the International Code of Nomenclature for algae, fungi, and plants states that "A name is not validly published (a) when it is not accepted by the author in the original publication; (b) when it is merely proposed in anticipation of the future acceptance of the taxon concerned". Kuntze did not himself accept Pseudogaltonia as a genus name, only saying that whoever (German: wer) preferred smaller genera might do so.) In 1888, Adolf Engler used Kuntze's Pseudogaltonia as a genus name in his treatment of the Liliaceae. Kuntze had named the only species known at that time as Hyacinthus pechuelii, which Engler transferred to Pseudogaltonia pechuelii. However, the species had already been described with the name Galtonia clavata in 1884, giving the epithet "clavata" priority over "pechuelii." A second species of Pseudogaltonia, P. liliiflora, was named in 2009.

The genus is placed in the tribe Ornithogaleae (or the subfamily Ornithogaloideae by those who use the family Hyacinthaceae). Within this tribe, molecular phylogenetic studies place it as most closely related to the genus Dipcadi.

=== Species ===
As of April 2013, the World Checklist of Selected Plant Families recognized the following two species:

- Pseudogaltonia clavata (Baker ex Mast.) E.Phillips – synonyms include Galtonia clavata Baker ex Mast., Ornithogalum clavatum (Baker ex Mast.) J.C.Manning & Goldblatt; Hyacinthus pechuelii Kuntze, Pseudogaltonia pechuelii (Kuntze) Engl.
- Pseudogaltonia liliiflora J.C.Manning & Goldblatt

== Bibliography ==
* Baker, JG (1886). "Galtonia clavata". Curtis's Botanical Magazine. 112: t. 6885.
