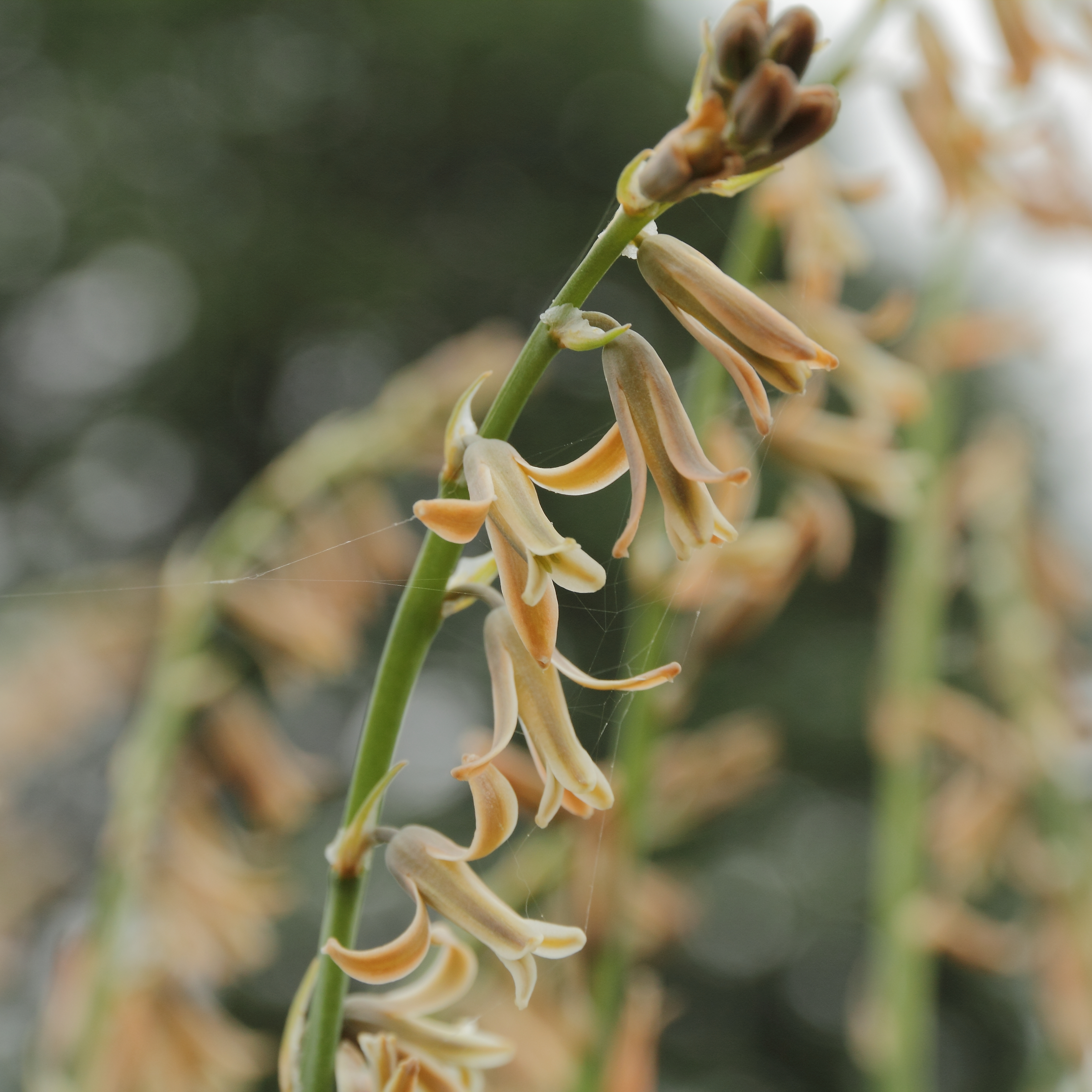
- Flowers of Dipcadi serotinum

Scientific classification
- Kingdom: Plantae
- Clade: Tracheophytes
- Clade: Angiosperms
- Clade: Monocots
- Order: Asparagales
- Family: Asparagaceae
- Subfamily: Scilloideae
- Genus: Dipcadi; Medik.

Synonyms
- Zuccangnia Thunb.; Uropetalon Burch. ex Ker Gawl.; Polemannia P.J.Bergius ex Schltdl.; Baeoterpe Salisb.; Tricharis Salisb.

= Dipcadi =

Genus of flowering plants

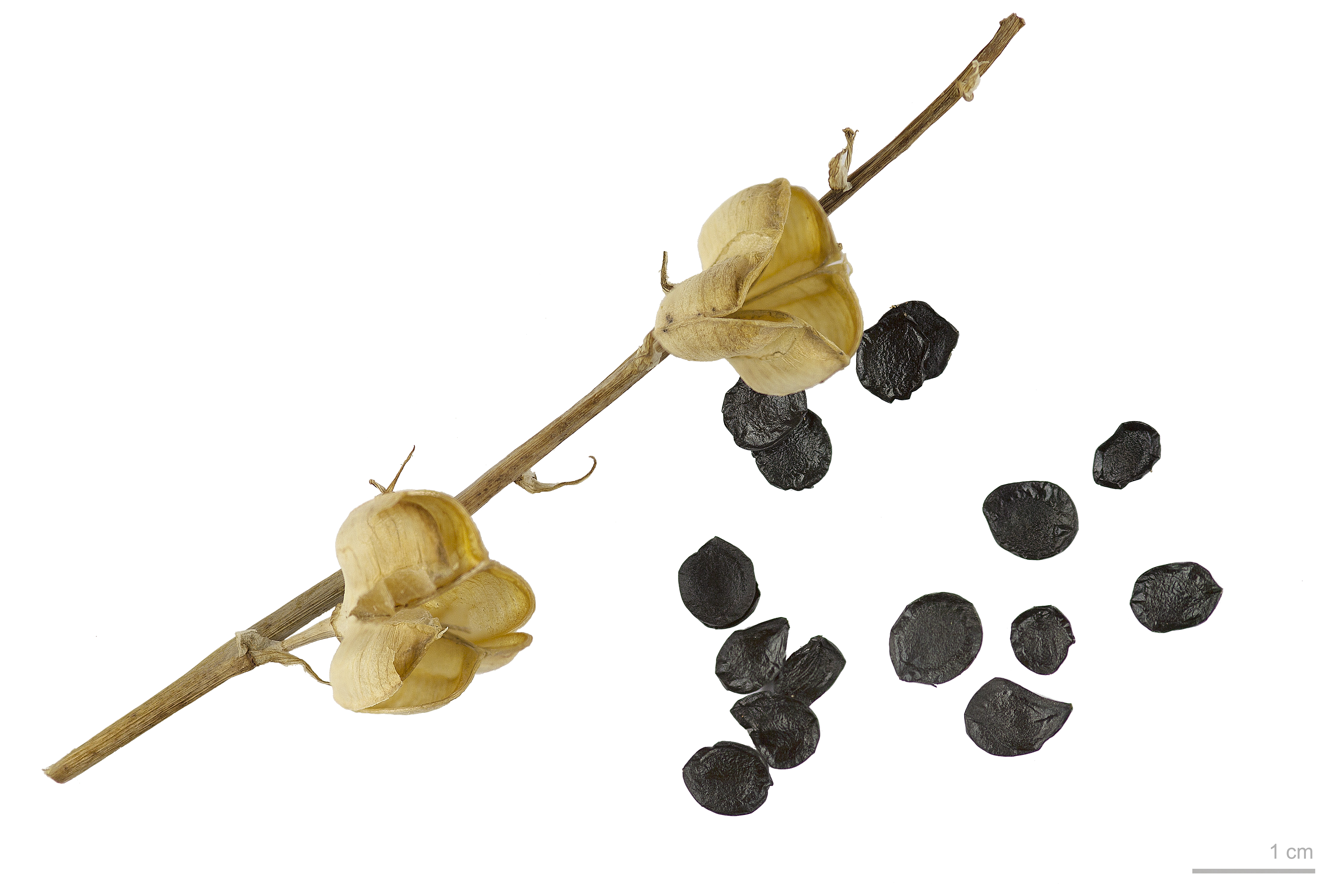
Dipcadi serotinum - MHNT

Dipcadi is a genus of bulbous flowering plants in the family Asparagaceae, subfamily Scilloideae (also treated as the family Hyacinthaceae). It is widely distributed, occurring in southern Europe, most of Africa and the Middle East through to the Indian subcontinent.

== Description ==
Species of Dipcadi grow from small bulbs. The solitary flower stem (scape) bears a loose raceme of green or brown flowers, sometimes with different colours at the tips of the three inner tepals. The raceme is usually one-sided (secund). The tepals are joined at the base for up to two thirds of their length to form a tube. The apices of the tepals then curve outwards, particularly the outer three. The outer three tepals may have a rounded "spur" at their tips. The stamens, which are enclosed within the flower, are joined to the tube formed by the tepals and have flat filaments. The black seeds are in the shape of a disc or a flattened globe.

Dipcadi serotinum, from south-west Europe and north Africa, although sombre in colour, is sometimes cultivated by gardeners specializing in ornamental bulbous plants.

== Systematics ==
The genus was named by Friedrich Kasimir Medikus in 1790, based on the species Linnaeus had called Hyacinthus serotinus. Medikus distinguished Dipcadi from Hyacinthus because of the former's many flattened seeds and tubular flowers. Along with three other genera, Albuca, Ornithogalum sensu lato and Pseudogaltonia, Dipcadi is placed in the tribe Ornithogaleae (or subfamily Ornithogaloideae by those who recognize the Scilloideae as the separate family Hyacinthaceae).

=== Species ===
As of March 2013, the World Checklist of Selected Plant Families recognized 41 species and one hybrid:

- Dipcadi bakerianum Bolus
- Dipcadi balfourii Baker
- Dipcadi biflorum Ghaz.
- Dipcadi brevifolium (Thunb.) Fourc.
- Dipcadi ciliare (Eckl. & Zeyh. ex Harv.) Baker
- Dipcadi × clarkeanum Schinz (D. bakerianum × D. glaucum)
- Dipcadi concanense (Dalzell) Baker
- Dipcadi cowanii (Ridl.) H.Perrier
- Dipcadi crispum Baker
- Dipcadi dekindtianum Engl.
- Dipcadi erythraeum Webb & Berthel.
- Dipcadi fesoghlense (Solms) Baker
- Dipcadi garuense Engl. & K.Krause
- Dipcadi glaucum (Burch. ex Ker Gawl.) Baker
- Dipcadi goaense Prabhug.
- Dipcadi gracillimum Baker
- Dipcadi guichardii A.R.Sm.
- Dipcadi heterocuspe Baker
- Dipcadi kuriensis A.G.Mill.
- Dipcadi ledermannii Engl. & K.Krause
- Dipcadi longifolium (Lindl.) Baker
- Dipcadi maharashtrense Deb & S.Dasgupta
- Dipcadi marlothii Engl.
- Dipcadi mechowii Engl.
- Dipcadi minor Hook.f.
- Dipcadi montanum (Dalzell) Baker
- Dipcadi ndelleense A.Chev.
- Dipcadi oxylobum Welw. ex Baker
- Dipcadi panousei Sauvage & Veilex
- Dipcadi papillatum Oberm.
- Dipcadi platyphyllum Baker
- Dipcadi reidii Deb & S.Dasgupta
- Dipcadi rigidifolium Baker
- Dipcadi saxorum Blatt.
- Dipcadi serotinum (L.) Medik.
- Dipcadi susianum (Nábelek) Wendelbo
- Dipcadi thollonianum Hua
- Dipcadi turkestanicum Vved.
- Dipcadi ursulae Blatt.
- Dipcadi vaginatum Baker
- Dipcadi viride (L.) Moench
- Dipcadi welwitschii (Baker) Baker
