= Autonoe (disambiguation) =

Autonoe may refer to:

- Autonoë, the name of several people in Greek mythology
  - Autonoë (daughter of Cadmus), a Theban princess
- Autonoe (plant), a genus of flowering plants
- Autonoe (moon), a moon of Jupiter
