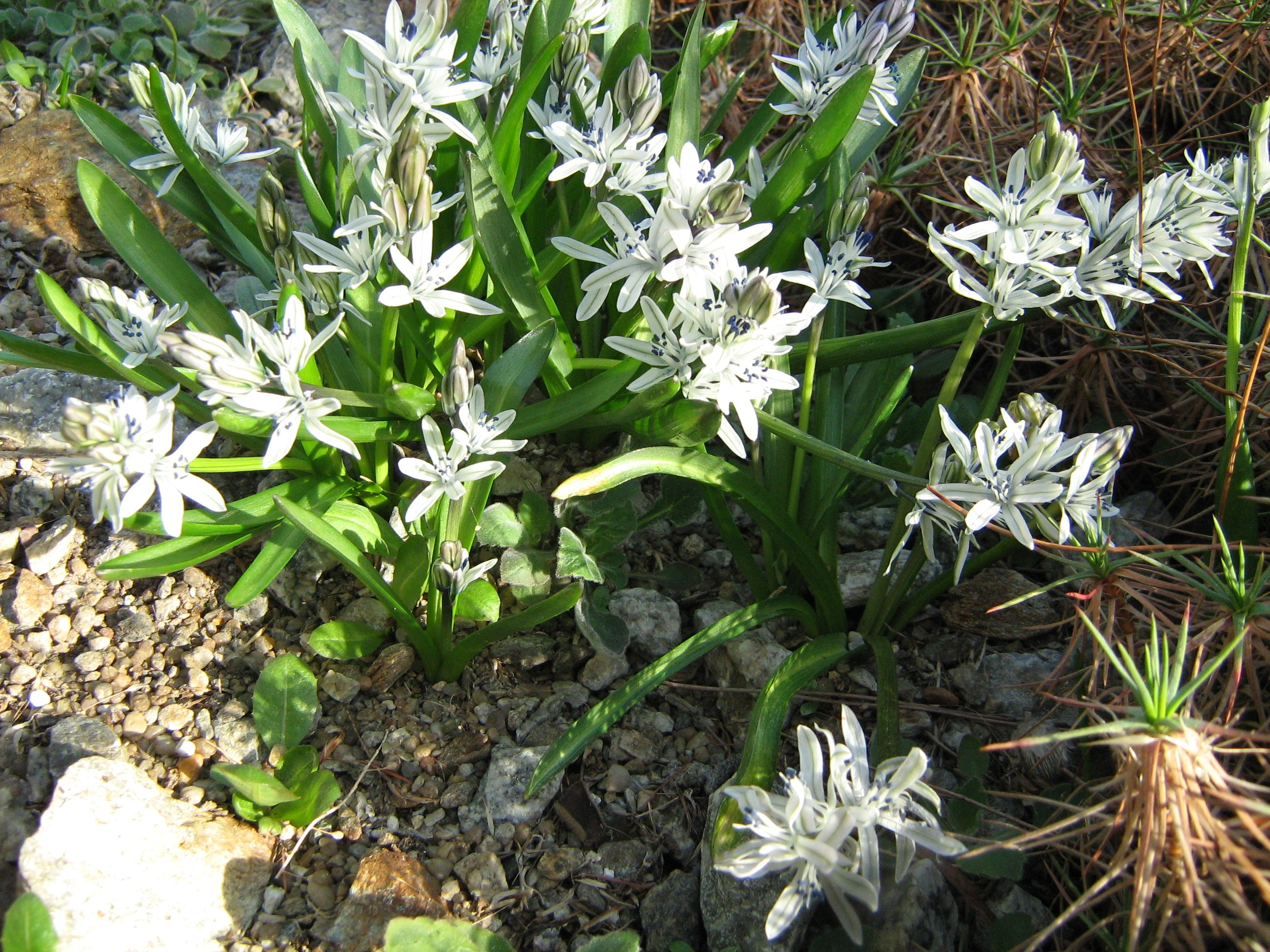
- Fessia puschkinioides in cultivation at the Berne Botanical Gardens

Scientific classification
- Kingdom: Plantae
- Clade: Tracheophytes
- Clade: Angiosperms
- Clade: Monocots
- Order: Asparagales
- Family: Asparagaceae
- Subfamily: Scilloideae
- Genus: Fessia; Speta

= Fessia =

Genus of flowering plants

Fessia is a genus of bulbous flowering plants in the family Asparagaceae, subfamily Scilloideae (also treated as the family Hyacinthaceae). It is distributed from Iran to Central Asia and Pakistan.

== Description ==
Species of Fessia grow from bulbs, which are covered by a gray or black tunic, purple inside. Each bulb produces one or more flower stems (scapes) bearing whitish to blue or violet flowers. The stamens have pale blue anthers. The black seeds are globe or drop shaped.

A number of species of Fessia, often under their earlier names in the genus Scilla, are grown by gardeners specializing in ornamental bulbous plants; they are hardy but some need a dry period in summer. F. puschkinioides (syn. Scilla puchkinioides) is described as "an easy to grow hardy species".

== Systematics ==
The genus Fessia was created by Franz Speta in 1998. All the species were previously included in a more broadly defined genus Scilla. The genus is placed in the tribe Hyacintheae (or the subfamily Hyacinthoideae by those who use the family Hyacinthaceae).

=== Species ===
As of March 2013, the World Checklist of Selected Plant Families recognized 11 species:

- Fessia bisotunensis (Speta) Speta
- Fessia furseorum (Meikle) Speta
- Fessia gorganica (Speta) Speta
- Fessia greilhuberi (Speta) Speta
- Fessia hohenackeri (Fisch. & C.A.Mey.) Speta
- Fessia khorassanica (Meikle) Speta
- Fessia parwanica (Speta) Speta
- Fessia purpurea (Griff.) Speta
- Fessia puschkinioides (Regel) Speta
- Fessia raewskiana (Regel) Speta
- Fessia vvedenskyi (Pazij) Speta
