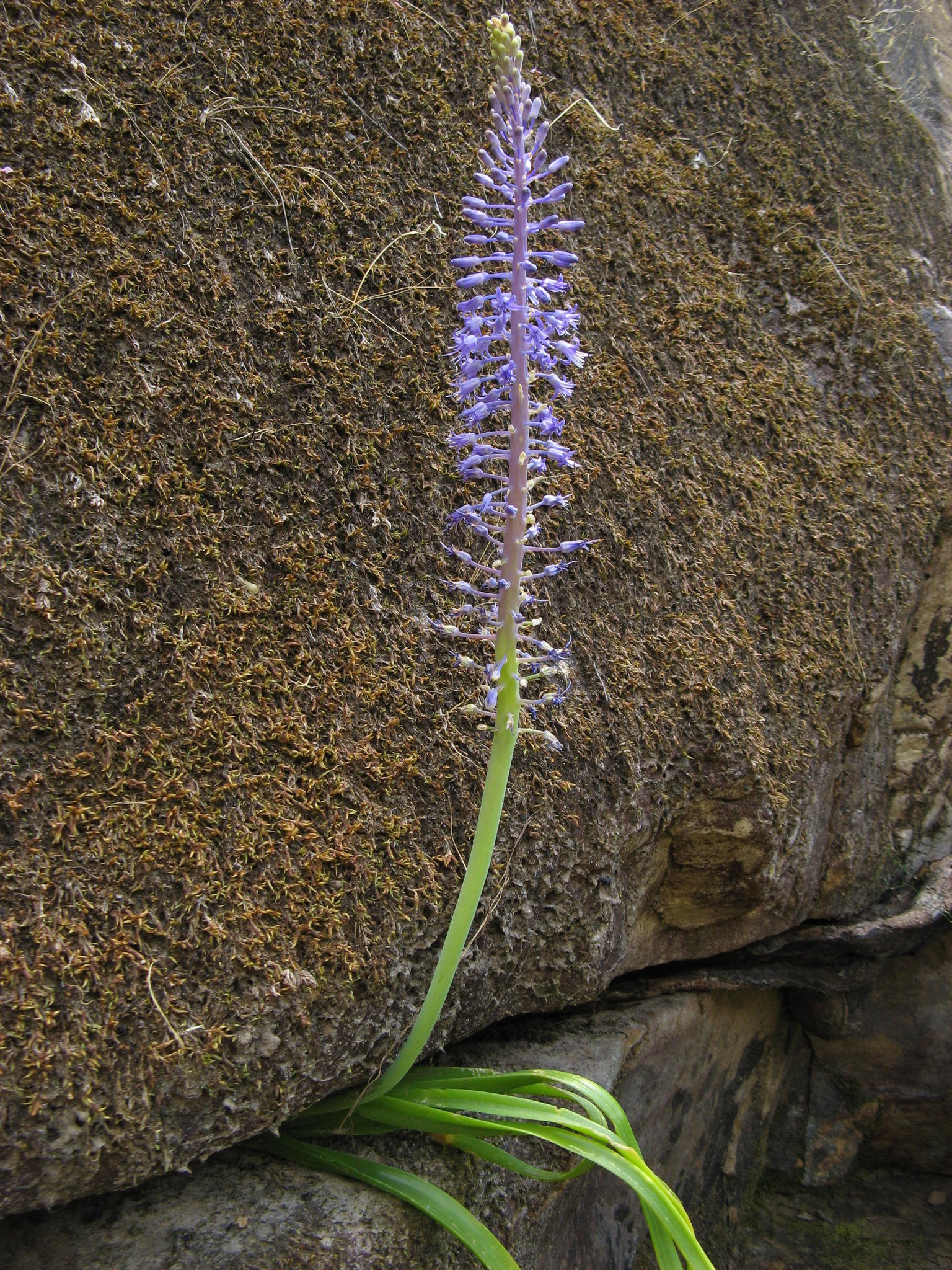

Scientific classification
- Kingdom: Plantae
- Clade: Tracheophytes
- Clade: Angiosperms
- Clade: Monocots
- Order: Asparagales
- Family: Asparagaceae
- Subfamily: Scilloideae
- Genus: Spetaea; Wetschnig & Pfosser
- Species: S. lachenaliiflora

Binomial name
- Spetaea lachenaliiflora Wetschnig & Pfosser

= Spetaea =

Genus of flowering plants

Spetaea is a monotypic genus of bulbous flowering plants in the family Asparagaceae, subfamily Scilloideae (also treated as the family Hyacinthaceae). The only known species Spetaea lachenaliiflora is found only in the south-west of the Cape Province in South Africa. Prior to 2003, it was incorrectly known as Scilla plumbea.

== Description ==
Spetaea lachenaliiflora grows from underground bulbs which have a leathery dark brown outer tunic. The linear leaves are produced at the same time as the flowers; they are smooth, green and fleshy. The flowers are borne on an upright stem (peduncle) in a many-flowered raceme which forms a narrow cylindrical shape. Individual flowers have six bright blue tepals which are joined at the base for about two thirds of their length producing a narrow bell shape. The tepals persist into the fruiting stage. The stamens have filaments joined to each other at the base and to the base of the tepals. The ovoid seeds are black. They have a prominent whitish hilum which distinguishes the species from related genera.

Spetaea lachenaliiflora is found only in the west of Cape Province, South Africa, where it is found in moist areas and along streams in the Bains Kloof and Du Toits Kloof Mountains.

== Systematics ==
The genus and species were named by Wolfgang Wetschnig and Martin Pfosser in 2003. Previously, the species was mistakenly called Scilla plumbea, correctly the name for a different plant now called Merwilla plumbea. The generic name honours Franz Speta, an Austrian botanist specializing in the Scilloideae who first drew Wetchnig and Pfosser's attention to the difference between this species and the true Scilla plumbea. The specific epithet indicates the similarity in the overall appearance of the flowers to those of the genus Lachenalia.

Spetaea is placed in the tribe Hyacintheae (or subfamily Hyacinthoideae by those who accept the family Hyacinthaceae). Molecular phylogenetic studies have shown that it is close to the genus Daubenya.
