= Autonoe (plant) =

Scientific classification
- Kingdom: Plantae
- Clade: Tracheophytes
- Clade: Angiosperms
- Clade: Monocots
- Order: Asparagales
- Family: Asparagaceae
- Subfamily: Scilloideae
- Tribe: Hyacintheae
- Genus: Autonoe (Webb & Berthel.) Speta

Genus of flowering plants

Autonoe is a genus of flowering plants in the family Asparagaceae. It includes four species native to Morocco, Western Sahara, and Macaronesia (the Canary Islands, Madeira, and Selvagens).

- Autonoe berthelotii (Webb & Berthel.) Speta – Canary Islands (Lanzarote and Fuerteventura)
- Autonoe haemorrhoidalis (Webb & Berthel.) Speta – Canary Islands
- Autonoe latifolia (Willd.) Speta – Canary Islands, Morocco, and Western Sahara
- Autonoe madeirensis (Menezes) Speta – Madeira and the Selvagens
