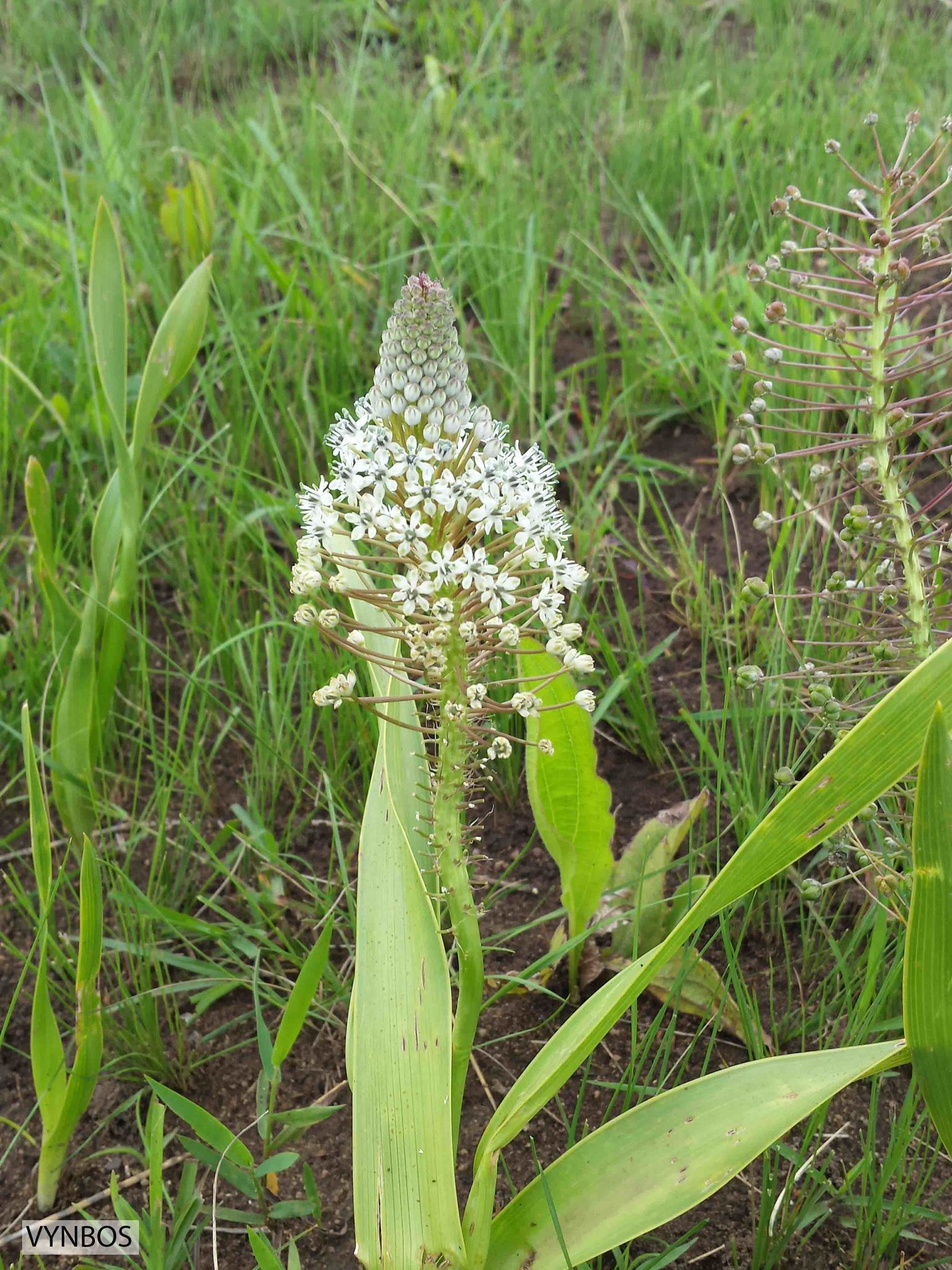

Scientific classification
- Kingdom: Plantae
- Clade: Tracheophytes
- Clade: Angiosperms
- Clade: Monocots
- Order: Asparagales
- Family: Asparagaceae
- Subfamily: Scilloideae
- Genus: Schizocarphus van der Merwe
- Species: S. nervosus

Binomial name
- Schizocarphus nervosus (Burch.) van der Merwe

= Schizocarphus =

Genus of flowering plants

Schizocarphus is a monotypic genus of bulbous flowering plants in the family Asparagaceae, subfamily Scilloideae (also treated as the family Hyacinthaceae). The sole species Schizocarphus nervosus is found in Africa, from Tanzania south to South Africa.
