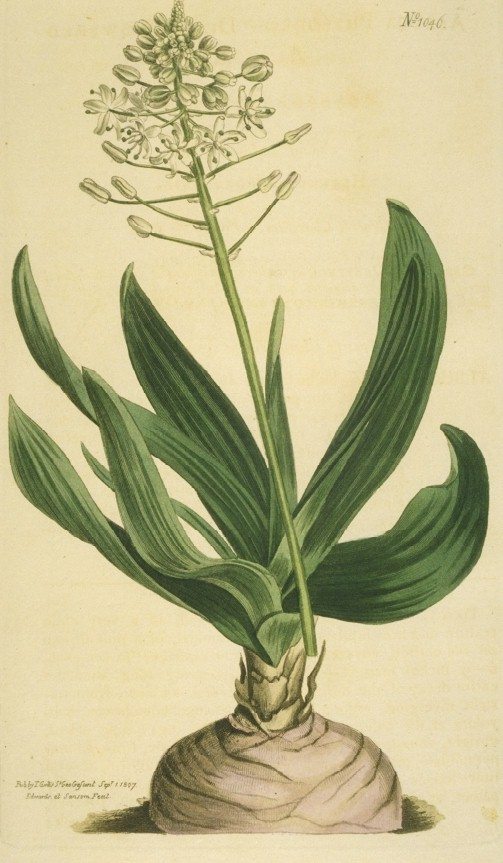
- Fusifilum physodes

Scientific classification
- Kingdom: Plantae
- Clade: Tracheophytes
- Clade: Angiosperms
- Clade: Monocots
- Order: Asparagales
- Family: Asparagaceae
- Subfamily: Scilloideae
- Genus: Fusifilum; Raf.

= Fusifilum =

Genus of flowering plants

Fusifilum is a genus of bulbous flowering plants in the family Asparagaceae, subfamily Scilloideae (also treated as the family Hyacinthaceae). It is distributed in southern Africa (South Africa, Lesotho, Swaziland, Namibia). Some sources consider that all the species should be placed in the genus Drimia.

== Systematics ==
The genus Fusifilum was created by Constantine Samuel Rafinesque-Schmaltz in 1837, the type species being F. physodes. In 2001, some species were moved from other genera (such as Drimia) into Fusifilum. Other species were newly created. A molecular phylogenetic analysis by Manning et al. in 2004 concluded that the genus was not monophyletic and that the species should all be placed in the genus Drimia.

Fusifilum is placed in the tribe Urgineeae (or the subfamily Urgineoideae by those who use the family Hyacinthaceae).

=== Species ===
As of April 2013, the World Checklist of Selected Plant Families recognized the following species:

- Fusifilum bruce-bayeri U.Müll.-Doblies, J.S.Tang & D.Müll.-Doblies
- Fusifilum capitatum (Hook.f.) Speta
- Fusifilum crenulatum U.Müll.-Doblies, J.S.Tang & D.Müll.-Doblies
- Fusifilum depressum (Baker) U.Müll.-Doblies, J.S.Tang & D.Müll.-Doblies
- Fusifilum emdeorum J.S.Tang & Weiglin
- Fusifilum gifbergense U.Müll.-Doblies, J.S.Tang & D.Müll.-Doblies
- Fusifilum glaucum U.Müll.-Doblies, J.S.Tang & D.Müll.-Doblies
- Fusifilum hei U.Müll.-Doblies, J.S.Tang & D.Müll.-Doblies
- Fusifilum magicum U.Müll.-Doblies, J.S.Tang & D.Müll.-Doblies
- Fusifilum minus (A.V.Duthie) Speta
- Fusifilum oliverorum U.Müll.-Doblies, J.S.Tang & D.Müll.-Doblies
- Fusifilum papillosum U.Müll.-Doblies, J.S.Tang & D.Müll.-Doblies
- Fusifilum physodes (Jacq.) Raf. ex Speta
- Fusifilum spirale U.Müll.-Doblies, J.S.Tang & D.Müll.-Doblies
- Fusifilum stoloniferum U.Müll.-Doblies, J.S.Tang & D.Müll.-Doblies
