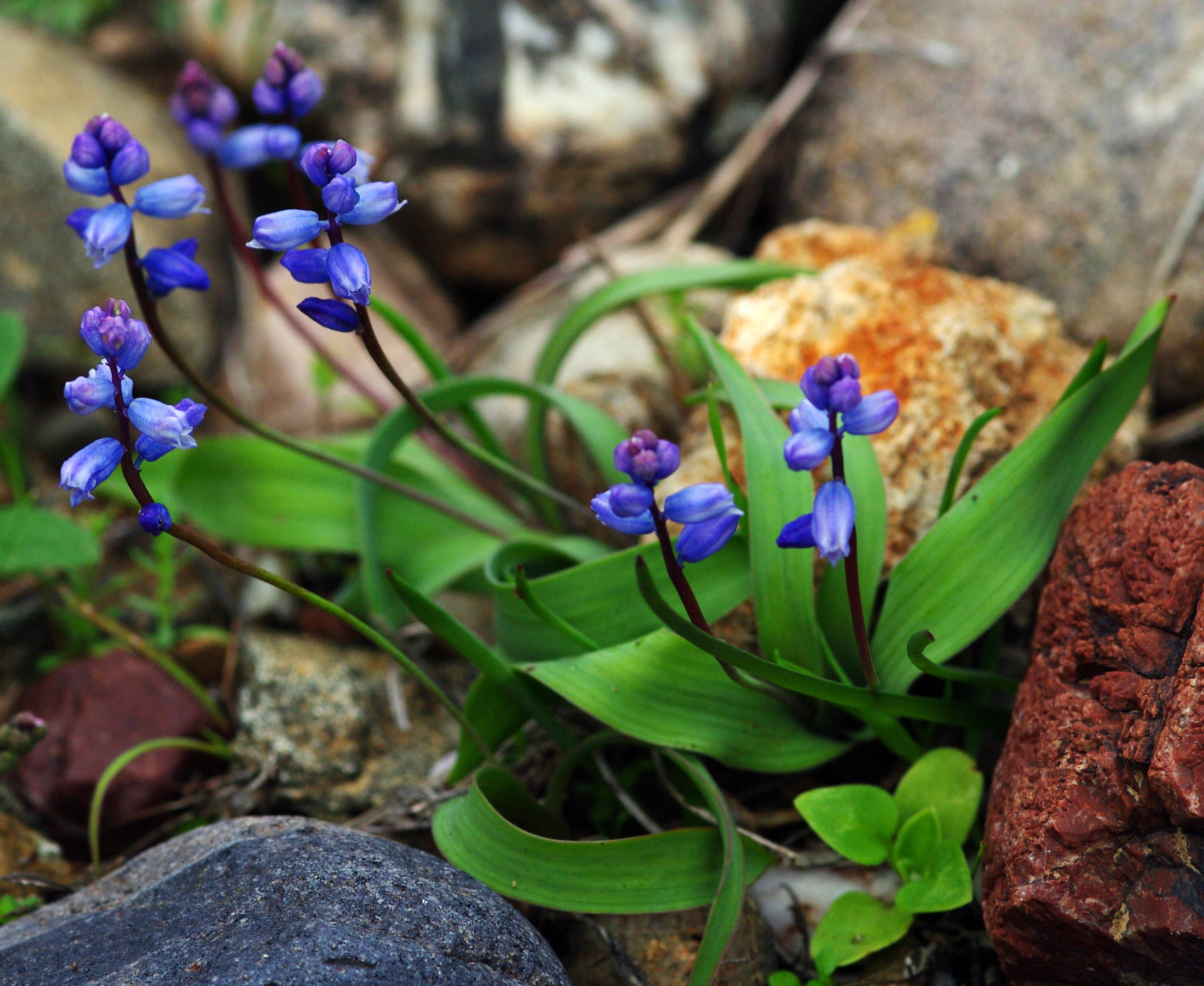
- Hyacinthella nervosa

Scientific classification
- Kingdom: Plantae
- Clade: Tracheophytes
- Clade: Angiosperms
- Clade: Monocots
- Order: Asparagales
- Family: Asparagaceae
- Subfamily: Scilloideae
- Genus: Hyacinthella; Schur

Type species
- Hyacinthella leucophaea (K.Koch) Schur

= Hyacinthella =

Genus of flowering plants

Hyacinthella is a genus of bulbous flowering plants in the family Asparagaceae, subfamily Scilloideae (formerly the family Hyacinthaceae). It is native to eastern and south-eastern Europe through to northern Iran, reaching as far south as Palestine. Turkey is the main country in which species are found.

== Description ==
Hyacinthella species grow from bulbs whose tunics often bear powdery white crystals. There are usually two or three basal leaves with prominent strands of fibre. The inflorescences consist of short spikes (racemes) of tubular flowers, each with six short lobes, in colours ranging from pale blue to deep violet. Heights vary from about 5 cm (2 in) to 25 cm (10 in), depending on the species. They grow in rocky habitats, such as hillsides, which are hot and dry in the summer.

== Species ==
As of July 2014, the World Checklist of Selected Plant Families accepted 17 species:

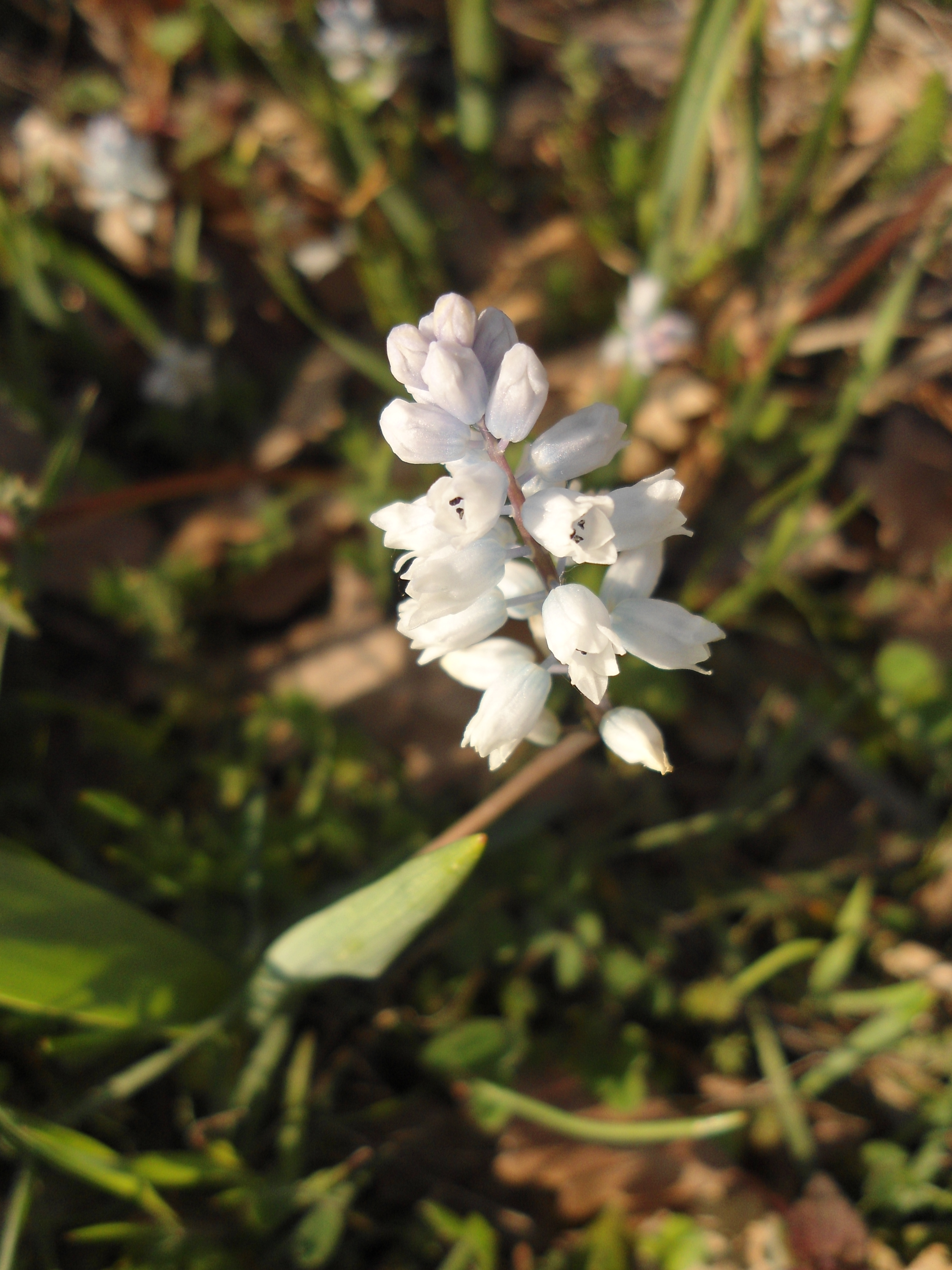
H. leucophaea

1. Hyacinthella acutiloba K.Perss. & Wendelbo - Turkey
2. Hyacinthella atropatana (Grossh.) Mordak & Zakhar. - Transcaucasus
3. Hyacinthella campanulata K.Perss. & Wendelbo - Turkey
4. Hyacinthella dalmatica Chouard - Croatia
5. Hyacinthella glabrescens (Boiss.) K.Perss. & Wendelbo - Turkey
6. Hyacinthella heldreichii (Boiss.) Chouard - Turkey
7. Hyacinthella hispida (J.Gay) Chouard - Turkey
8. Hyacinthella lazulina K.Perss.& Jim.Perss. - Turkey
9. Hyacinthella leucophaea (K.Koch) Schur - Balkans, Russia, Ukraine
10. Hyacinthella lineata (Steud. ex Schult. & Schult.f.) Chouard - Turkey
11. Hyacinthella micrantha (Boiss.) Chouard - Turkey
12. Hyacinthella millingenii (Post) Feinbrun - Turkey, Cyprus
13. Hyacinthella nervosa (Bertol.) Chouard - Turkey, Syria, Lebanon, Palestine, Israel, Jordan
14. Hyacinthella pallasiana (Steven) Losinsk. - Russia, Ukraine
15. Hyacinthella persica (Boiss. & Buhse) Chouard - Iran
16. Hyacinthella siirtensis B.Mathew - Turkey
17. Hyacinthella venusta K.Perss. - Turkey

== Cultivation ==
Some species are in cultivation, where they require a dry summer rest and are not suitable for growing in the open garden in areas with cooler, wetter summers.
