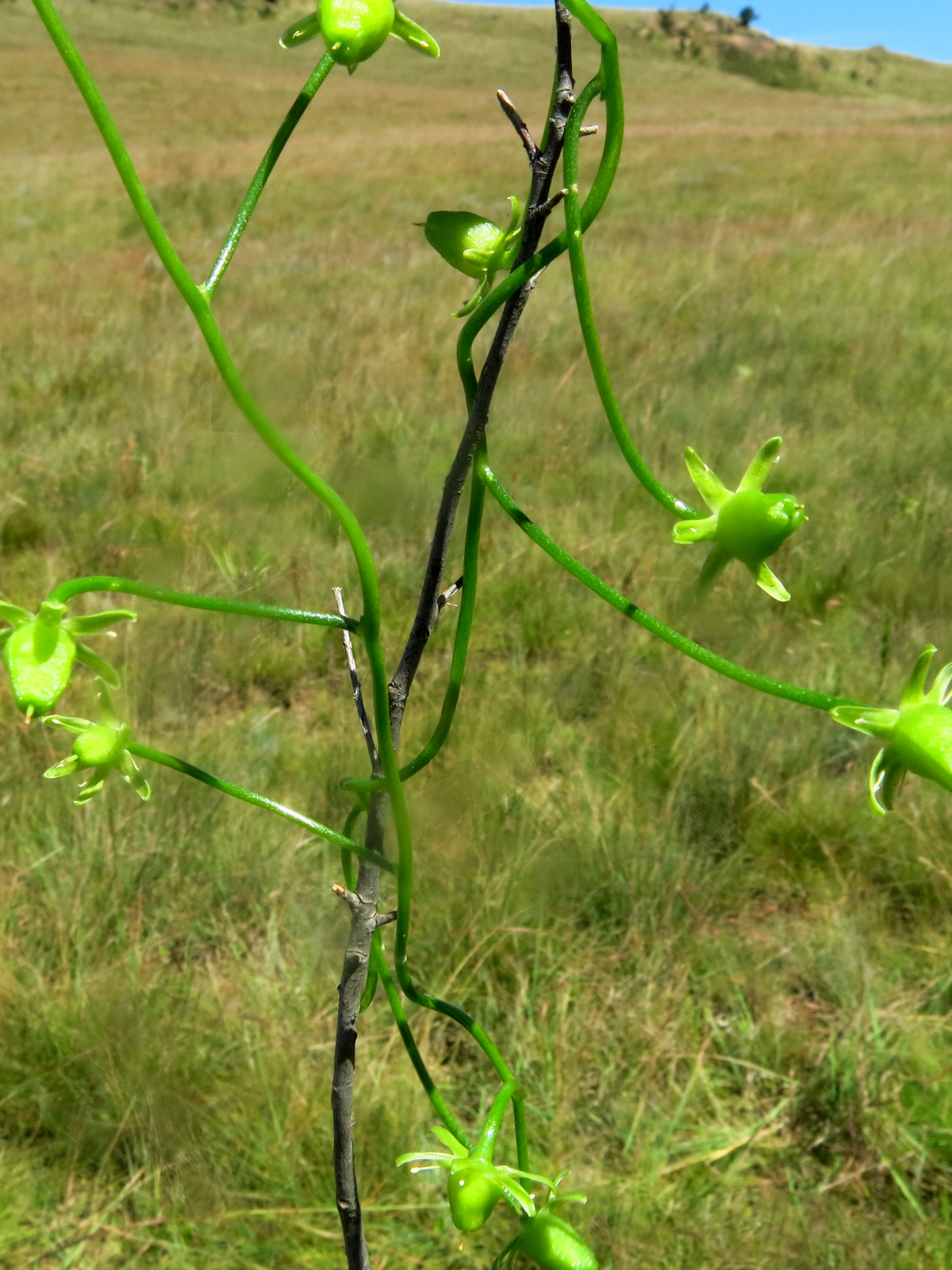

Scientific classification
- Kingdom: Plantae
- Clade: Tracheophytes
- Clade: Angiosperms
- Clade: Monocots
- Order: Asparagales
- Family: Asparagaceae
- Subfamily: Scilloideae
- Genus: Bowiea; Harv. ex T.Moore & Mast.
- Species: B. volubilis

Binomial name
- Bowiea volubilis Harv. ex T.Moore & Mast.

Synonyms
- Ophiobostryx Skeels; Schizobasopsis J.F.Macbr.; Ophiobostryx volubilis (Harv. ex Hook.f.) Skeels; Schizobasopsis volubilis (Harv. ex Hook.f.) J.F.Macbr.; Bowiea gariepensis van Jaarsv.; Bowiea kilimandscharica Mildbr.

= Bowiea =

Climbing-onion

Genus of flowering plants

Bowiea, commonly known as climbing-onion, is a genus of extremely poisonous, bulbous, perennial, succulent plants which thrive in dry and desert regions of eastern and southern Africa, ranging from Uganda to South Africa. It is native to a region stretching from Kenya to Cape Province. It is the 14th most commonly sold medicinal plant in South Africa, used to treat various health conditions. Due to massive harvesting, populations of this plant have been significantly reduced. Due to its unique appearance, it is sometimes cultivated as a houseplant.

The genus contains a single species, Bowiea volubilis, named after the nineteenth-century British plant collector at Kew, James Bowie. The specific epithet means twisting or winding in Latin.

== Geographical range ==
Within the species, two subspecies with distinct geographical ranges have been identified. The subspecies Bowiea subsp. volubilis is found in the area stretching from tropical East Africa (Kenya, Tanzania, and Uganda) to Mozambique, Zimbabwe, Malawi, Angola, and the southeastern part of South Africa. In South Africa, it occurs in the Eastern Cape Province, KwaZulu-Natal, Mpumalanga, Gauteng, and Limpopo.

The subspecies B. subsp. gariepensis is found in southern Namibia and in the western part of the Northern Cape Province in South Africa, primarily in the eastern portion of the rocky Gariep Desert.

== Description ==
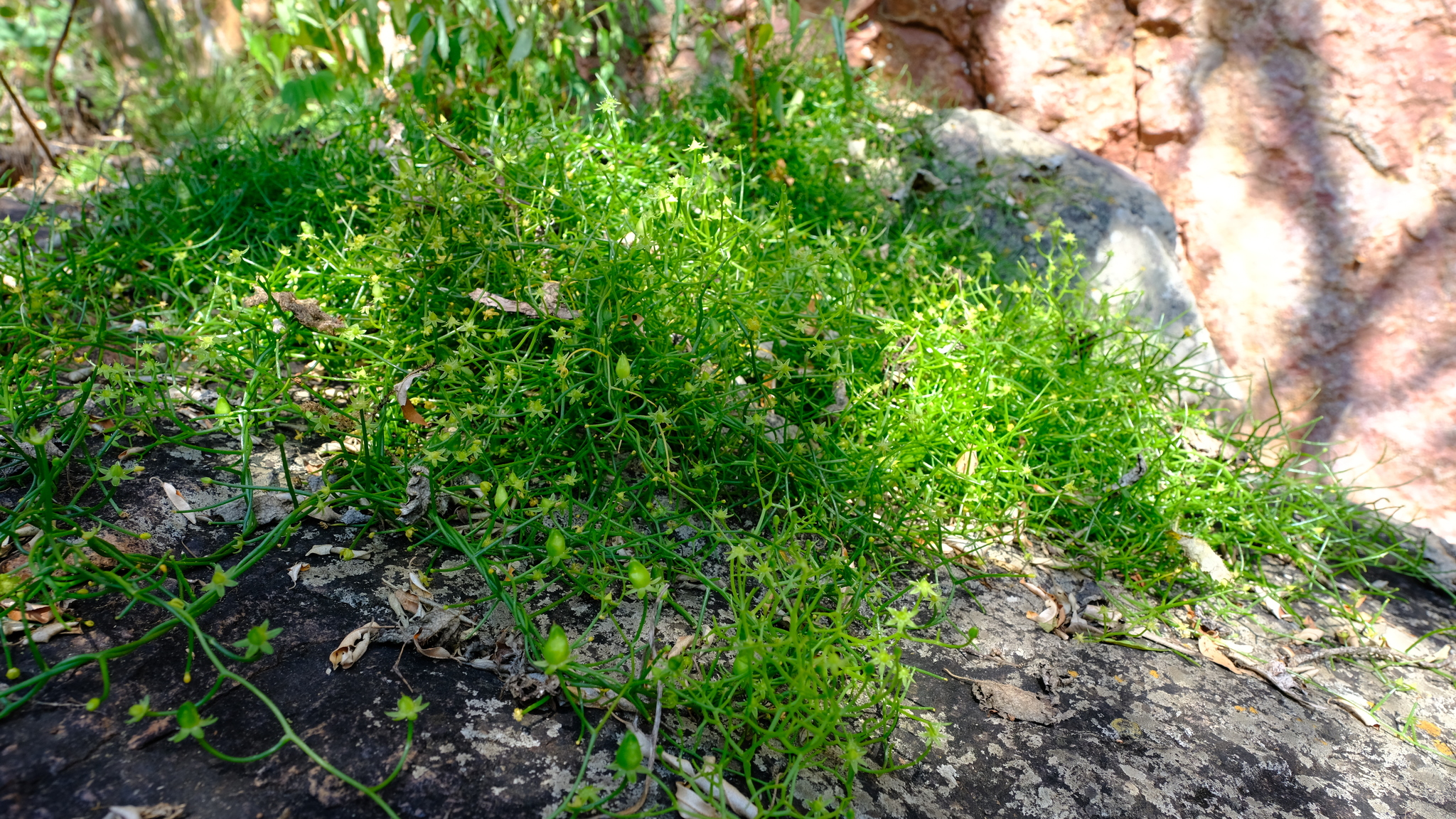
Habit

=== Habit ===
Perennial, herbaceous climbing plants.

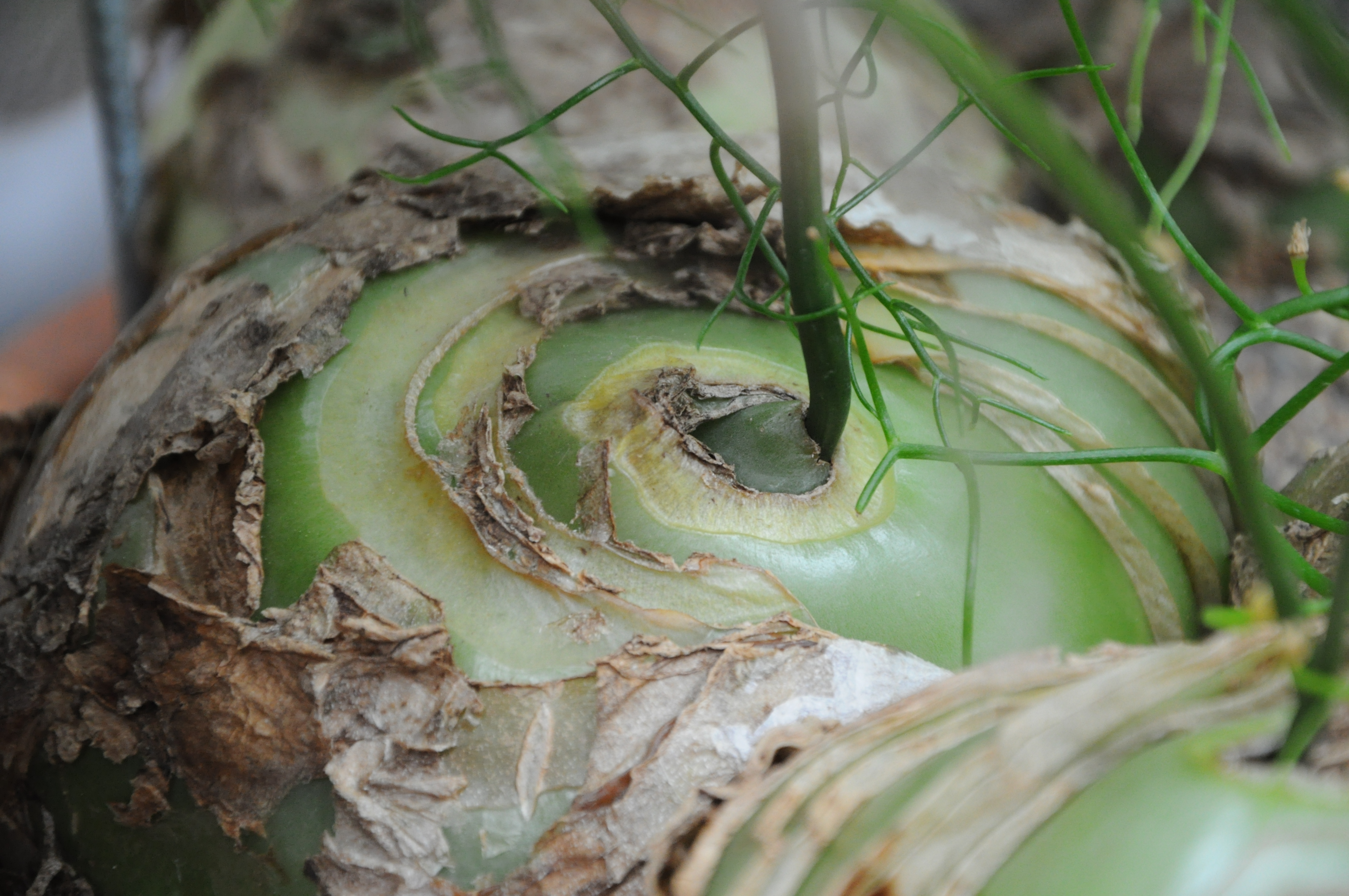
Bulb

=== Stem ===
The plants have many overlapping succulent scales, which form a tight, pale green, spherical bulb that grows to 20 cm (7.9 in) above the soil, sending up a twining fresh-green branched stem up to 4.5 m (15 ft) in length, resembling green spaghetti, with few linear deciduous leaves. The bulbs have a sympodial structure, and the terminal bud, forming both daughter bulbs and flower stem primordia, is located at the base of the innermost storage leaf. There are few stomata on the outer surface of the storage leaves, and their volume consists of a large-celled ground tissue, storing water. Dormant in winter, when the outer scales and many of the scale tips dry to a paper-like state, the plants burst to growth in late spring or summer, producing one or more very fast-growing stems that needs to be supported by a trellis or stake. The stems are covered with many leafless side-branches that may fall off. The small greenish-white flowers appear in spring.

=== Leaves ===
Short-lived, fleshy, lanceolate-linear, channelled leaves are only formed by young, immature individuals.

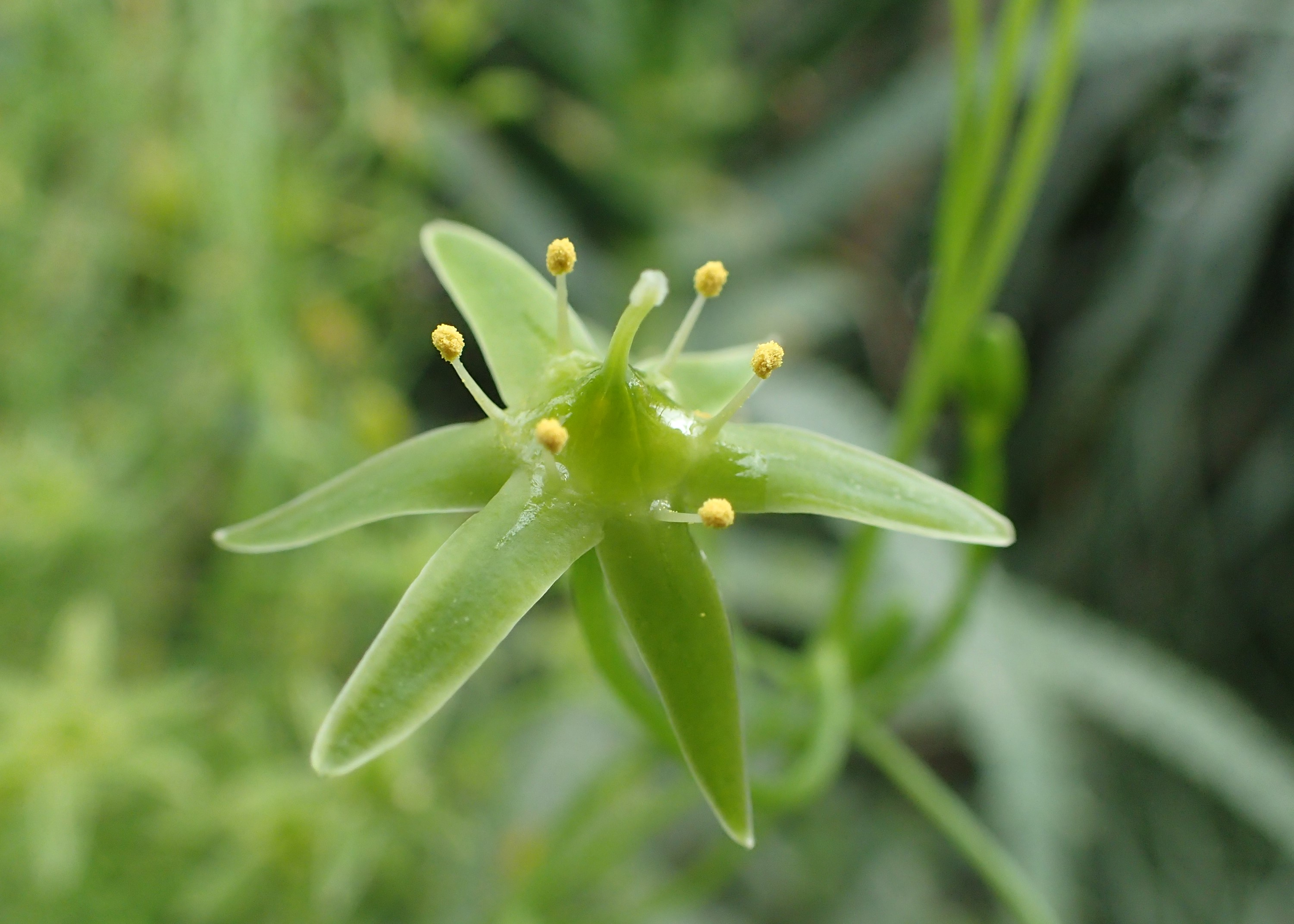
Flower of B. subsp. volubilis

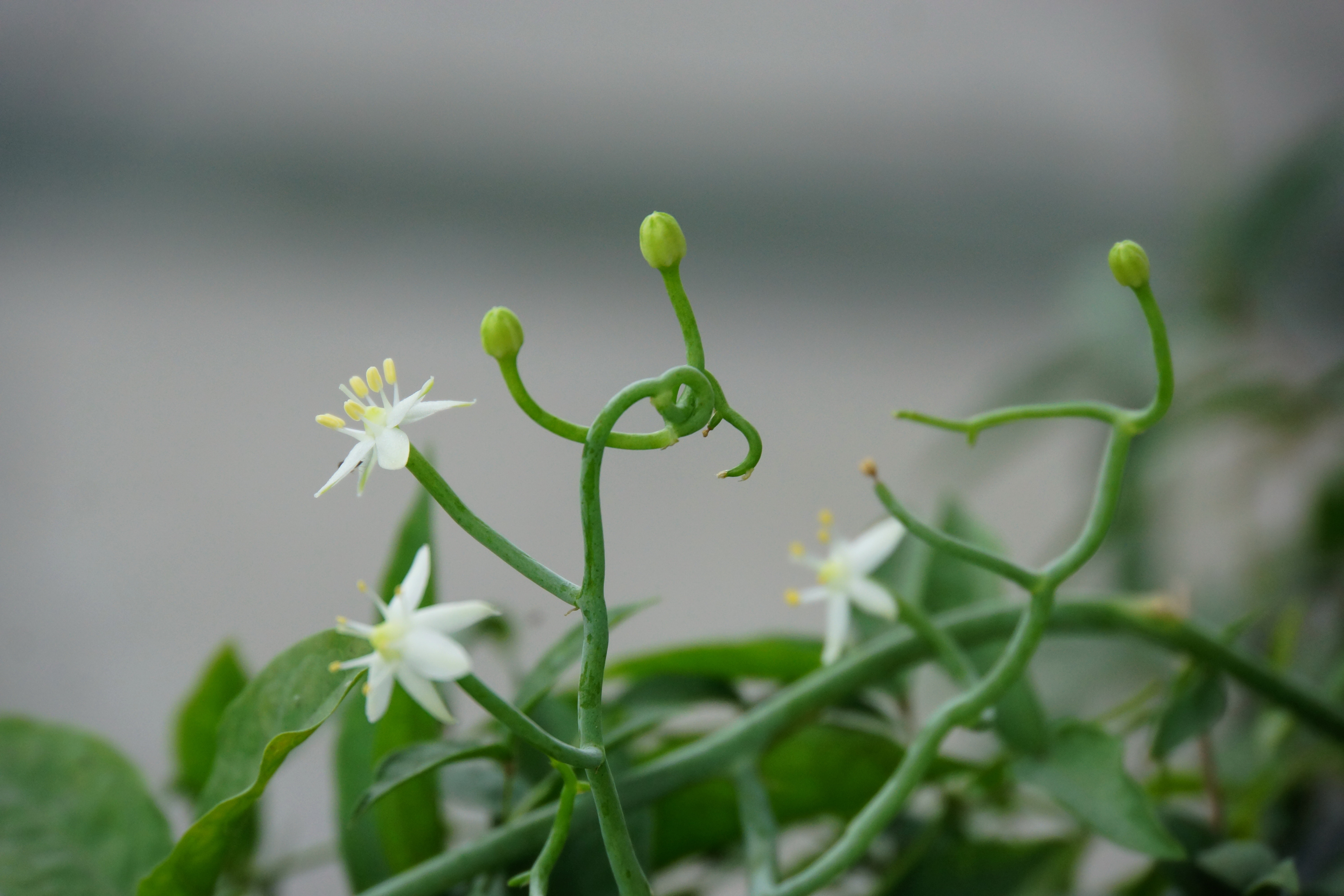
Flower of B. subsp. gariepensis

=== Flowers ===
The annual, photosynthetic, climbing flower stem is twisted or spreading, highly branched, with needle-like branches up to 7 cm long, slightly fleshy, blue to blue-green in the subspecies gariepensis, reaching up to 1.2 m in length, and green in the subspecies volubilis, up to 10 m long (usually 3–4 m, and typically up to 2 m in container-grown plants). The bracts are lanceolate and pointed. The pedicels are arching, measuring 2–5 cm in length. The inflorescence is described as a branched raceme with unisexual flowers in the lower section. The flowers have an unpleasant odor and are long-lasting. The perianth is radial, six-lobed, white (B. subsp. gariepensis) or green to yellowish-green (B. subsp. volubilis). The perianth segments are equal, free, lanceolate to oblong, with edges turned and unwound outward towards the base and slightly pointed tips, spreading to recurved, measuring 12 mm in length and 3.5 mm in width. There are six almost erect stamens, with narrowly triangular to filiform filaments, and oblong heads. The ovary is sessile, semi-inferior, three-chambered, broad-conical, light green, sticky in the upper part, containing about 5 ovules in each chamber. The carpel is syncarpous, with a short, round stigma, ending in a three-branched stigma.

=== Fruits ===
Three-chambered, erect capsules, measuring 9–25 mm in size, spherical and flattened with notched valves (subsp. gariepensis) or cone-shaped with pointed valves (subsp. volubilis), papery, splitting longitudinally, with remnants of perianth segments at the base, containing black, shiny, angular, oblong and flattened seeds up to 10 mm in length.

=== Similar species ===
Species of the genus Drimia, classified in the section Schizobasis (formerly classified as a separate genus), which have upright (non-climbing), non-fleshy flower stems and short-lived flowers with an upper ovary, slightly fused at the base perianth segments, which fall off before fruiting. These plants were previously considered related, but their similarity results from convergent evolution.

== Biology and ecology ==
=== Habitat and development ===
Bowiea subsp. volubilis occurs at low to medium altitudes, usually along mountain ranges, in densely vegetated river valleys, under clumps of bushes, and on boulders. The species has also been recorded on the edges of the Karoo and in bushy ravines (kloof). This subspecies also occurs in open forests or on steep rocky hillsides, usually in well-shaded areas. It tolerates both wet and dry conditions, mainly growing in areas with summer rainfall, with annual precipitation ranging from 200 to 800 mm. It blooms in spring and summer. Individual specimens live for about 10 years (at least under cultivation).

B. subsp. gariepensis inhabits cooler screes in the Orange River valley. It blooms in autumn and winter.

The flowers of these plants, with a scent considered unpleasant, are pollinated by flies from the families Tachinidae and Muscidae, as well as Vespidae.

After fruiting, the aboveground parts of both subspecies die off, and the plants enter a period of dormancy.

=== Phytochemical characteristics ===
The plant is highly poisonous. All parts of Bowiea contain several active cardiac glycosides, including bufadienolide glycosides. The bulbs of this plant also contain compounds such as boworuboside, bowocryptoside, hellebrigenin, and various polysaccharides.

=== Genetics ===
The chromosome number (2n) of both subspecies is 20. The chromosomal complement consists of two pairs of large (LSt), two pairs of medium-sized (MSt), and three pairs of small (SSt) subacrocentric chromosomes, as well as three pairs of small submetacentric chromosomes (SSm).

== Species ==
=== Taxonomic position ===
The species belongs to the monotypic genus Bowiea, which in classification systems of the second decade of the 21st century (including the APG IV system) is placed in the tribe Urgineeae, subfamily Scilloideae, within the family Asparagaceae. The genus is sister to the genus Drimia.

Historically, the genus was classified in the family Hyacinthaceae. In the Takhtajan system from 1997, the genus Bowiea was classified, together with the genus Schizobasis (now included in the genus Drimia), in the tribe Bowieae Hutch. in the family Hyacinthaceae in the order Amaryllidales. In the Takhtajan system from 2009, the author classified the genus in the subfamily Urgineoideae within the family Hyacinthaceae. In the Reveal system from 2007, the genus was classified in the subtribe Bowieinae within the tribe Bowieae in the family Hyacinthaceae.

=== Species division ===
One species is recognized, with two subspecies

- Bowiea volubilis (climbing-onion, sea onion)
  - Bowiea volubilis subsp. gariepensis (van Jaarsv.) Bruyns – Namibia, Cape Province
  - Bowiea volubilis subsp. volubilis – from Cape Province to Kenya

=== Nomenclatural type ===
The holotype of Bowiea subsp. gariepensis, collected in 1982 on Groot Pellaberg mountain near the town of Pofadder in South Africa, is stored in the herbarium of Kirstenbosch National Botanical Garden in Cape Town.

== Threats and preservation ==
The subspecies Bowiea volubilis has been listed on the Red List of South African Plants as vulnerable species. This plant is under significant pressure due to harvesting for medicinal purposes across most of its range. Between 1977 and 2007, the population decline of this subspecies in South Africa exceeded 30%. Over the past 10 years, a 40% decline has been recorded in the monitored subpopulation in one of the private nature reserves, and another known subpopulation has been completely destroyed. In 2000, South African authorities confiscated 1,300 illegally collected bulbs of this plant.

Bowiea subsp. gariepensis has been listed on the Red List of South African Plants with a status of least concern.

== Uses ==
=== Medicinal ===
Even though this plant is highly toxic, traditional healers in South Africa have long used Bowiea as a herbal remedy for various ailments, particularly for skin diseases, eye irritation, palpitations, headaches, muscle pains, infertility, urinary tract infections, and sexually transmitted diseases. When combined with other plants, it is also used as an antiparasitic for infants, for hepatitis, pelvic pain in women, and jaundice in children. The plant is also used to induce abortion. An enema of bulb infusion is used for impotence.

A decoction of the bulbs is used by the Xhosa people as a laxative, while the Mfengu and Mpondo use ground roasted bulbs for the same purpose. Zulu people use a water extract from the fresh outer scales as a remedy for ascites, infertility, urinary tract infections, back pain, and muscle pains. Swazi people use a decoction of Bowiea and Boophane disticha bulbs for scabies. In traditional medicine in the Western Cape Province, the bulbs are applied topically for skin rashes, acne, cuts, burns, and insect bites. Bulbs are also used in KwaZulu-Natal to prepare mixtures to facilitate childbirth, treat headaches, and infertility.

The cardiac glycosides present in these plants have cardiotonic, laxative, irritant, emetic, anti-inflammatory, antibacterial, and antifungal properties. The effect of glycosides present in the bulbs is 30 times stronger than those of foxglove glycosides, and those present in the flowers are 60 times stronger.

Due to the presence of cardiac glycosides, the entire plant is highly poisonous. Symptoms of overdose include vomiting, hypersalivation, arrhythmia, and spasms, which can lead to death within minutes or hours (depending on the dosage). Autopsies of individuals who died from poisoning by this plant showed irritation of the digestive system, congestion of the liver and other internal organs, and cardiac arrest during the diastolic phase.

=== Ornamental ===
Due to its unusual appearance, Bowiea is cultivated as an ornamental plant, especially as a houseplant (referred to as "extraordinary" and "a true curiosity").

=== Magical ===
In Africa, this plant is regarded as having magical properties. It is believed that it makes warriors brave and invincible, protects travelers, and enables the release of love. Bowiea is also believed to repel bandits and protect homes from lightning and hail. A decoction of the bulbs is taken orally as a remedy for idliso caused by witchcraft.

== Cultivation ==
The plant is described as very easy to grow.

=== Requirements ===
The soil should be porous and well-draining – it's recommended to use standard cactus soil, according to some authors, in weathered clay. The container should be wide and rather shallow. Plants should be repotted every two years, in spring, or as needed (e.g., when there are many offsets). The location should be bright, sunny (it won't bloom in areas without direct sunlight). It requires regular but moderate watering during the growing season (some sources specify that watering every 10 days is sufficient). Bulbs should not be soaked as their coverings easily rot. Fertilization according to different authors is recommended once or twice a season or once a month. The plant needs support as the flower stalks do not form tendrils. In natural conditions, plants go through a dormant period once a year, during which the flower stalk dies. In indoor conditions, the plant can remain evergreen, but if it enters a dormant period (which happens in summer), watering should be reduced to once a week until a new shoot appears (according to other sources, watering and fertilizing should be completely suspended during this time). Some authors recommend moving the bulb into a cool place during dormancy – at a temperature of about 10 °C or even slightly lower.

=== Propagation ===
Plants are propagated from seeds, offsets (often numerous in cultivation next to the parent bulb), or by rooting cuttings of the bulb's storage leaves, which produce offsets on the cut surface.

=== Pests ===
They are usually not present, but mealybugs, armored scale insects, and various aphids can appear.
