= Namophila =

Scientific classification
- Kingdom: Plantae
- Clade: Tracheophytes
- Clade: Angiosperms
- Clade: Monocots
- Order: Asparagales
- Family: Asparagaceae
- Subfamily: Scilloideae
- Genus: Namophila; U.Müll.-Doblies & D.Müll.-Doblies
- Species: N. urotepala

Binomial name
- Namophila urotepala U.Müll.-Doblies & D.Müll.-Doblies

Genus of flowering plants

Namophila is a monotypic genus of bulbous flowering plants in the family Asparagaceae, subfamily Scilloideae (also treated as the family Hyacinthaceae). The sole species Namophila urotepala is endemic to Namibia.

== Description ==
Namophila urotepala grows from an underground bulb, which has a dark brown papery tunic. The bulb produces only two somewhat succulent leaves which spread out on the ground on either side. The flowers are produced in a several-flowered raceme borne on a very short stem so that the inflorescence is at ground level. At the top of the inflorescence is a tuft of bracts. Individual flowers are more-or-less upright, bell-shaped with fused greenish-white tepals which end in a thin "tail". The stamens are also more-or-less upright, with their filaments joined to the mouth of the tubular part of the tepals. The fruiting capsule remains enclosed in the tepals. The black seeds are somewhat globular.

Namophila urotepala is found only in the mountains of southern Namibia, in arid areas with winter rainfall.

== Systematics ==
The genus and species were named by Ute Müller-Doblies and Dietrich Müller-Doblies in 1997. Placed in the tribe Hyacintheae (or subfamily Hyacinthoideae by those who use the family Hyacinthaceae), Namophila is most closely related to Lachenalia.
