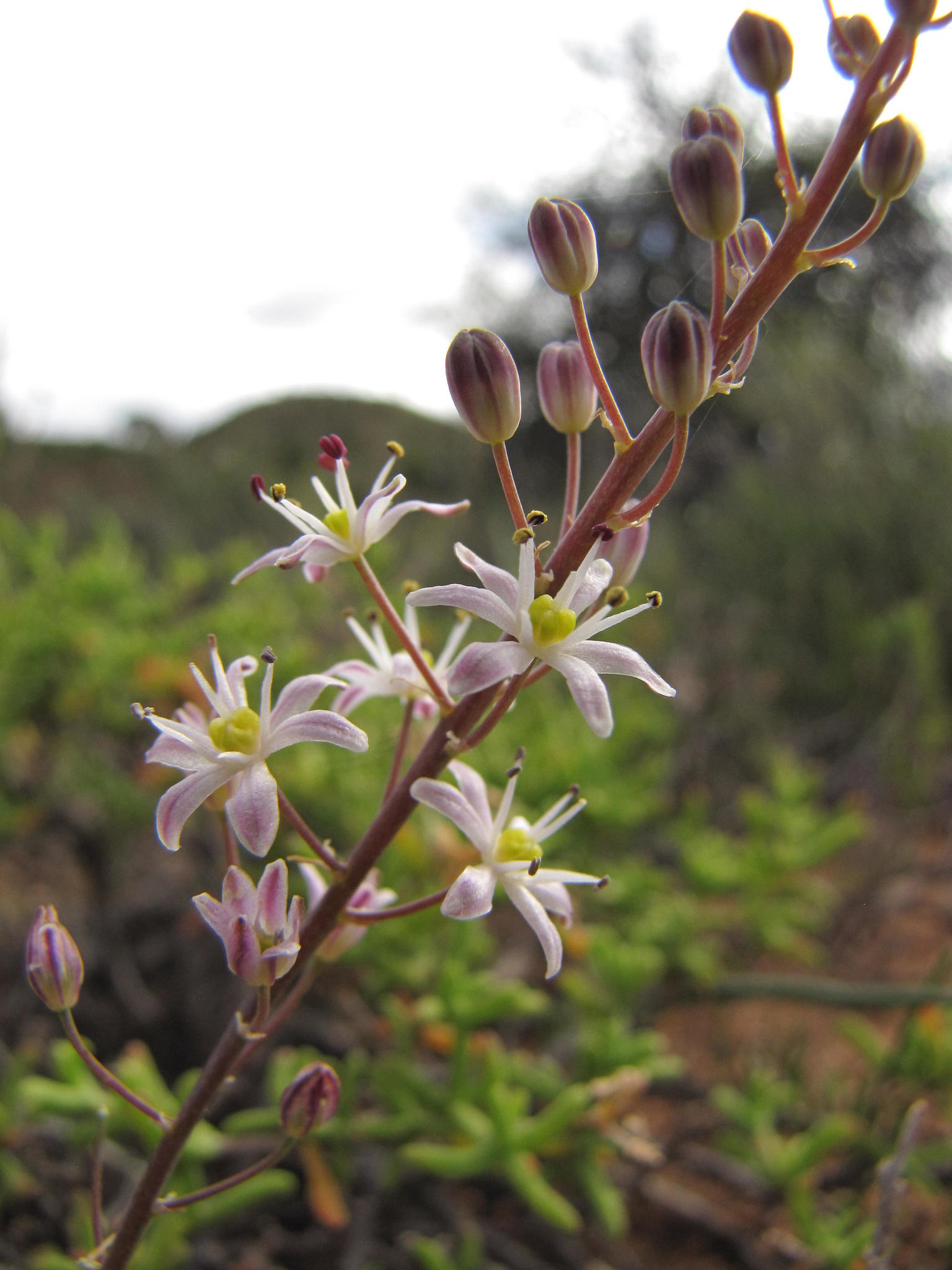

Scientific classification
- Kingdom: Plantae
- Clade: Tracheophytes
- Clade: Angiosperms
- Clade: Monocots
- Order: Asparagales
- Family: Asparagaceae
- Subfamily: Scilloideae
- Genus: Pseudoprospero; Speta
- Species: P. firmifolium

Binomial name
- Pseudoprospero firmifolium (Baker) Speta

= Pseudoprospero =

Genus of flowering plants

Pseudoprospero is a genus of bulbous flowering plants in the family Asparagaceae, subfamily Scilloideae (also treated as the family Hyacinthaceae). The genus has a single species Pseudoprospero firmifolium, which is endemic to South Africa (the Cape Province, KwaZulu-Natal).

== Description ==
Pseudoprospero firmifolium grows from an underground bulb whose tunic has dry, paper-like outer layers. The channelled linear leaves are evergreen. The flowers are borne in a loose many-flowered raceme, which usually has a side branch. Individual flowers have white to lilac tepals which are joined at the base and persist into the fruiting stage. The stamens are more-or-less erect, with filaments joined at the base to the tepals and to each other. The seeds are black.

== Systematics ==
From the 1970s onwards, Franz Speta and co-workers split up the broadly defined genus Scilla, placing many of its species into separate genera. One of these genera was Pseudoprospero, created by Speta in 1998 for the former Scilla firmifolia. Subsequent studies have confirmed that Pseudoprospero firmifolium is distinct not only from Scilla but from all other genera in the tribe Hyacintheae (or the subfamily Hyacinthoideae for those who accept the family Hyacinthaceae), being placed in its own subtribe. (Note: Manning, Goldblatt & Fay (2004) place Pseudoprospero as the sole genus in the family Hyacinthaceae, subfamily Hyacinthoideae, tribe Pseudoprospereae, equivalent to the classification family Asparagaceae, subfamily Scilloideae, tribe Hyacintheae, subtribe "Pseudoprosperinae", although this last name appears not to have been published.)

== Subspecies ==
Two subspecies are recognised:

- Pseudoprospero firmifolium subsp. firmifolium – Cape Province
- Pseudoprospero firmifolium subsp. natalensis J.C.Manning – KwaZulu-Natal

== Chemistry ==
The following five homoisoflavanones can be isolated from the dichloromethane extract of the bulbs of P. firmifolium:

- 3,5-dihydroxy-7,8-dimethoxy-3-(3',4'-dimethoxybenzyl)-4-chromanone
- 3,5-dihydroxy-7-methoxy-3-(3',4'-dimethoxybenzyl)-4-chromanone
- 3,5-dihydroxy-7,8-dimethoxy-3-(3'-hydroxy-4'-methoxybenzyl)-4-chromanone
- 3,5,6-trihydroxy-7-methoxy-3-(3'-hydroxy-4'-methoxybenzyl)-4-chromanone
- 3,5,7-trihydroxy-3-(3'-hydroxy-4'methoxybenzyl)-4-chromanone
