= Zagrosia =

Scientific classification
- Kingdom: Plantae
- Clade: Tracheophytes
- Clade: Angiosperms
- Clade: Monocots
- Order: Asparagales
- Family: Asparagaceae
- Subfamily: Scilloideae
- Genus: Zagrosia; Speta
- Species: Z. persica

Binomial name
- Zagrosia persica (Hausskn.) Speta

Genus of flowering plants

Zagrosia is a monotypic genus of bulbous flowering plants in the family Asparagaceae, subfamily Scilloideae (also treated as the family Hyacinthaceae). The sole species Zagrosia persica is found in south-east Turkey through Iraq to west Iran.
