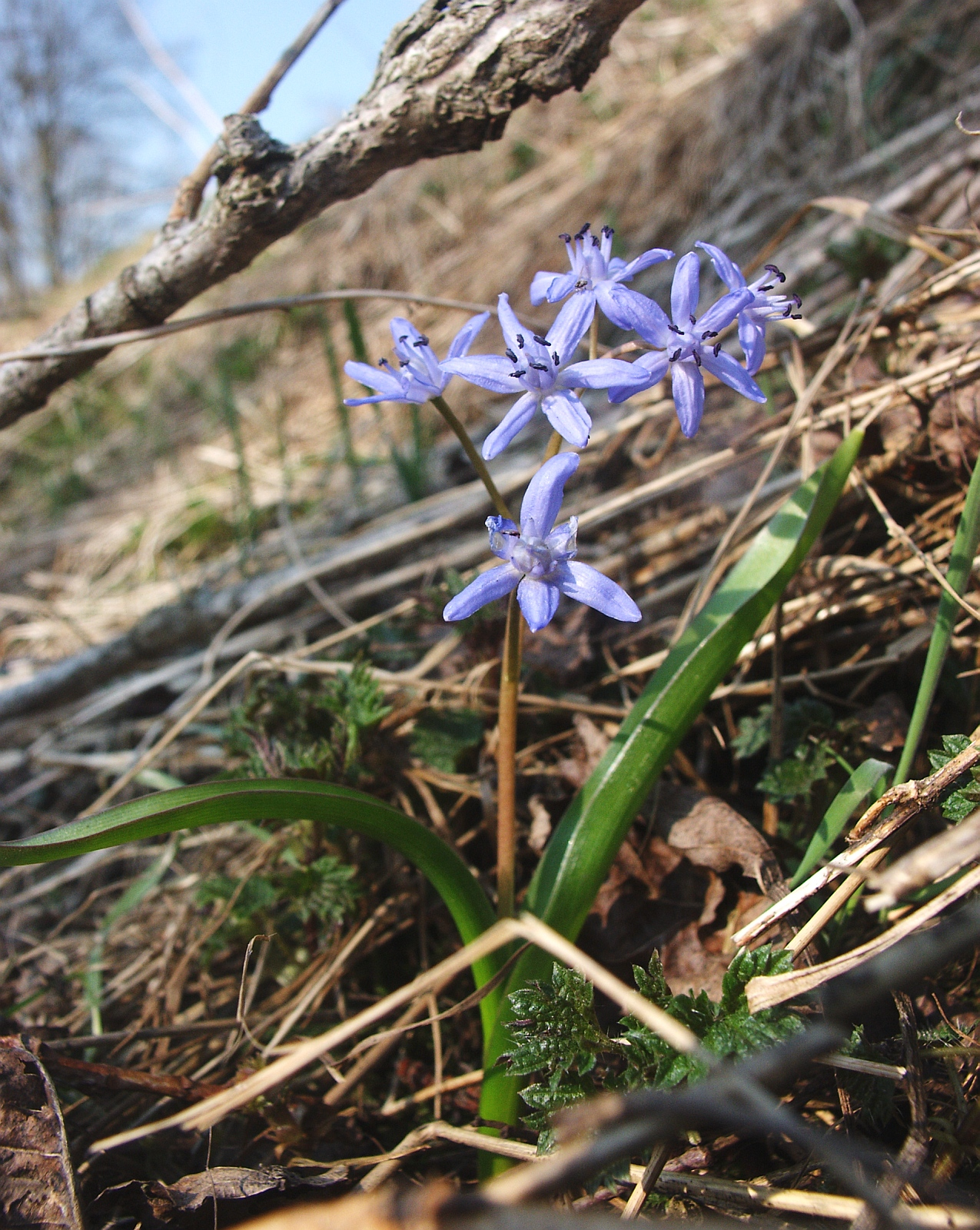
- Scilla bifolia

Scientific classification
- Kingdom: Plantae
- Clade: Tracheophytes
- Clade: Angiosperms
- Clade: Monocots
- Order: Asparagales
- Family: Asparagaceae
- Subfamily: Scilloideae; Burnett

Genera
- See text

Synonyms
- Hyacinthaceae Batsch ex Bork.; Scilleae

= Scilloideae =

Subfamily of bulbous monocot plants

Scilloideae (named after the genus Scilla, "squill") is a subfamily of bulbous plants within the family Asparagaceae. Scilloideae is sometimes treated as a separate family Hyacinthaceae, named after the genus Hyacinthus. This subfamily contains many popular spring-flowering garden bulbs, such as hyacinths (Hyacinthus), grape hyacinths (Muscari), Puschkinia, bluebells (Hyacinthoides) and squills (Scilla)

Scilloideae are distributed mostly in Mediterranean climates, including South Africa, Central Asia and South America. Their flowers have six tepals and six stamens with a superior ovary, which previously placed them within the lily family (Liliaceae), and their leaves are fleshy, mucilaginous, and arranged in a basal rosette.

The Scilloideae, like most lily-like monocots, were at one time placed in a very broadly defined lily family (Liliaceae). The subfamily is recognized in modern classification systems such as the APG III system of 2009. It is also treated as the separate family Hyacinthaceae, as it is by many researchers and was in earlier APG systems. Determining the boundaries between genera within the Scilloideae is an active area of research. The number of genera varies widely from source to source, from about 30 to about 70. The situation has been described as being in a "state of flux".

== Description ==
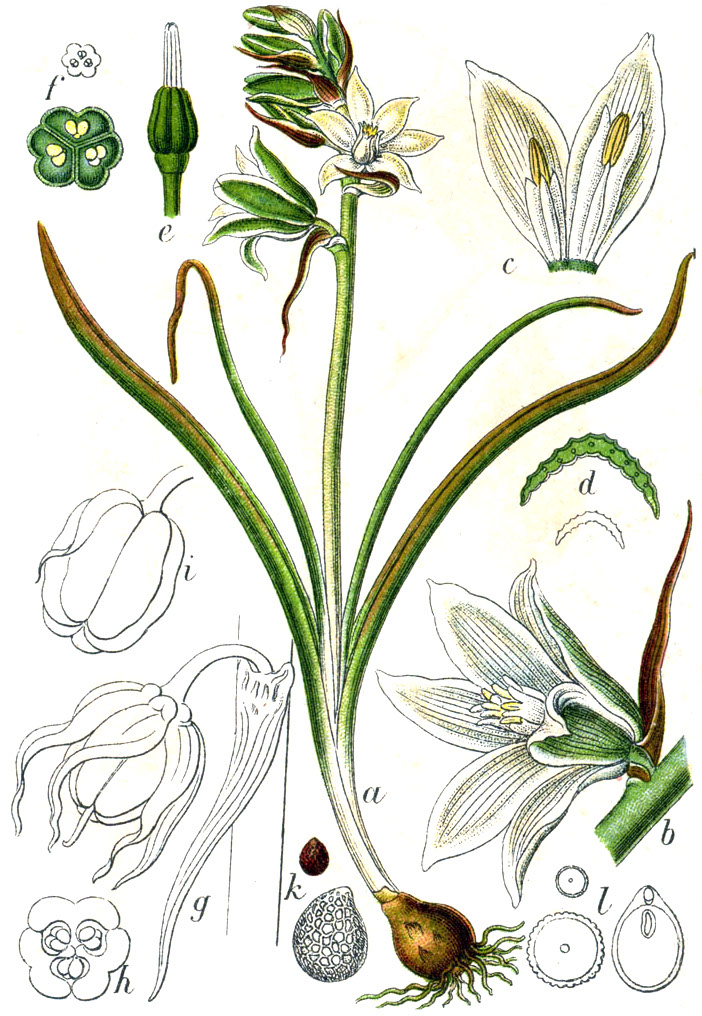
Ornithogalum

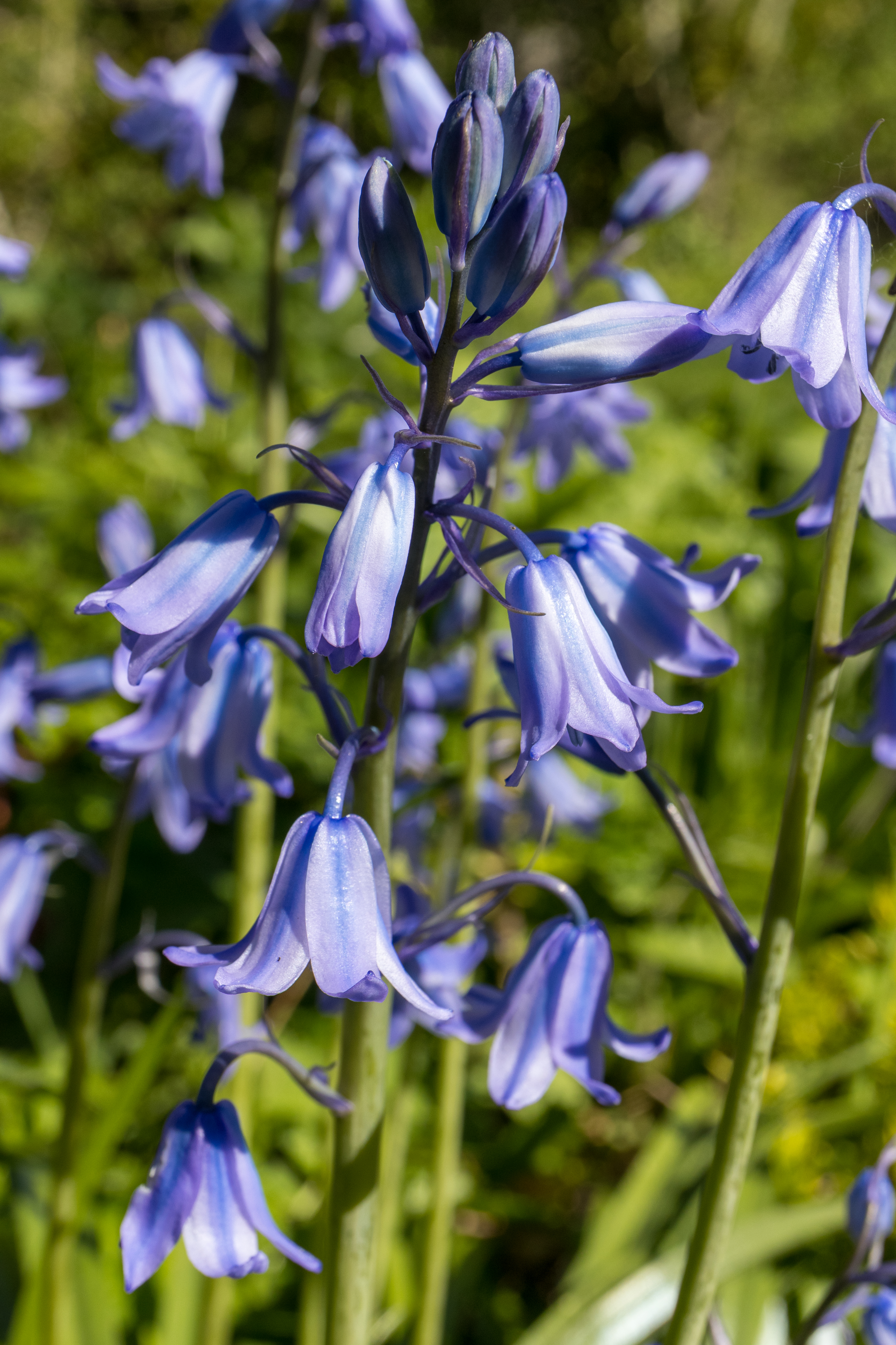
Inflorescence of Hyacinthoides

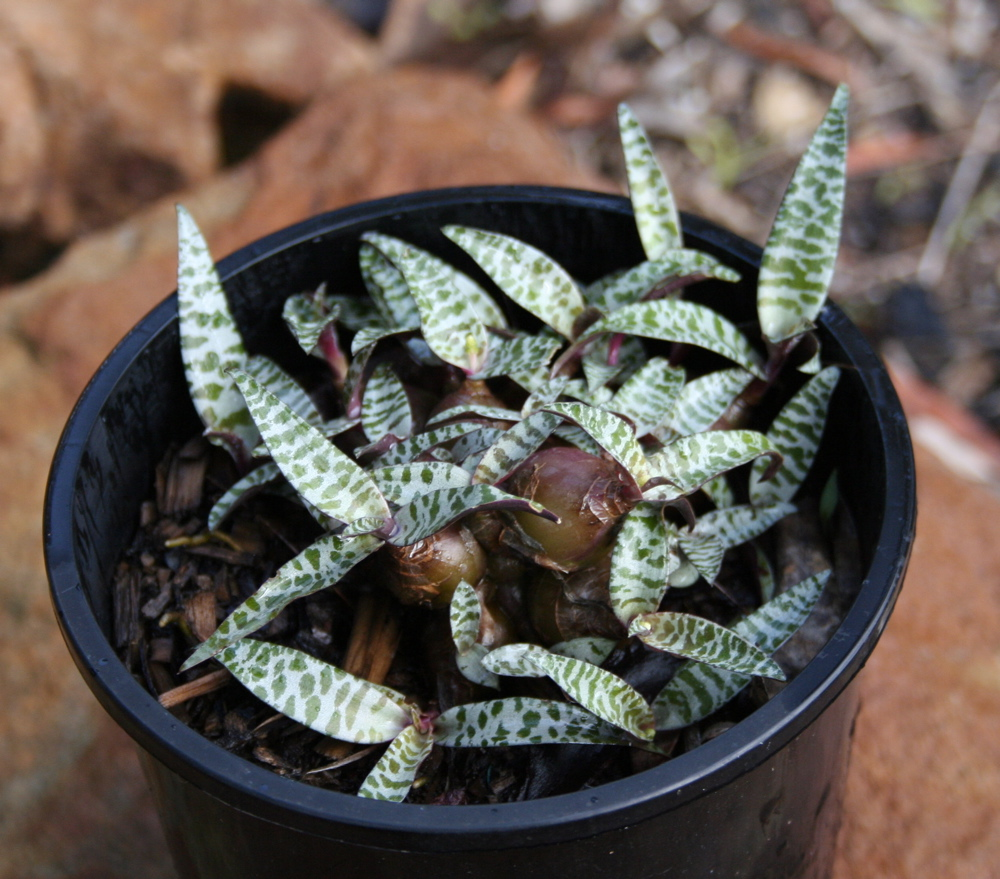
Leaves and bulbs of Ledebouria

The subfamily contains many popular spring-flowering garden bulbs, such as hyacinths (Hyacinthus), grape hyacinths (Muscari), bluebells (Hyacinthoides) and squills (Scilla). Other members are summer- and autumn-flowering, including Galtonia and Eucomis ('pineapple lilies'). Most are native to Mediterranean climate zones and neighboring areas in the Mediterranean Basin and South Africa. Others are found in Central Asia, the Far East and South America.

Morphologically the subfamily is characterised by having 6 tepals and 6 stamens with a superior ovary, a characteristic which placed them within the older order of Liliales in many older classification systems, such as the Cronquist system, but they now separate from them within the Asparagales order. They have also been included in the family Liliaceae.

Roots: contractile and mucilaginous.

Leaves: fleshy and mucilaginous arranged in a basal rosette, alternate and spiral, simple, margin entire, with parallel venation, sheathing at the base, without stipules and hair simple.

Flowers: arranged in scapiflorous inflorescences (in racemes, in spikes, and in heads). The peduncles are articulated. The flowers are hermaphroditic, actinomorphic, often showy.

Perianths: six tepals divided into two whorls, free or joined (connate). When joined, the perianth forms a tubular bell. The tepals are imbricate and petaloid. The corolla may be white, yellow, violet, blue, brown and even black

Androecium: composed of 6 stamens (exceptionally 3, as in Albuca, for example), with the filaments free or adnate to the tube, often appendiculate. The anthers are dorsifixed and pollen dehiscence occurs by longitudinal openings. The pollen is monosulcate (having a linear furrow).

Gynoecium: superior ovary, tricarpelate, connate and trilocular. Single stigma, capitate to 3-lobed. May contain from one to several ovules in each locule. They have nectaries at the septa of the ovaries.

Fruit: dehiscence loculicidal.

Seed: Seed morphology is diverse, from globular to flattened, and occasionally aril. The seed coat usually contains phytomelan (phytomelanin), one of the defining characteristics of the order, a black pigment present in the seed coat, creating a dark crust.

Chromosomes: Chromosome size varies widely, from 1.2 to 18 μm in length, karyotype bimodal or trimodal. The basic chromosome number is also very variable (X = 2, 6, 7, 10, 15, 17, etc.).

== Systematics ==
When treated as a subfamily, the name Scilloideae is derived from the generic name of the type genus, Scilla, and is attributed to Gilbert Thomas Burnett in 1835. When treated as a family, the name Hyacinthaceae is derived from the type genus Hyacinthus, and is usually attributed to August Batsch from ("ex") a 1797 publication by Moritz Borkhausen.

=== Phylogeny ===
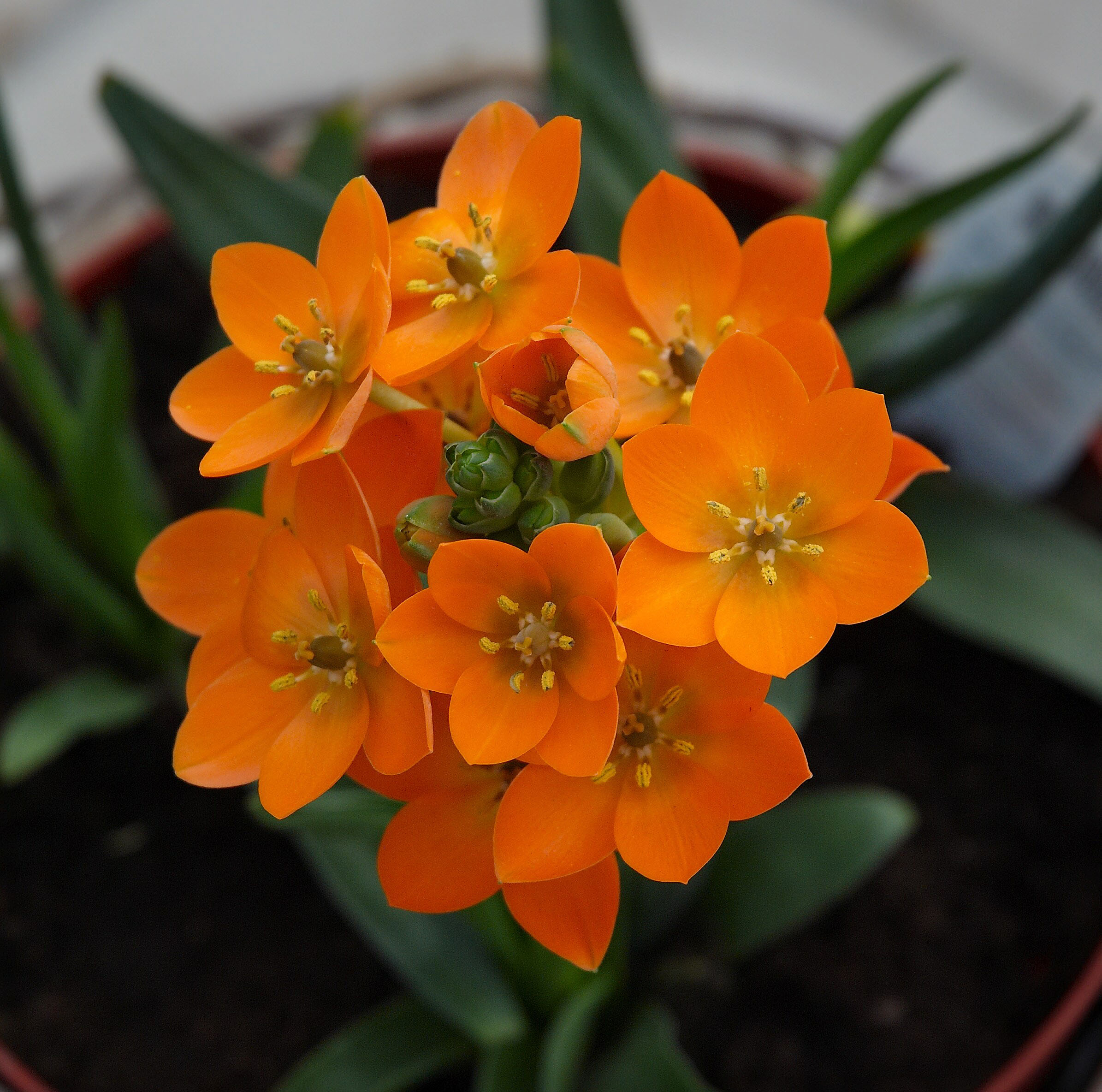
Ornithogalum dubium

The monophyly of Scilloideae is well supported by studies based on molecular data. These studies also give support to the exclusion of Camassia, Chlorogalum and related genera, i.e. the former Hyacinthaceae subfamily Chlorogaloideae, now placed in the subfamily Agavoideae.

The exact position of the Scilloideae within the broadly defined Asparagaceae is less clear. One possible phylogeny for the seven subfamilies recognised within the family is shown below.

- Asparagaceae
  - - Aphyllanthoideae
    - - Agavoideae
      - - Brodiaeoideae
        - Scilloideae
  - - Lomandroideae
    - - Asparagoideae
      - Convallarioideae

Although generally agreeing on the main division of the Asparagaceae into two clades, studies have produced slightly different relationships among the Agavoideae, Aphyllanthoideae, Brodiaeoideae and Scilloideae. For example, Seberg et al. (2012) present analyses based on parsimony and on maximum likelihood. In the first, the Scilloideae are sister to the Agavoideae; in the second, they are sister to the Brodiaeoideae.

=== Early classifications ===
Detailed historical accounts of taxonomic issues relating to the modern subfamily Scilloideae have been provided by Pfosser & Speta (1999) and Chase et al. (2009). The lilioid monocots have long created classification problems. At one extreme, e.g. in the Cronquist system of 1968, they have been regarded as one large family (Liliaceae sensu lato). At the other extreme, e.g. in the Dahlgren system of 1985, they have been divided between orders and split into many often small families. Dahlgren divided the lilioid monocots in search of monophyly, but in practice he was unsuccessful. His major contribution was to split the Liliaceae into two families, the true Liliaceae, Liliaceae sensu stricto, and the Hyacinthaceae (families which are now placed in separate orders, Liliales and Asparagales).

Splitting off the Hyacinthaceae from the Liliaceae was originally suggested by Batsch in 1786. Batsch's version of the family only superficially resembles the modern version, but did include Hyacinthus and Lachenalia. The group was reduced to a tribe by Endlicher in 1836, and included Camassia. In 1866 Salisbury redistributed the genera into several families. In the 1870s, Baker used tribes to divide up the Liliaceae s.l.. introducing the Hyacintheae, Scilleae, Massonieae, and Chlorogaleae. In 1887 Engler divided the Liliaceae s.l. into two tribes, Lilieaoe and Scilleae. In the twentieth century, Fritsch proposed the division of Liliaceae s.l. into smaller more homogeneous families. In the 1930s the Viennese school elevated Engler's tribes to subfamilies. They questioned the inclusion of such different groups as Lilioideae and Scilloideae within the same family, and even Scilloideae was considered to be composed of at least three groups. By 1969, Huber was recognizing the Scilloideae as the family Hyacinthaceae, and dividing it into tribes. How many tribes were recognised and how the genera were distributed within those tribes depended on the diagnostic characters chosen. Huber used seeds, while Schulze in 1980 used pollen. Morphology and chromosome analysis were supplemented by chemotaxonomy, due to the presence of cardiac steroids, such as the bufadienolids in the Urgineoideae and cardenolids in Ornithogaloideae. Even Linnaean genera such as Hyacinthus, Scilla and Ornithoglum proved heterogeneous and characters useful in other families failed to define satisfactory taxa.

=== Modern classifications ===
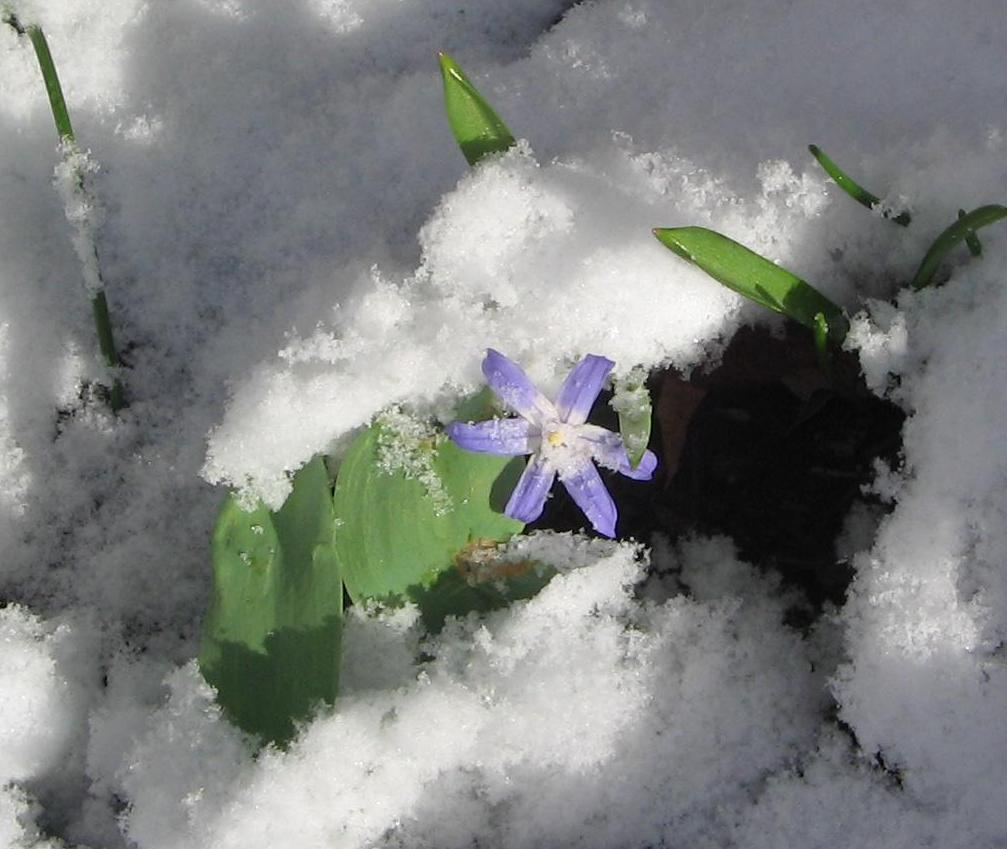
Chionodoxa luciliae, glory-of-the-snow

Modern classification systems for plants are largely derived from molecular phylogenetic analysis. The initial molecular analysis of the Liliaceae s.l. was based on the Dahlgren system, as for example in the work by Chase et al. in 1995. When it was discovered that the Dahlgren families were not monophyletic, the tendency was to create new families out of each identified clade, as in the first Angiosperm Phylogeny Group system of 1998, the APG system. This placed many lilioid families and genera in the order Asparagales (a term derived from Dahlgren, and the largest monocot order). One of the 29 families into which the Asparagales were divided was the Hyacinthaceae.

With further work it was evident that these 29 families, some of which had few genera, could be grouped into larger clades. The APG II system of 2003 was a compromise. It divided the Asparagales into 14 broadly defined families, while allowing an alternative system in which some of the larger families could be replaced by smaller ones. The Hyacinthaceae was one of these optional smaller families, which could alternatively be sunk into a broadly defined Asparagaceae.

This compromise approach was abandoned in the APG III system of 2009, which allowed only the broader families. The paper presenting the system states "The area around Asparagaceae is difficult from the standpoint of circumscription. Although Asparagaceae s.l. are heterogeneous and poorly characterized, Asparagaceae s.s., Agavaceae, Laxmanniaceae, Ruscaceae and even Hyacinthaceae have few if any distinctive features." At the same time, Chase et al. provided subfamilies to replace the alternative narrowly defined families of APG II. The Hyacinthaceae became the subfamily Scilloideae of the family Asparagaceae.

Many sources have adopted the APG III system; for example, the World Checklist of Selected Plant Families places genera such as Hyacinthus only in the broadly defined Asparagaceae. Other sources prefer to retain the narrower families of APG II; for example, Seberg et al. say that it "remains a moot point whether the difficult-to-recognize bracketed families of APG II are a worse or a better choice than the equally difficult-to-recognize subfamilies of APG III", and in their analyses of the phylogeny of the Asparagales they continue to use families such as Hyacinthaceae.

=== Tribes ===
In 1990, Pfosser and Speta stated that their earlier classification of the Hyacinthaceae into the subfamilies Hyacinthoideae, Ornithogaloideae, Oziroeoideae and Urgineoideae continued to be supported by ongoing studies. (They further divided the subfamilies Hyacinthoideae and Ornithogaloideae into tribes.) A part of reducing the Hyacinthaceae to the subfamily Scilloideae, Chase et al. (2009) suggested dividing it into four tribes, corresponding to Pfosser and Speta's four subfamilies: Hyacintheae Dumort., Ornithogaleae Rouy, Oziroëeae M.W.Chase, Reveal & M.F.Fay and Urgineeae Rouy. Hyacintheae was further divided into three subtribes: Pseudoprosperinae, Massoniinae and Hyacinthinae. The possible relationship of the tribes and subtribes is illustrated in the following cladogram, which has, however, only "moderate" statistical support.

- Scilloideae
  - Oziroëeae
  - - Ornithogaleae
    - - Urgineeae
      - - Hyacintheae
          - Pseudoprosperinae
          - - Massoniinae
            - Hyacinthinae

The exact boundaries between genera within these tribes remains controversial; the situation has been described as being in a "state of flux".

==== Oziroëeae ====
Species are found only in western South America. They have flowers with stamens which are joined to the petals, rounded seeds and the embryo as long as the seed. The basic chromosome numbers are n = 15, 17. The tribe contains only the genus Oziroë.

==== Ornithogaleae ====
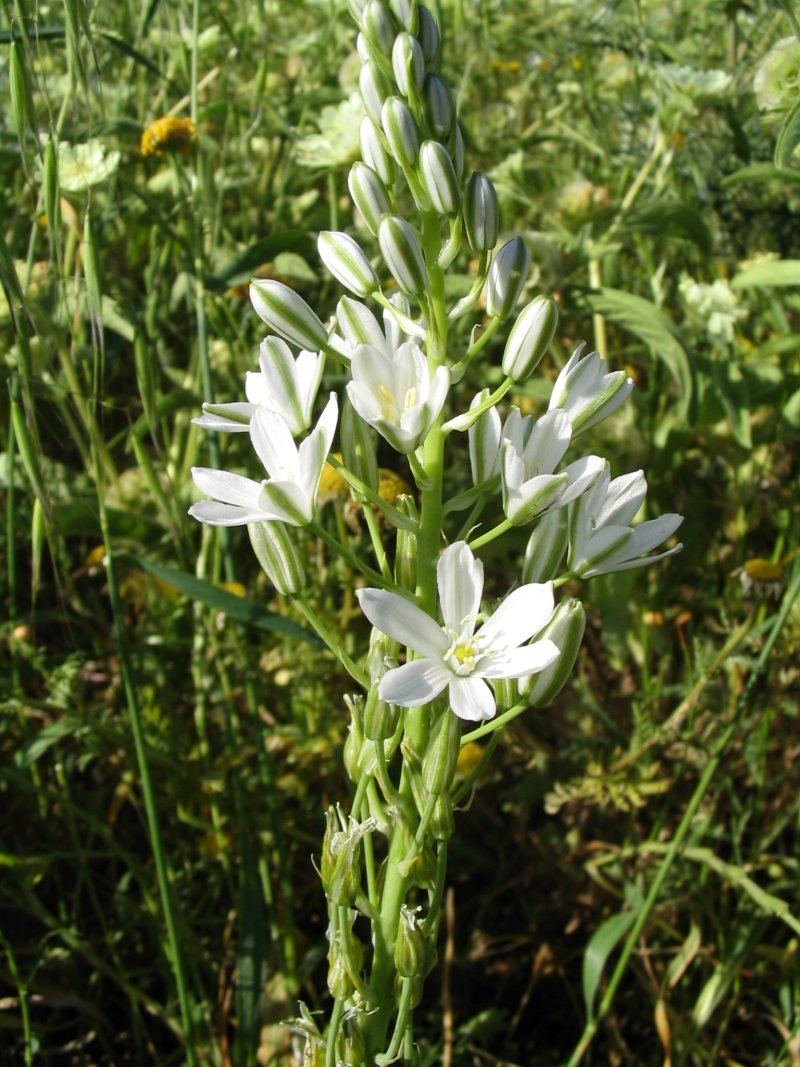
Ornithogalum narbonense

In terms of the number of species, this is the second largest tribe. Its species are distributed in Europe, western Asia and Africa. They have flowers with three stamens which have flattened filaments. Their seeds are flattened and angular. The basic chromosome numbers range from n = 2 to n = 10. In the treatment by Manning et al. (2009) and Stevens at the Angiosperm Phylogeny Website, the tribe contains four genera, Albuca (about 110–140 species), Dipcadi, Ornithogalum (about 160 species, including Galtonia and Neopatersonia) and Pseudogaltonia. By contrast, Martínez-Azorín et al. (2011) divide the tribe into 19 genera.

==== Urgineeae ====
Species within this tribe contain bufadienolides and are distributed mainly in Africa, Madagascar, and the Mediterranean through to India. The seeds are flattened and winged with the head barely attached to the endosperm. The basic chromosome numbers are n = 6, 7 and 10. Depending on the source, the tribe may include the genera Bowiea, Drimia (including Urginea), Schizobasis (sometimes included in Drimia) and Fusifilum (also sometimes included in Drimia).

==== Hyacintheae ====
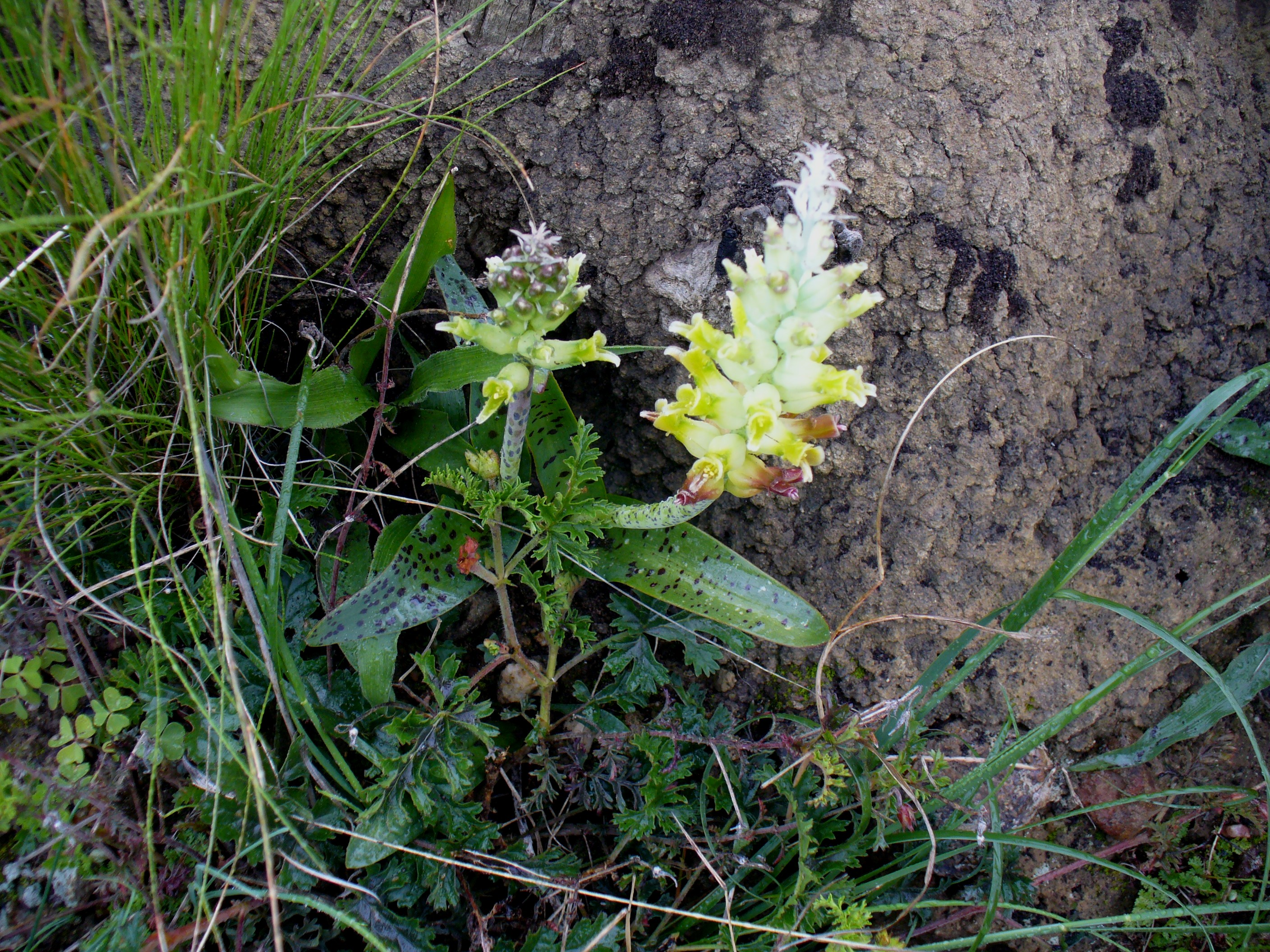
Lachenalia orchioides

In terms of the number of species, this is the largest tribe. Its species have leaves with pustules or spots, rounded seeds and contain homoisoflavanones. The tribe can in turn be divided into three subtribes:

- Pseudoprosperinae Speta

A monotypic subtribe genus with a single species, Pseudoprospero firmifolium, is from eastern South Africa. It has two ovules per carpel with one seed per locule and a basic chromosome number n = 9.

- Massoniinae Bentham & Hooker f.

Species are distributed in Africa south of the Sahara and India. There are two or more ovules per carpel. The seeds have elaiosomes. The basic chromosome number is 5 to 10+ (many 20). The subtribe contains about 13–20 genera (depending on the treatment), including Daubenya, Drimiopsis, Eucomis, Lachenalia (about 110 species), Ledebouria (about 80 species), Massonia (including Whiteheadia), Merwilla, Schizocarphus and Veltheimia.

- Hyacinthinae Parlatore

Species are distributed in Europe, the Mediterranean and North Africa and the Middle East, and then again in the Far East. There are two to eight ovules per carpel; elaiosomes are present in the seeds; and the basic chromosome number is 4 to 8+. The subtribe contains about 14–25 genera (depending on the treatment), including Bellevalia (about 50 species), Brimeura, Hyacinthoides, Muscari (about 50 species), Scilla (about 30 species) and Prospero (about 25 species).

=== Genera and species ===
Some genera that were formerly placed within the Scillioideae (as Hyacinthaceae), e.g., Chlorogalum and Camassia, are currently placed in the Agavoideae.

Both historically and as of March 2013, there has been "considerable disagreement over generic limits" in the remaining Scilloideae, with different sources listing from 15 to 45 genera for sub-Saharan Africa alone. The total number of genera has been given as anything between about 30 (with about 500–700 species) and 70 (with about 1000 species).

==== List of genera ====
Unless otherwise noted, the list below is based on genera accepted by the World Checklist of Selected Plant Families as in the family Asparagaceae (with synonyms from the same source), with assignments to the subfamily Scilloideae based on the Germplasm Resources Information Network. As noted above, other sources divide up some of these genera, creating a significantly larger number; thus the genus Ornithogalum as conceived by Manning et al. (2009) is divided by Martínez-Azorín et al. (2011) into a more narrowly circumscribed Ornithogalum plus an additional 11 genera.

- Albuca L. (including Battandiera Maire, Coilonox Raf., Stellarioides Medik., Trimelopter Raf.; sometimes included in Ornithogalum)
- Alrawia (Wendelbo) Perss. & Wendelbo
- Austronea Martinez-Azorín et al.
- Barnardia Lindl.
- Bellevalia Lapeyr. (including Strangweja Bertol.)
- Bowiea Harv. ex Hook.f. (Climbing Onion, Sea Onion)
- Brimeura Salisb.
- Daubenya Lindl. (including Amphisiphon W.F.Barker, Androsiphon Schltr.)
- Dipcadi Medik. (sometimes included in Ornithogalum)
- Drimia Jacq. (including Litanthus Harv., Rhadamanthus Salisb., Rhodocodon Baker, Sypharissa Salisb., Tenicroa Raf., Thuranthos C.H.Wright, Urginea Steinh., Urgineopsis Compton)
- Drimiopsis Lindl. & Paxton (sometimes included in Ledebouria)
- Eucomis L'Hér.
- Fessia Speta (sometimes included in Scilla)
- Fusifilum Raf. (sometimes included in Drimia)
- Hyacinthella Schur
- Hyacinthoides Heist. ex Fabr. (including Endymion Dumort.)
- Hyacinthus Tourn. ex L.
- Lachenalia Jacq. ex Murray (including Brachyscypha Baker, Periboea Kunth, Polyxena Kunth)
- Ledebouria Roth
- Leopoldia Parl. (included in Muscari, e.g. as Muscari subg. Leopoldia)
- Massonia Thunb. ex Houtt. (including Neobakeria Schltr., Whiteheadia Harv.)
- Merwilla Speta
- Muscari Mill. (including Botryanthus Kunth, Muscarimia Kostel.)
- Namophila U.Müll.-Doblies & D.Müll.-Doblies
- Ornithogalum L. (including Avonsera Speta, Cathissa Salisb., Eliokarmos Raf., Elsiea F.M.Leight., Ethesia Raf., Galtonia Decne., Honorius Gray, Loncomelos Raf., Melomphis Raf., Neopatersonia Schönland, Nicipe Raf.)
- Oziroe Raf. (including Fortunatia J.F.Macbr.)
- Prospero Salisb.
- Pseudogaltonia (Kuntze) Engl. (sometimes included in Ornithogalum)
- Pseudomuscari Garbari & Greuter (sometimes included in Muscari)
- Pseudoprospero Speta
- Puschkinia Adams
- Resnova van der Merwe
- Schizobasis Baker (sometimes included in Drimia)
- Schizocarphus van der Merwe
- Scilla L. (including Autonoe, Chionodoxa Boiss., Chouardia, Nectaroscilla, Oncostema)
- Spetaea Wetschnig & Pfosser
- Veltheimia Gled.
- Zagrosia Speta (sometimes included in Scilla)
- Zingela N.R.Crouch, Mart.-Azorín, M.B.Crespo, M.Pinter & M.Á.Alonso

== Distribution and ecology ==
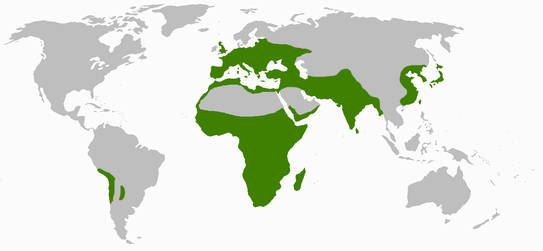
Distribution of Scilloideae species

Scilloideae are widely but discontinuously distributed. The genus Oziroe is found only in parts of western South America. Other genera occur in Africa south of the Sahara and parts of the Arabian Peninsula, on both sides of the Mediterranean, further north in Europe through the Middle East to India, and on the east coast of Asia, in China, Korea and Japan. Scilloideae are found in temperate to tropical habitats, but are more diverse in areas of Mediterranean climate (i.e., with a pronounced dry season during the summer).

Scilloideae reproduce both sexually and asexually. The showy flowers of many species of the subfamily are pollinated by a wide range of insects including bees, wasps, flies and moths, as well as birds. Both nectar and pollen act as incentives to pollinating species. Vegetative reproduction may be by bulbils or by seeds through apomixis. The dispersal of seeds may occur by water, wind, or by ants attracted by elaiosomes.

== Uses ==
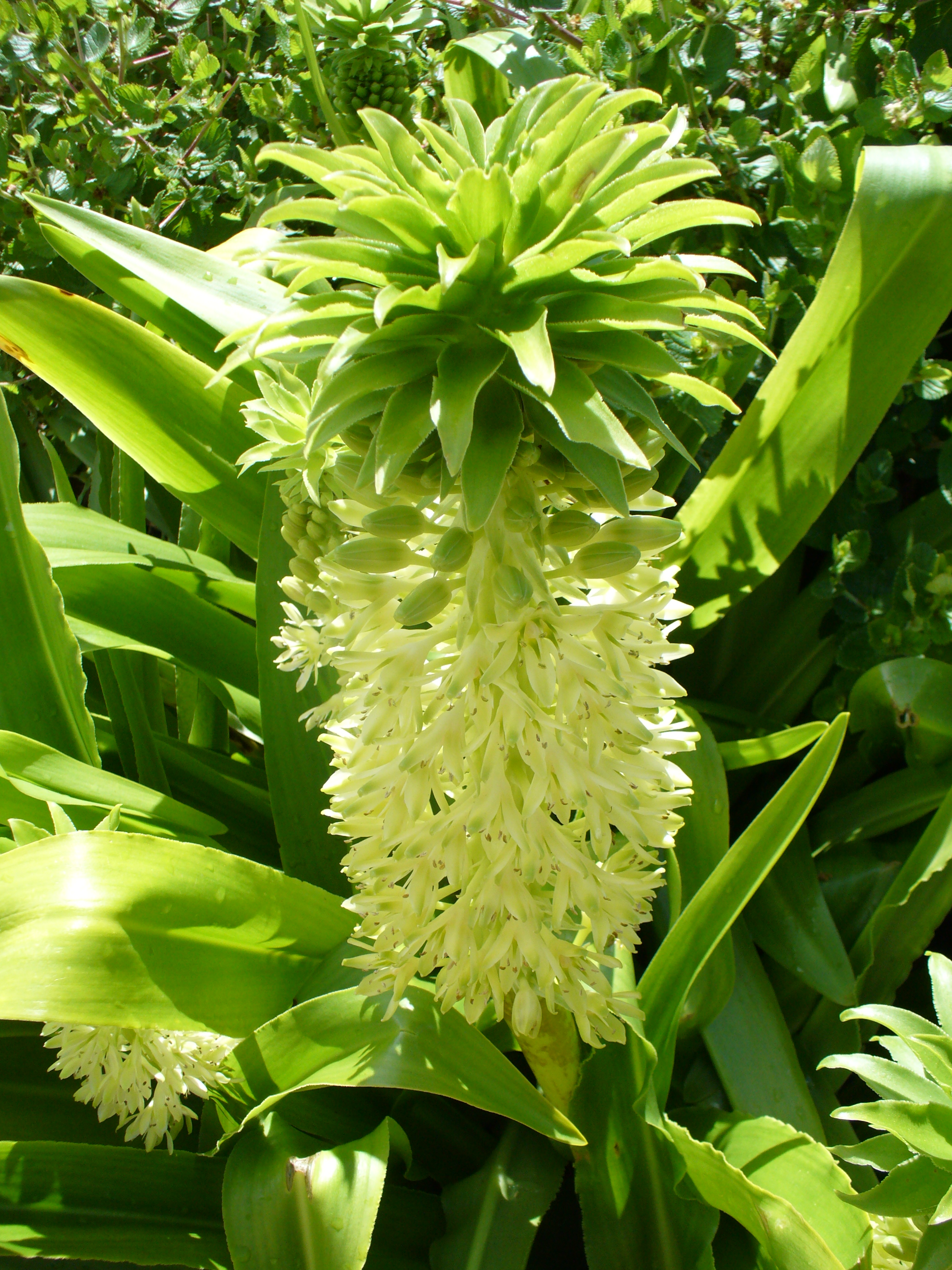
Eucomis autumnalis

=== Horticultural use ===
Many genera belonging to this subfamily are grown in flower gardens, such as Hyacinthus, Muscari, Scilla, Eucomis, Puschkinia, Veltheimia, Hyacinthoides, and Ornithogalum (including those formerly placed in Galtonia).

Ornithogalum thyrsoides and the different cultivars of Hyacinthus orientalis are important in the cut flower market.

=== Medicinal use ===
Drimia maritima, the sea squill, has been used as a medicinal plant since ancient times. Its use for treatment of edema is mentioned in a papyrus from 1554 BC, the Middle Kingdom of Egypt. Bufadienolides isolated from Drimia maritima and Drimia indica are used for the production of substances for the treatment of heart conditions.

=== Pesticidal use ===
Dried chips of Drimia maritima bulbs are sometimes used to poison rats.

=== Culinary use ===
The Scilloideae are only occasionally used as food plants for humans. In Italy the bulbs of Muscari comosum are grown for food and in Greece they are consumed as pickles. In France the inflorescence of Ornithogalum pyrenaicum is consumed as a vegetable. In Africa some tribes consume the bulbs of Ledebouria apertiflora and Ledebouria revoluta.

== Toxicity ==
Several species (e.g Drimia maritima) produce toxic cardiac glycosides such as scilliroside.

In South Africa, for example, Ornithogalum thyrsoides, and several Ledebouria species (Ledebouria cooperi, L. inguinata, L. ovatifolia, L. revoluta), Ornithogalum saundersiae and several members of the tribe Urgineeae are poisonous to livestock.

== Bibliography ==
- Mabberley, D. (1997). The Plant-Book. Cambridge, United Kingdom: Cambridge University Press.
- Judd, W.S.; Campbell, C.S.; Kellogg, E.A.; Stevens, P.F.; Donoghue, M.J. (2007). "Hyacinthaceae". Plant Systematics: A Phylogenetic Approach (3rd ed.). Sunderland, Massachusetts: Sinauer Associates. pp. 269–270. ISBN 978-0-87893-407-2.
- Speta, Franz (1998). "Hyacintheae". In Kubitzki, Klaus; Huber, Herbert (eds.). Flowering plants. Monocotyledons: Lilianae (except Orchidaceae). The families and genera of vascular plants. Vol. 3. Berlin: Springer-Verlag. pp. 261–285. ISBN 3-540-64060-6.
- Martínez-Azorín, Mario; Crespo, Manuel B.; Dold, Anthony P.; Pinter, Michael; Wetschnig, Wolfgang (27 February 2015). "New combinations and lectotype designations in Asparagaceae subfam. Scilloideae". Phytotaxa. 201 (2): 165. Bibcode:2015Phytx.201..165M. doi:10.11646/phytotaxa.201.2.7.
- Stedje, Brita (2001). "Generic Delimitation of Hyacinthaceae, with Special Emphasis on Sub-Saharan Genera". Systematics and Geography of Plants. 71 (2): 449–454. doi:10.2307/3668693. JSTOR 3668693.
