= World Checklist of Selected Plant Families =

Plant database

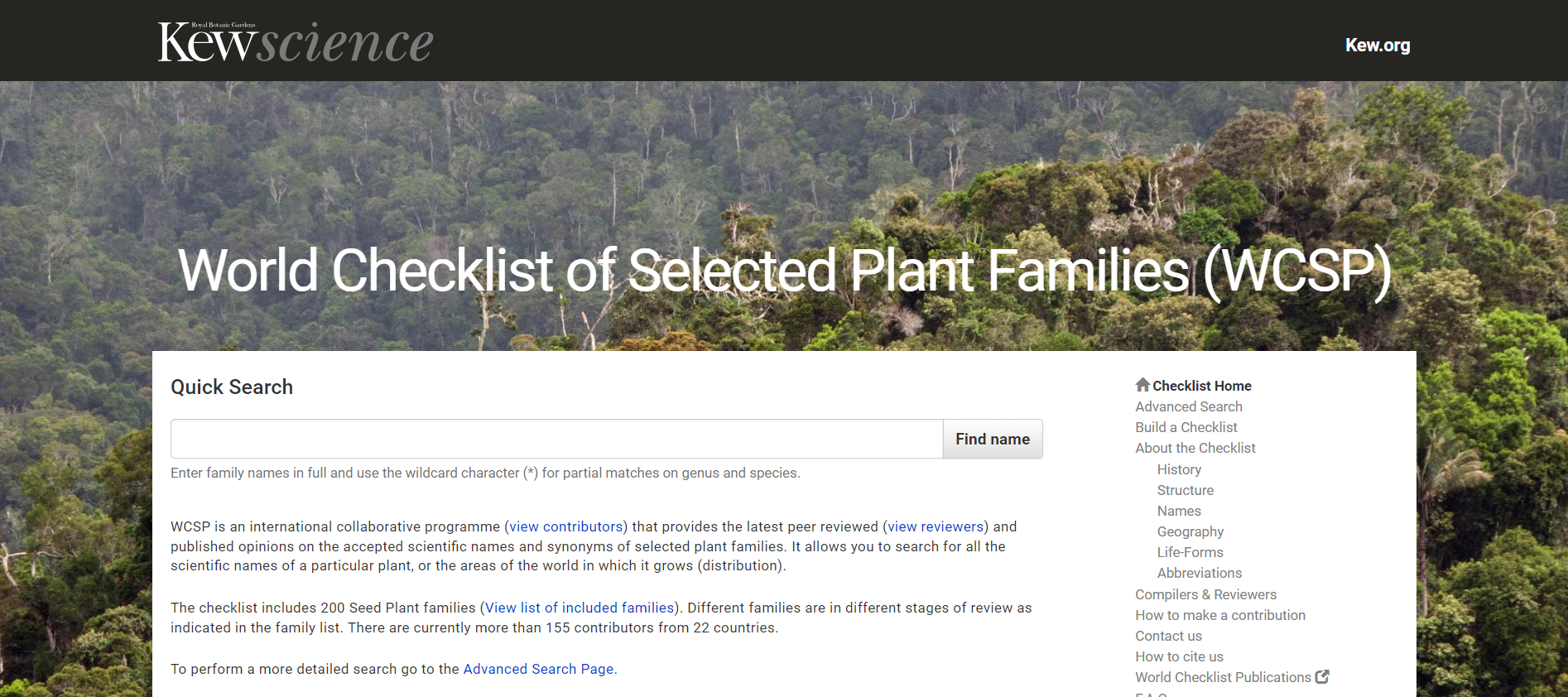
WCSP website page

The World Checklist of Selected Plant Families (usually abbreviated to WCSP) was an "international collaborative programme that provides the latest peer reviewed and published opinions on the accepted scientific names and synonyms of selected plant families." Maintained by the Royal Botanic Gardens, Kew, it was available online, allowing searches for the names of families, genera and species, as well as the ability to create checklists.

== History ==
The project traced its history to work done in the 1990s by Kew researcher Rafaël Govaerts on a checklist of the genus Quercus. Influenced by the Global Strategy for Plant Conservation, the project expanded. As of January 2013, 173 families of seed plants were included. Coverage of monocotyledon families was completed and other families were being added.

At the end of October 2022, the WCSP website, together with the World Checklist of Vascular Plants (WCVP) website, was closed and the data was transferred to the Plants of the World Online (POWO) database.

== Similar projects ==
There is a complementary project called the International Plant Names Index (IPNI), in which Kew is also involved. The IPNI aims to provide details of publication and does not aim to determine which are accepted species names. After a delay of about a year, newly published names were automatically added from the IPNI to the WCSP. The WCSP was also one of the underlying databases for The Plant List, created by Kew and the Missouri Botanical Garden, which was unveiled in 2010, and subsequently superseded by World Flora Online.

== See also ==
- Australian Plant Name Index
- Convention on Biological Diversity
- Plants of the World Online
- The Plant List
- Tropicos
- Wikispecies
