= List of endemic plants of Crete =

Crete and adjacent islands (Karpathos, Kasos, Saria, and smaller islets) are home to several dozen endemic species and subspecies of plants, together with two endemic genera, Horstrissea and Petromarula.

The World Geographical Scheme for Recording Plant Distributions treats Crete and associated islands as a separate botanical country from Greece and the East Aegean Islands, although all three are politically part of the same country.

Plants are listed alphabetically by plant family.

== Amaryllidaceae ==
- Allium bourgeaui subsp. creticum Bothmer
- Allium circinnatum subsp. circinnatum
- Allium dilatatum Zahar.
- Allium platakisii Tzanoud. & Kypr.
- Allium tardans Greuter & Zahar.
- Sternbergia lutea subsp. greuteriana (Kamari & R.Artelari) Strid

== Apiaceae ==
- Bupleurum gaudianum Snogerup
- Bupleurum kakiskalae Greuter
- Chaerophyllum creticum Boiss. & Heldr.
- Chrysophae cretica Koso-Pol.
- Eryngium ternatum Poir.
- Ferula thyrsiflora Sm.
- Ferulago thyrsiflora (Sm.) W.D.J.Koch
- Geocaryum creticum (Boiss. & Heldr.) Engstrand
- Horstrissea Greuter – endemic genus
  - Horstrissea dolinicola Greuter, Gerstb. & Egli

== Apocynaceae ==
- Vincetoxicum creticum Browicz

== Araceae ==
- Arum idaeum Coustur. & Gand.
- Arum purpureospathum P.C.Boyce
- Biarum davisii Turrill
- Biarum tenuifolium subsp. idomenaeum P.C.Boyce & Athanasiou

== Aristolochiaceae ==
- Aristolochia cretica Lam.
- Bellevalia brevipedicellata Turrill
- Bellevalia juliana Bareka, Turland & Kamari
- Bellevalia sitiaca Kypriotakis & Tzanoud.

== Asparagaceae ==
- Muscari spreitzenhoferi (Heldr.) Vierh.
- Ornithogalum creticum Zahar.
- Ornithogalum insulare Kypr.
- Prospero battagliae Speta
- Prospero depressum Speta
- Prospero hierapytnense Speta
- Prospero idaeum Speta
- Prospero minimum Speta
- Prospero rhadamanthi Speta
- Prospero talosii (Tzanoud. & Kypr.) Speta
- Scilla cretica (Boiss. & Heldr.) Speta
- Scilla cydonia Speta
- Scilla nana (Schult. & Schult.f.) Speta

== Aspleniaceae ==
- Asplenium creticum Lovis
- Asplenium × khaniense Brownsey & Jermy (A. creticum × A. trichomanes subsp. quadrivalens)

== Asteraceae ==
- Anthemis abrotanifolia (Willd.) Guss.
  - Anthemis abrotanifolia f. abrotanifolia
  - Anthemis abrotanifolia f. ligulata Greuter, Matthäs & Risse
- Anthemis ammanthus subsp. paleacea Greuter – Kárpathos (incl. Saria I.)
- Anthemis chia f. inornata Greuter, Matthäs & Risse
- Anthemis filicaulis (Boiss. & Heldr.) Greuter
- Anthemis glaberrima (Rech.f.) Greuter
- Anthemis pasiphaes Goula & Constantin
- Anthemis rigida subsp. antri-neptuni Goula & Constantin
- Anthemis samariensis Turland
- Anthemis tomentella Greuter
- Bellis longifolia Boiss. & Heldr
- Carlina barnebiana B.L.Burtt & P.H.Davis
- Carlina curetum subsp. curetum
- Carlina diae (Rech.f.) Meusel & A.Kástner
- Carlina sitiensis Rech.f.
- Carthamus rechingeri P.H.Davis – Kárpathos
- Centaurea argentea subsp. chionantha (Turland & L.Chilton) Greuter
- Centaurea argentea subsp. macrothysana (Rech.f.) Turland & L.Chilton
- Centaurea baldaccii Degen
- Centaurea idaea Boiss. & Heldr
- Centaurea lancifolia Sieber ex Spreng.
- Centaurea poculatoris Greuter
- Centaurea redempta subsp. redempta
- Crepis auriculifolia Sieber
- Crepis bellidifolia Noë ex Nyman
- Crepis fraasii subsp. mungieri (Boiss. & Heldr.) P.D.Sell
- Crepis neglecta subsp. cretica (Boiss.) Vierh.
- Crepis sibthorpiana Boiss. & Heldr.
- Crepis tybakiensis Vierh.
  - Crepis tybakiensis var. flexiscapa (Rech.f.) Greuter
  - Crepis tybakiensis var. tybakiensis
- Filago wagenitziana Bergmeier
- Helichrysum doerfleri Rech.f.
- Helichrysum heldreichii Boiss.
- Hieracium schmidtii subsp. creticum (Zahn) Greuter
- Hypochaeris tenuiflora (Boiss.) Boiss.
- Lactuca alpestris (Gand.) Rech.f.
- Lophiolepis morinifolia (Boiss. & Heldr.) Del Guacchio, Bureš, Iamonico & P.Caputo
- Onopordum bracteatum subsp. creticum Franco
- Phagnalon pygmaeum (Sieber) Greuter
- Pseudopodospermum idaeum (Gand.) Zaika
- Ptilostemon chamaepeuce var. elegans Greuter
- Senecio fruticulosus Sm.
- Staehelina petiolata (L.) Hilliard & B.L.Burtt
- Tragopogon lassithicus Rech.f.

== Boraginaceae ==
- Alkanna sieberi A.DC.
- Cynoglossum sphacioticum Boiss. & Heldr.
- Myosotis solange Greuter & Zaffran

== Brassicaceae ==
- Alyssum idaeum Boiss. & Heldr
- Alyssum lassiticum Halácsy
- Alyssum sphacioticum Boiss. & Heldr.
- Arabis cretica Boiss. & Heldr.
- Draba cretica Boiss. & Heldr.
- Erysimum candicum Snogerup
  - Erysimum candicum subsp. candicum
  - Erysimum candicum subsp. carpathum Snogerup
- Erysimum creticum Boiss. & Heldr.
- Erysimum mutabile Boiss. & Heldr.
- Erysimum raulinii Boiss.
- Noccaea cretica (Degen & Jáv.) F.K.Mey.
- Noccaea zaffranii F.K.Mey.
- Odontarrhena baldaccii (Vierh. ex Nyár.) Španiel
- Odontarrhena fragillima (Bald.) Španiel
- Ricotia cretica Boiss. & Heldr.
- Ricotia isatoides (Barbey) B.L.Burtt

== Campanulaceae ==
- Campanula aizoides Zaffran
- Campanula carpatha Halácsy – Kárpathos, Kasos, Saria.
- Campanula cretica (A.DC.) D.Dietr.
- Campanula creutzburgii Greuter
- Campanula dimitrii Strid – Kárpathos
- Campanula hierapetrae Rech.f.
- Campanula jacquinii (Sieber) A.DC.
- Campanula pelviformis Lam.
- Campanula pinatzii Greuter & Phitos
- Campanula saxatilis subsp. saxatilis
- Campanula spatulata subsp. filicaulis (Halácsy) Phitos
- Campanula tubulosa Lam.
- Petromarula Vent. ex R.Hedw.
  - Petromarula pinnata (L.) A.DC.

== Caprifoliaceae ==
- Lomelosia albocincta (Greuter) Greuter & Burdet
- Lomelosia minoana (P.H.Davis) Greuter & Burdet
  - Lomelosia minoana subsp. asterusica (Greuter) Greuter & Burdet
  - Lomelosia minoana subsp. minoana
- Lomelosia sphaciotica (Roem. & Schult.) Greuter & Burdet
  - Lomelosia sphaciotica subsp. decalvans (Halácsy) Bergmeier
  - Lomelosia sphaciotica subsp. sphaciotica
- Valeriana sieberi (Heldr.) Christenh. & Byng

== Caryophyllaceae ==
- Bolanthus creutzburgii Greuter
- Bufonia stricta subsp. cecconiana (Bald.) Rech.f.
- Cerastium brachypetalum subsp. doerfleri (Halácsy ex Hayek) P.D.Sell & Whitehead
- Cerastium deschatresii Greuter
- Cerastium scaposum Boiss. & Heldr.
  - Cerastium scaposum subsp. peninsularum Greuter, N.Böhling & Ralf Jahn
  - Cerastium scaposum subsp. scaposum
- Cherleria wettsteinii (Mattf.) A.J.Moore & Dillenb.
- Dianthus candicus (P.W.Ball & Heywood) Madhani & Heubl
- Dianthus fruticosus subsp. carpathus Runemark
- Dianthus fruticosus subsp. creticus (Tausch) Runemark
- Dianthus fruticosus subsp. sitiacus Runemark
- Dianthus juniperinus subsp. aciphyllus (Sieber ex Ser.) Turland
- Dianthus juniperinus subsp. bauhinorum (Greuter) Turland
- Dianthus juniperinus subsp. heldreichii Greuter
- Dianthus juniperinus subsp. idaeus Turland
- Dianthus juniperinus subsp. kavusicus Turland
- Dianthus juniperinus subsp. pulviniformis (Greuter) Turland
- Dianthus sphacioticus Boiss. & Heldr.
- Dianthus xylorrhizus Boiss. & Heldr.
- Petrorhagia dianthoides (Sm.) P.W.Ball & Heywood
- Silene ammophila Boiss. & Heldr.
  - Silene ammophila subsp. ammophila
  - Silene ammophila subsp. carpathae Chowdhuri – Kárpathos
- Silene antri-jovis Greuter & Burdet
- Silene flavescens subsp. dictaea (Rech.f.) Greuter
- Silene insularis Barbey – Kárpathos
- Silene integripetala subsp. greuteri (Phitos) Akeroyd
- Silene pinetorum Boiss. & Heldr
  - Silene pinetorum subsp. pinetorum
  - Silene pinetorum subsp. sphaciotica Oxelman & Greuter
- Silene sieberi Fenzl
- Silene variegata (Desf.) Boiss. & Heldr
- Telephium imperati subsp. pauciflorum (Greuter) Greuter & Burdet

== Colchicaceae ==
- Colchicum cretense Greuter

== Convolvulaceae ==
- Convolvulus argyrothamnos Greuter
- Cuscuta atrans Feinbrun

== Crassulaceae ==
- Sedum creticum subsp. creticum – Crete and Kárpathos
- Sedum eriocarpum subsp. spathulifolium 't Hart
- Sedum litoreum var. creticum 't Hart
- Sedum praesidis Runemark & Greuter

== Cyperaceae ==
- Carex idaea Greuter, Matthäs & Risse

== Euphorbiaceae ==
- Euphorbia myrsinites subsp. rechingeri (Greuter) Aldén
- Euphorbia sultan-hassei Strid, B.Bentzer, Bothmer, Engstrand & M.A.Gust.

== Fabaceae ==
- Astragalus angustifolius subsp. echinoides (L'Hér.) Brullo, Giusso & Musarella
- Astragalus creticus Lam.
  - Astragalus creticus subsp. creticus
  - Astragalus creticus subsp. minoicus Brullo & Giusso
- Astragalus dolinicola (Brullo & Giusso) Brullo & Giusso
- Astragalus idaeus Bunge
- Astragalus nummularius subsp. nummularius
- Coronilla globosa Lam.
- Ebenus cretica L.
- Lathyrus neurolobus Boiss. & Heldr.
- Medicago arborea subsp. strasseri (Greuter, Matthäs & Risse) Sobr.-Vesp. & Ceresuela
- Onobrychis sphaciotica Greuter
- Ononis verae Širj.
- Trifolium phitosianum N.Böhling, Greuter & Raus

== Hypericaceae ==
- Hypericum aciferum (Greuter) N.Robson
- Hypericum amblycalyx Coustur. & Gand.
- Hypericum empetrifolium subsp. oliganthum (Rech.f.) I.Hagemanm
- Hypericum empetrifolium subsp. tortuosum (Rech.f.) I.Hagemann
- Hypericum jovis Greuter
- Hypericum kelleri Bald.
- Hypericum trichocaulon Boiss. & Heldr.

== Iridaceae ==
- Crocus oreocreticus B.L.Burtt
- Crocus pumilus (Rukšāns) Rukšāns
- Crocus ruksansii Zubov
- Crocus sieberi J.Gay

== Lamiaceae ==
- Clinopodium creticum (L.) Kuntze
- Micromeria carpatha Rech.f. – Kárpathos
- Micromeria hispida Boiss. & Heldr. ex Benth.
- Micromeria sphaciotica Boiss. & Heldr. ex Benth. – Kárpathos
- Nepeta sphaciotica P.H.Davis
- Origanum dictamnus L.
- Origanum × karpathicum Dirmenci, C.Catt. & Dimarchou (O. onites × O. vetteri) – Kárpathos
- Origanum microphyllum (Benth.) Vogel
- Origanum × minoanum P.H.Davis (O. microphyllum × O. vulgare subsp. hirtum)
- Origanum vetteri Briq. & Barbey
- Phlomis × commixta Rech.f., Denkschr
- Phlomis lanata Willd.
- Phlomis pichleri Vierh.
- Phlomis × sieberi Vierh.
- Phlomis × vierhapperi Rech.f.
- Prunella cretensis Gand.
- Scutellaria hirta Sm.
- Scutellaria sieberi Benth.
- Sideritis syriaca subsp. syriaca
- Stachys mucronata Sieber ex Spreng.
- Teucrium alpestre Sm.
- Teucrium cuneifolium Sm.
- Teucrium gracile Barbey & Fors.-Major
- Teucrium montbretii subsp. heliotropiifolium (Barbey) P.H.Davis
- Thymbra calostachya (Rech.f.) Rech.f.
- Thymus leucotrichus var. creticus (Bald.) Ronniger

== Liliaceae ==
- Fritillaria messanensis subsp. sphaciotica (Gand.) Kamari & Phitos
- Gagea omalensis J.-M.Tison
- Tulipa cretica Boiss. & Heldr.

== Linaceae ==
- Linum caespitosum Sm.
- Linum doerfleri Rech.f.

== Orchidaceae ==
- × Anacamptorchis salkowskiana (C.Alibertis & A.Alibertis) J.M.H.Shaw
- Cephalanthera cucullata Boiss. & Heldr.
- Ophrys × antiskariensis Soca (O. bombyliflora × O. cretica)
- Ophrys × baumanniana Soó (O. cretica × O. sphegodes)
- Ophrys × plorae C.Alibertis & A.Alibertis (O. cretica × O. spruneri)
- Ophrys × regis-minois Halx (O. cretica × O. scolopax subsp. heldreichii)
- Ophrys × vamvakiae Kohlmüller (O. cretica × O. lutea)
- Ophrys × varvarae Faller & Kreutz (O. cretica × O. fusca)
- × Orchinea hermaniana (C.Alibertis & A.Alibertis) J.M.H.Shaw (Neotinea tridentata × Orchis anatolica)
- Orchis sitiaca (Renz) P.Delforge
- Orchis spitzelii subsp. nitidifolia (W.P.Teschner) Soó
- Orchis × thriftiensis Renz (O. anatolica × O. pauciflora)
- Serapias × sitiae nothosubsp. sitiae (S. lingua × S. orientalis subsp. orientalis)
- Serapias × wettsteinii nothosubsp. wettsteinii (S. bergonii × S. orientalis subsp. orientalis)

== Paeoniaceae ==
- Paeonia clusii subsp. clusii – Crete and Kárpathos

== Papaveraceae ==
- Corydalis uniflora (Sieber) Nyman

== Plantaginaceae ==
- Chaenorhinum minus subsp. idaeum (Rech.f.) R.Fern.
- Veronica glauca subsp. kavusica (Rech.f.) M.A.Fisch.

== Plumbaginaceae ==
- Acantholimon androsaceum var. androsaceum
- Limonium calliopsium Alf.Mayer
- Limonium carpathum (Rech.f.) Rech.f. – Kárpathos (near Vrondi)
- Limonium cornarianum Kypr. & R.Artelari – southeast Crete
- Limonium creticum R.Artelari
- Limonium elaphonisicum Alf.Mayer
- Limonium frederici (Barbey) Rech.f.
- Limonium hierapetrae Rech.f.
- Limonium pigadiense (Rech.f.) Rech.f. – Kárpathos
- Limonium rigidum Alf.Mayer
- Limonium stenotatum (Rech.f.) Erben & Brullo
- Limonium vanandense Erben & Brullo – Kárpathos
- Limonium xerocamposicum Erben & Brullo

== Poaceae ==
- Brachypodium sylvaticum subsp. creticum H.Scholz & Greuter
- Catapodium borgesii H.Scholz
- Dactylis glomerata subsp. rigida (Boiss. & Heldr.) Hayek
- Festuca polita subsp. cretica (Markgr.-Dann.) Foggi & H.Scholz
- Sesleria doerfleri Hayek

== Polygonaceae ==
- Polygonum idaeum Hayek

== Primulaceae ==
- Cyclamen confusum (Grey-Wilson) Culham, Jope & P.Moore
- Cyclamen creticum (Dörfl.) Hildebr.
- Cyclamen graecum subsp. candicum Ietsw.
- Adonis cretica (Huth) Imam, Chrtek & A.Slavíková

== Ranunculaceae ==
- Anemone hortensis subsp. heldreichii (Boiss.) Rech.f. – Crete and Kárpathos
- Clematis elisabethae-carolae Greuter – Sfakia Prov.
- Nigella carpatha Strid – Kárpathos and Kasos
- Ranunculus cupreus Boiss. & Heldr.
- Ranunculus radinotrichus Greuter & Strid – western Crete (Levka Ori)
- Ranunculus veronicae N.Böhling

== Rosaceae ==
- Sanguisorba cretica Hayek

== Rubiaceae ==
- Cynanchica idaea (Halácsy) P.Caputo & Del Guacchio – mountains of Crete
- Galium citraceum Boiss. SC. & S. Greece to Kriti
- Galium extensum Krendl
- Galium fruticosum Willd.
- ''Galium incanum'' subsp. ''creticum'' Ehrend.
- Galium incrassatum Halácsy
- Galium incurvum Sm. – mountains of Crete
- Hexaphylla pubescens (Willd.) P.Caputo & Del Guacchio
- Thliphthisa crassula (Greuter & Zaffran) P.Caputo & Del Guacchio
- Thliphthisa rigida (Sm.) P.Caputo & Del Guacchio

== Salicaceae ==
- Salix kaptarae Cambria

== Santalaceae ==
- Viscum album subsp. creticum N.Böhling, Greuter, Raus, B.Snogerup, Snogerup & Zuber

== Scrophulariaceae ==
- Verbascum arcturus L.
- Verbascum × atchleyianum Rech.f. (V. sinuatum × V. spinosum)
- Verbascum × innominatum Rech.f. (V. macrurum × V. sinuatum)
- Verbascum spinosum L.

== Tamaricaceae ==
- Tamarix minoa J.L.Villar, Turland, Juan, Gaskin, M.A.Alonso & M.B.Crespo

== Ulmaceae ==
- Zelkova abelicea (Lam.) Boiss.

== Violaceae ==
- Viola alba subsp. cretica (Boiss. & Heldr.) Marcussen – mountains of Crete
