= Prospero idaeum =

Conservation status
- Data Deficient (IUCN 3.1)

Scientific classification
- Kingdom: Plantae
- Clade: Tracheophytes
- Clade: Angiosperms
- Clade: Monocots
- Order: Asparagales
- Family: Asparagaceae
- Subfamily: Scilloideae
- Genus: Prospero
- Species: P. idaeum

Binomial name
- Prospero idaeum Speta

Synonyms
- Scilla idaea (Speta) Valdés

Species of flowering plant

Prospero idaeum is an autumnal flowering plant of the family Asparagaceae, subfamily Scilloideae endemic to Crete, Greece. It is a diploid species in the Prospero autumnale cryptic species complex. This plant produces star-shaped pale pink blooms on slender stalks after its grass-like leaves emerge. Found only on Mount Ida in Crete at elevations around 1,400 metres, it was recognized as a distinct species in 2000 after careful study separated it from similar autumn squills.

== Description ==
The subterranean bulb is roughly spherical to broadly egg-shaped and about 2–3 cm across, wrapped in a rust-coloured tunic. In late summer it sends up a tuft of seven to fourteen narrow, grass-like leaves (2–7 mm wide, 11–15 cm long) that emerge before the flowers—a habit termed proteranthous. Shortly afterwards two or three slender, leafless flower stalks (scapes) rise 10–18 cm high, each carrying a loose raceme of seven to fifteen star-shaped, pale pink flowers. Individual blossoms measure about 3 mm long; the six petal-like segments (tepals) have a slightly deeper midrib, while the lilac-tinged ovary sits above slender, white-based stamens. Following pollination the pedicels extend and spherical seed capsules about 3 mm in diameter mature, releasing glossy black seeds.

== Taxonomy ==
Prospero idaeum was one of six autumn-flowering squills from Crete that the Austrian botanist Franz Speta segregated from the broad concept of Prospero autumnale when he reassessed the complex at the turn of the century. Morphological study, coupled with cytological evidence, convinced Speta that these Cretan plants warranted recognition in the resurrected genus Prospero—a group distinguished from Scilla sensu stricto by its rust-coloured bulb tunics, proteranthous (leaf-before-flower) growth, and small, funnel-shaped flowers. In his 2000 paper he formally named P. idaeum, designating a cultivated specimen raised from material collected on the Nida Plateau of Mount Ida (Psiloritis, 1,400 m elevation) as the holotype. The specific epithet honours the mountain massif that shelters the species' only known population. Chromosome counts showed a diploid complement of 2n=14, a number shared with two of its close congeners (P. rhadamanthi and P. depressum) but lower than the counts recorded for the polyploid P. hierapytnense (2n=26) and P. battagliae (2n=28).
