= Prospero minimum =

Conservation status
- Vulnerable (IUCN 3.1)

Scientific classification
- Kingdom: Plantae
- Clade: Tracheophytes
- Clade: Angiosperms
- Clade: Monocots
- Order: Asparagales
- Family: Asparagaceae
- Subfamily: Scilloideae
- Genus: Prospero
- Species: P. minimum

Binomial name
- Prospero minimum Speta

Synonyms
- Scilla minima (Speta) Valdés

Species of flowering plant

Prospero minimum is an autumnal flowering plant of the family Asparagaceae, subfamily Scilloideae that is endemic to Crete, Greece. It is a diploid species in the Prospero autumnale cryptic species complex. This tiny autumn-flowering plant is among the smallest members of the squill family, with thread-like leaves less than 1 mm wide and delicate pink star-shaped flowers. It grows on limestone rubble near Imbros Gorge and was recognized as a distinct species in 2000 when scientists documented its uniquely diminutive size compared to related plants.

== Description ==
The subspherical bulb, scarcely 1.8 cm long, is wrapped in a brown, papery tunic and gives rise to just a few roots. In late summer the plant produces extremely fine, grass-like leaves only 0.5–1 mm across and up to 10 cm long; because these leaves appear before the flowers the growth habit is called proteranthous. One or two wiry, leafless stems (scapes 4–10 cm tall then bear a loose spike (raceme) of three to ten star-shaped flowers. Each blossom measures about 5 mm across, with six petal-like segments (tepals) flushed pale pink and marked by a darker midrib; the violet filaments broaden towards their white bases, surrounding a tiny purple ovary topped by a slender style. After fertilisation the stalks elongate and almost spherical seed capsules about 2.5–3 mm in diameter mature, releasing glossy brown-black seeds roughly 1.5 mm long.

== Taxonomy ==
Austrian botanist Franz Speta formally described Prospero minimum in 2000 while revising the autumn-flowering squills of Crete. Earlier floras had subsumed these modest bulbs under a broad concept of Scilla autumnalis, but Speta's comparative work—combining detailed morphology with chromosome counts—showed that several Cretan lineages form a coherent group that differs from Scilla sensu stricto. He therefore reinstated the long-neglected genus Prospero and assigned six new species to it, of which P. minimum is the tiniest. The holotype derives from plants collected on limestone rubble near Imbros Gorge in south-western Crete, later cultivated in the Linz botanical collection, and its publication fixed the name Prospero minimum. The specific epithet minimum alludes to the plant's diminutive stature—both its bulbs barely 1.8 cm long and its thread-like leaves less than 1 mm wide.
