= Prospero elisae =

Scientific classification
- Kingdom: Plantae
- Clade: Tracheophytes
- Clade: Angiosperms
- Clade: Monocots
- Order: Asparagales
- Family: Asparagaceae
- Subfamily: Scilloideae
- Genus: Prospero
- Species: P. elisae

Binomial name
- Prospero elisae Speta

Synonyms
- Scilla elisae (Speta) Valdés

Species of flowering plant

Prospero elisae is an autumnal flowering plant of the family Asparagaceae, subfamily Scilloideae native to the Pannonian Basin. It is an hexaploid species in the Prospero autumnale cryptic species complex.
