= Prospero paratethycum =

Scientific classification
- Kingdom: Plantae
- Clade: Tracheophytes
- Clade: Angiosperms
- Clade: Monocots
- Order: Asparagales
- Family: Asparagaceae
- Subfamily: Scilloideae
- Genus: Prospero
- Species: P. paratethycum

Binomial name
- Prospero paratethycum Speta

Synonyms
- Scilla paratethyca (Speta) Valdés

Species of flowering plant

Prospero paratethycum is an autumnal flowering plant of the family Asparagaceae, subfamily Scilloideae native to the Pannonian Basin. It is a diploid species in the Prospero autumnale cryptic species complex.
