= Prospero rhadamanthi =

Conservation status
- Data Deficient (IUCN 3.1)

Scientific classification
- Kingdom: Plantae
- Clade: Tracheophytes
- Clade: Angiosperms
- Clade: Monocots
- Order: Asparagales
- Family: Asparagaceae
- Subfamily: Scilloideae
- Genus: Prospero
- Species: P. rhadamanthi

Binomial name
- Prospero rhadamanthi Speta

Synonyms
- Scilla rhadamanthi (Speta) Valdés

Species of flowering plant

Prospero rhadamanthi is a species of flowering plant of the family Asparagaceae, subfamily Scilloideae endemic to Crete, Greece. It is a diploid species in the Prospero autumnale cryptic species complex. This delicate autumn-flowering plant produces pale pink nodding flowers on slender stems after its grass-like leaves emerge. First collected in 1996 from Petres Gorge near Karoti in Crete at low elevations (5–80 metres), it was recognized as a distinct species in 2000.

== Description ==
Prospero rhadamanthi is a bulbous perennial that develops from a nearly spherical to ovoid underground bulb measuring about 1.6–2 cm in length and 1.3–1.8 cm in width, enclosed within a brown papery tunic. In autumn, before the flowers open, the plant produces between five and fourteen slender, grass-like leaves up to 20 cm long and 1.2–2 mm wide. Soon after, one or two leafless flowering stems (scapes), each about 1 mm thick, rise to a height of 12–16 cm and carry between five and twenty-eight nodding flowers on stalks (pedicels) 4–7 mm long.

Each flower bears six pale pink perianth segments measuring approximately 6 mm by 2 mm, with a distinct green keel on the underside. The stamens consist of lanceolate filaments, also pale pink and about 4 mm long, arising from a white base. The ovary is pale violet, around 2 mm long and 1.5 mm in diameter, topped by a style roughly 1.8 mm long. Following pollination, the plant forms a spherical capsule roughly 3 mm in diameter, which contains black seeds about 1.8–2 mm in length. Chromosome studies have established a diploid number of 2n = 14. The species was first collected by Franz Speta in May 1996 from Petres Gorge near Karoti, at elevations of 5–80 m.

== Taxonomy ==
Prospero rhadamanthi is placed in the family Asparagaceae, within the genus Prospero—an assemblage of autumn-flowering bulbous plants formerly included in Scilla. It was one of six new species described by Franz Speta in 2000 after detailed study of Cretan populations revealed consistent differences in bulb tunic, leaf emergence, floral structure and chromosome number. Prospero rhadamanthi is distinguished cytologically by a diploid chromosome count of 2n=14 and morphologically by its subglobose to ovoid bulbs with brown tunics and branched roots. The holotype was collected on 17 May 1996 from Petres Gorge near Karoti (5–80 m elevation) and is preserved at the Biologiezentrum Linz herbarium.
