= Prospero hierae =

Conservation status
- Vulnerable (IUCN 3.1)

Scientific classification
- Kingdom: Plantae
- Clade: Tracheophytes
- Clade: Angiosperms
- Clade: Monocots
- Order: Asparagales
- Family: Asparagaceae
- Subfamily: Scilloideae
- Genus: Prospero
- Species: P. hierae

Binomial name
- Prospero hierae C.Brullo, Brullo, Giusso, Pavone & Salmeri

Species of flowering plant

Prospero hierae is an autumnal flowering plant of the family Asparagaceae, subfamily Scilloideae endemic to Marettimo, Italy. It is a diploid species in the Prospero autumnale cryptic species complex.
