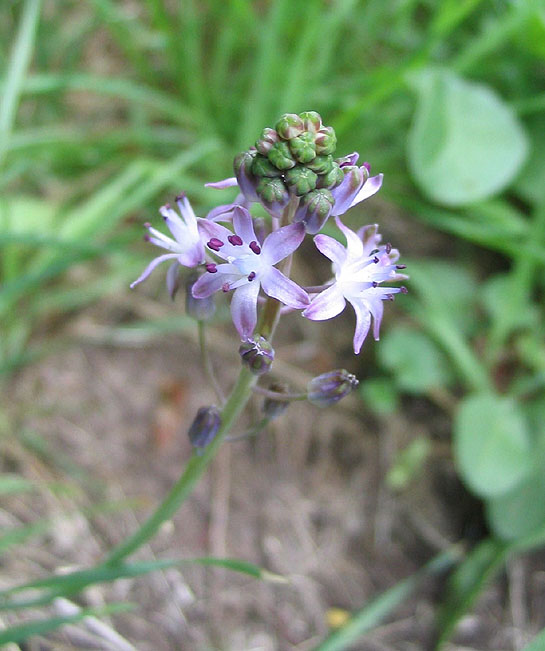
- Prospero autumnale

Scientific classification
- Kingdom: Plantae
- Clade: Tracheophytes
- Clade: Angiosperms
- Clade: Monocots
- Order: Asparagales
- Family: Asparagaceae
- Subfamily: Scilloideae
- Genus: Prospero; Salisb.

= Prospero (plant) =

Genus of flowering plants

Prospero is a genus of bulbous flowering plants in the family Asparagaceae, subfamily Scilloideae (also treated as the family Hyacinthaceae). It is distributed in Europe, around the Mediterranean, and through the Middle East to the Caucasus.

== Description ==
Species of Prospero grow from bulbs, the leaves and flowers appearing in the autumn and dying down in spring. The leaves are relatively narrow. Each bulb produces one to four flowering stems (scapes) bearing dense racemes of pink to violet flowers. The 4–10 mm (0.2–0.4 in) long tepals are not joined together. The stamens have filaments coloured like the tepals and short purple anthers. The dark brown seeds are more-or-less oblong.

== Systematics ==
The genus Prospero was included in a posthumously published work including names and descriptions by Richard Salisbury in 1866. However, some species then placed in the genus, such as P. hyacinthoideum and P. lingulatum, are currently placed in other genera. Franz Speta and co-workers from the 1970s onwards split up the broadly defined genus Scilla, placing many species into separate genera. The modern understanding of Prospero dates from 1982, with Speta's re-assignment of Scilla autumnalis (among other species) to Prospero.

The genus is placed in the tribe Hyacintheae (or the subfamily Hyacinthoideae by those who use the family Hyacinthaceae).

=== Species ===
As of July 2025, Plants of the World Online accepts 17 species:

- Prospero autumnale (L.) Speta
- Prospero battagliae Speta
- Prospero corsicum (Boullu) J.-M.Tison
- Prospero cudidaghense Firat & Yıldırım
- Prospero depressum Speta
- Prospero elisae Speta
- Prospero fallax (Steinh.) Speta
- Prospero hanburyi (Baker) Speta
- Prospero hierae C.Brullo, Brullo, Giusso, Pavone & Salmeri
- Prospero hierapytnense Speta
- Prospero idaeum Speta
- Prospero minimum Speta
- Prospero obtusifolium (Poir.) Speta
- Prospero paratethycum Speta
- Prospero rhadamanthi Speta
- Prospero seisumsianum (Rukšāns & Zetterl.) Yıldırım
- Prospero talosii (Tzanoud. & Kypr.) Speta
