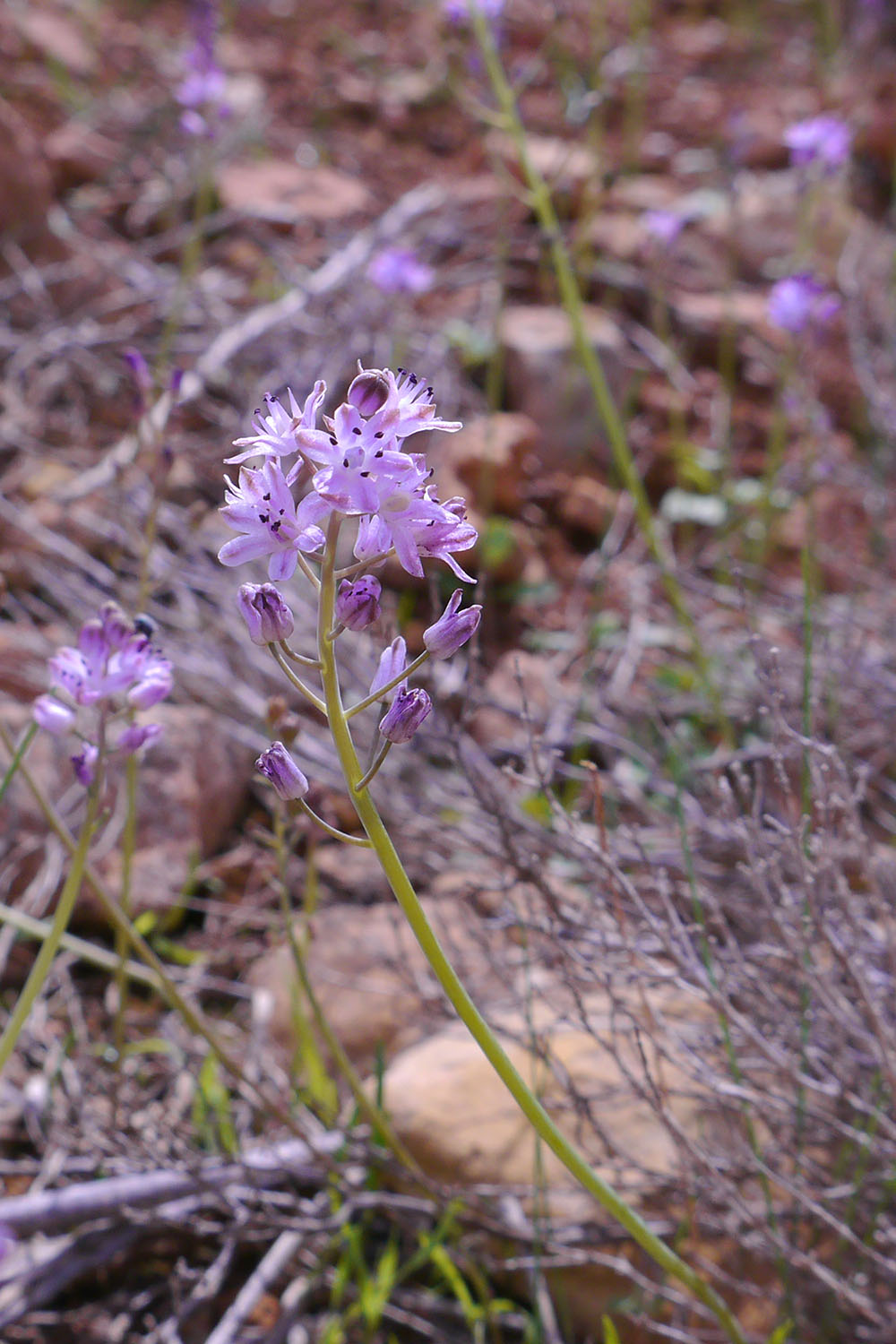
- Prospero obtusifolium

Conservation status
- Near Threatened (IUCN 3.1)

Scientific classification
- Kingdom: Plantae
- Clade: Tracheophytes
- Clade: Angiosperms
- Clade: Monocots
- Order: Asparagales
- Family: Asparagaceae
- Subfamily: Scilloideae
- Genus: Prospero
- Species: P. obtusifolium

Binomial name
- Prospero obtusifolium (Poir.) Speta

Synonyms
- Scilla obtusifolia Poir.; Scilla parviflora Guss.

= Prospero obtusifolium =

Species of flowering plant

Prospero obtusifolium is an autumnal flowering plant of the family Asparagaceae, subfamily Scilloideae native to southern Europe and North Africa.
