= Imbros (disambiguation) =

Imbros is an island in Turkey. It may also refer to:

- Imbros Gorge, a canyon on the Greek island of Crete
- Imbros (horse), an American thoroughbred racehorse

== See also ==
- Battle of Imbros (1717)
- Battle of Imbros (1918)
