= Prospero corsicum =

Conservation status
- Least Concern (IUCN 3.1)

Scientific classification
- Kingdom: Plantae
- Clade: Tracheophytes
- Clade: Angiosperms
- Clade: Monocots
- Order: Asparagales
- Family: Asparagaceae
- Subfamily: Scilloideae
- Genus: Prospero
- Species: P. corsicum

Binomial name
- Prospero corsicum (Boullu) J.-M.Tison

Synonyms
- Scilla corsica Boullu; Scilla autumnalis var. corsica (Boullu) Rouy; Scilla autumnalis var. corsica (Boullu) Briq.; Scilla autumnalis var. corsica (Boullu) Nyman; Scilla autumnalis subsp. corsica (Boullu) Cif. & Giacom.

Species of flowering plant

Prospero corsicum is an autumnal flowering plant of the family Asparagaceae, subfamily Scilloideae found in Corsica in France and Sardinia in Italy. It is a diploid species in the Prospero autumnale cryptic species complex.
