= Scopula mentzeri =

Scientific classification
- Domain: Eukaryota
- Kingdom: Animalia
- Phylum: Arthropoda
- Class: Insecta
- Order: Lepidoptera
- Family: Geometridae
- Genus: Scopula
- Species: S. mentzeri

Binomial name
- Scopula mentzeri (Hausmann, 1993)

Synonyms
- Glossotrophia mentzeri Hausmann, 1993

Species of geometer moth in subfamily Sterrhinae

Scopula mentzeri is a moth of the family Geometridae. It is found on Crete.

The larvae feed on Berberis cretica.
