= Prospero depressum =

Conservation status
- Vulnerable (IUCN 3.1)

Scientific classification
- Kingdom: Plantae
- Clade: Embryophytes
- Clade: Tracheophytes
- Clade: Angiosperms
- Clade: Monocots
- Order: Asparagales
- Family: Asparagaceae
- Subfamily: Scilloideae
- Genus: Prospero
- Species: P. depressum

Binomial name
- Prospero depressum Speta

Synonyms
- Scilla depressa (Speta) Valdés

Species of flowering plant

Prospero depressum is a flowering plant of the family Asparagaceae, subfamily Scilloideae endemic to Crete, Greece. It is a diploid species in the Prospero autumnale cryptic species complex. This autumn-flowering plant features nearly white blooms on short stems that emerge after its grass-like leaves appear. It was first collected in 1997 from the sandy eastern shore of lake Omalos at an elevation of about 1050 metres, and was formally recognized as a distinct species in 2000.

== Description ==
Prospero depressum is a bulbous perennial that develops from a nearly spherical to ovoid underground bulb measuring about 3.5–4 cm in length and 1.7–2 cm in width; the interior is white and it is wrapped in a brown papery tunic. From this bulb arise thick, branched roots, and in autumn the plant produces 10–15 narrow, grass-like leaves up to 10 cm long and 3–5 mm wide before flowering. During the flowering season it sends up several upright, leafless stems (scapes) 4–8 cm tall and 0.8–1.2 mm thick, each bearing 5–18 flowers on short stalks (pedicels) that are 1.5–3 mm long, extending to about 7 mm when in fruit.

Each flower bears six pale, almost white perianth segments (the combined petals and sepals) about 5.5 mm long and 2 mm wide, each with a greenish-brown ridge (keel) on the underside. The six stamens have lance-shaped (lanceolate) filaments about 3.6 mm long and 0.9 mm wide at the base, which are white at their base and faintly rose-coloured towards the tip. The ovoid ovary is white, around 2.4 mm long and 1.4 mm wide, topped by a style approximately 2 mm long. After pollination, a spherical capsule roughly 3 mm in diameter forms, containing black seeds about 2.8 mm long and 1.5 mm wide. Chromosome studies show a diploid number of 2n=14.

== Taxonomy ==
Prospero depressum is placed in the family Asparagaceae within the autumn-flowering genus Prospero, which was segregated from Scilla following morphological and cytological studies. It was one of six new species described by Franz Speta in 2000 after investigation of Cretan populations revealed clear distinctions in bulb size, tunic colour, root structure and chromosome number. The holotype (N. Böhling & W. Greuter 6921) was collected on 24 October 1997 from the sandy eastern shore of lake Omalos at about 1050 m elevation and is preserved at the Biologiezentrum Linz herbarium.
