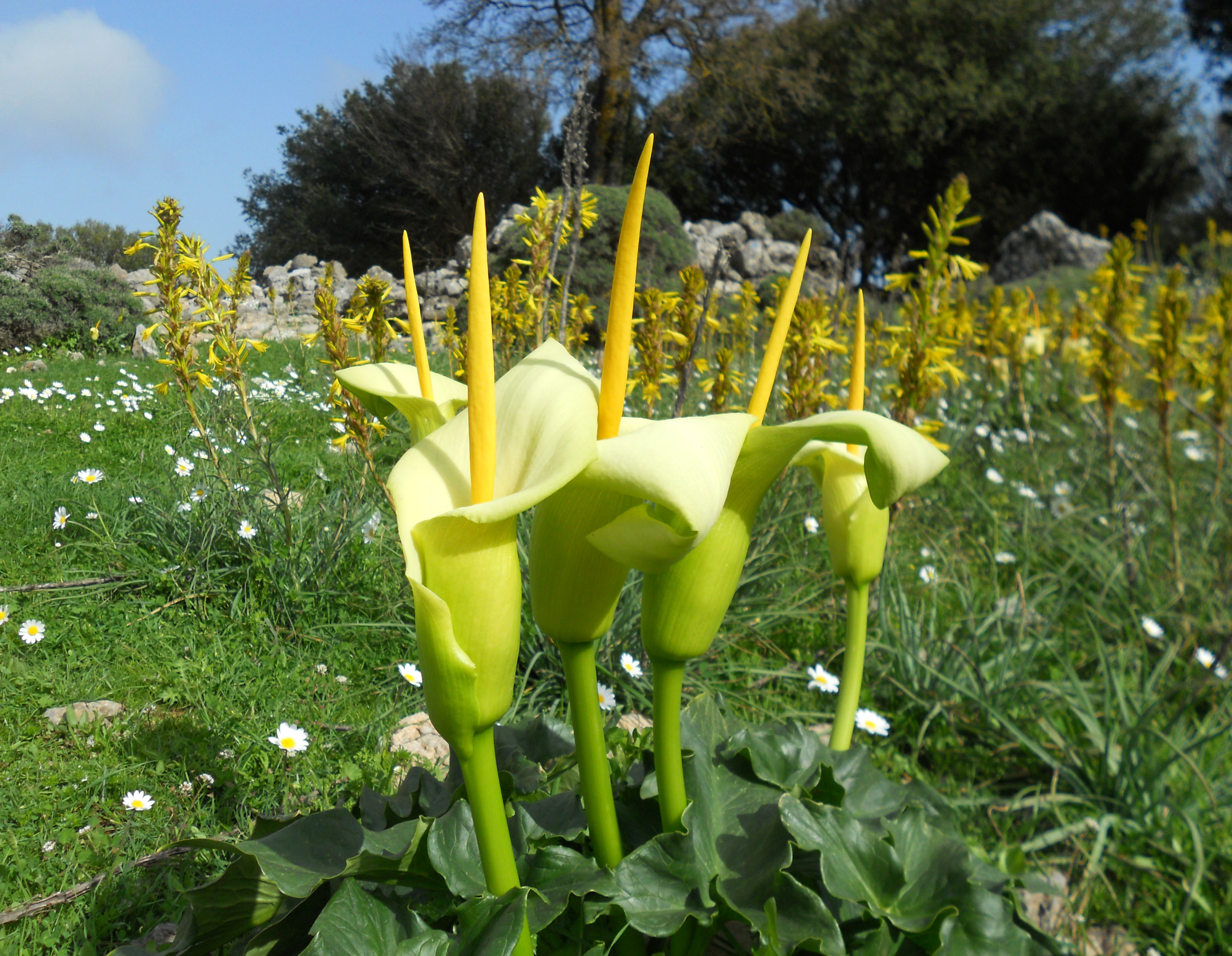

Scientific classification
- Kingdom: Plantae
- Clade: Tracheophytes
- Clade: Angiosperms
- Clade: Monocots
- Order: Alismatales
- Family: Araceae
- Genus: Arum
- Species: A. creticum

Binomial name
- Arum creticum Boiss. & Heldr. (1854)

= Arum creticum =

Species of plant

Arum creticum, the Cretan arum, is a species in of flowering plant in the family Araceae. It is native to the Greek island of Crete (Kriti), the Eastern Aegean Islands, and southwestern Turkey. This semi-evergreen clump-forming tuberous perennial has large arrow-shaped leaves. Erect folded-back spathes of fragrant yellow or cream appear in spring, with longer narrow spadices of a darker yellow. The flowers are followed in autumn by clusters of red or orange fruit. The plant reaches 50 cm (20 in) tall and broad.

== Description ==
By relative inflorescence height, Arum species are divided into "cryptic" species, whose inflorescences are borne on a short peduncle amid or below the leaves, and "flag" species, whose inflorescences are above leaf level at the end of long peduncles. A. creticum is a flag species.

== Taxonomy ==
Together with Arum idaeum it has been placed in subsection Cretica, which has been confirmed through genetic testing. They are estimated to have split about 2.2 Mya. No other species are related within 5 Mya.

== Cultivation ==
Arum creticum is cultivated as an ornamental plant in temperate gardens. It is hardy but requires a sheltered position in sun or partial shade, with moist soil.

== Toxicity ==
Caution should be exercised when handling it, as it is an irritant and toxic if ingested.

== Gallery ==
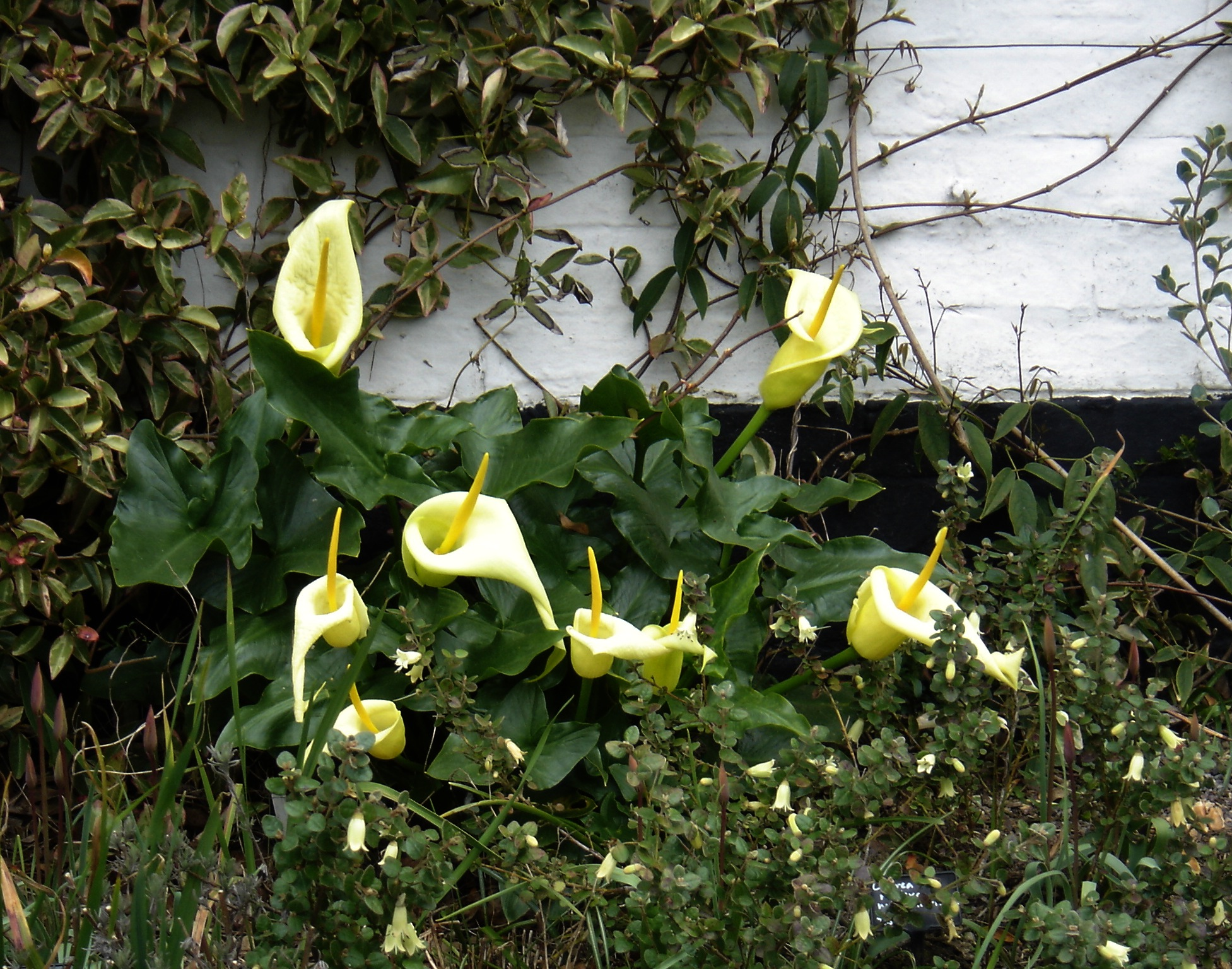

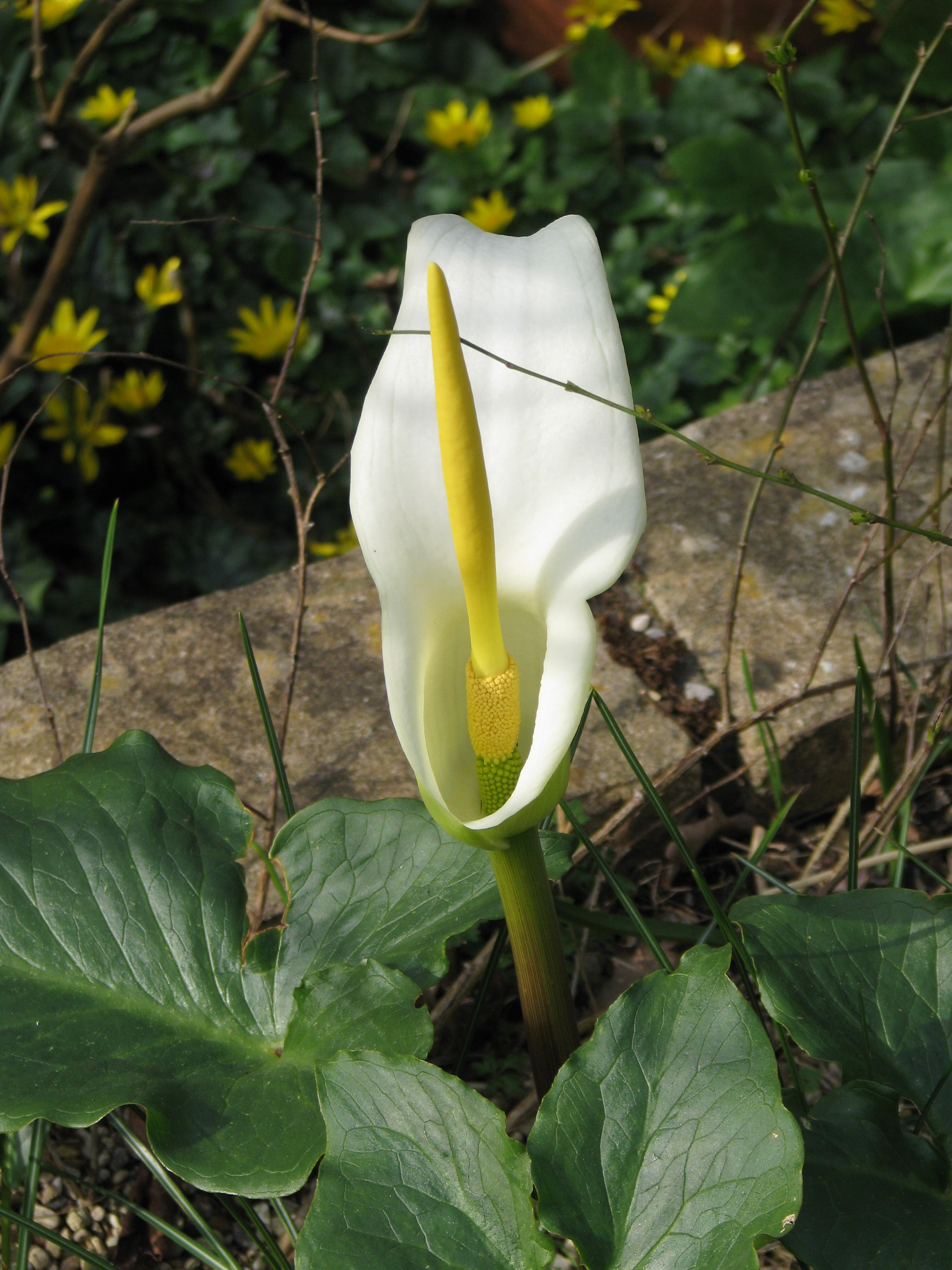
'Marmaris White'

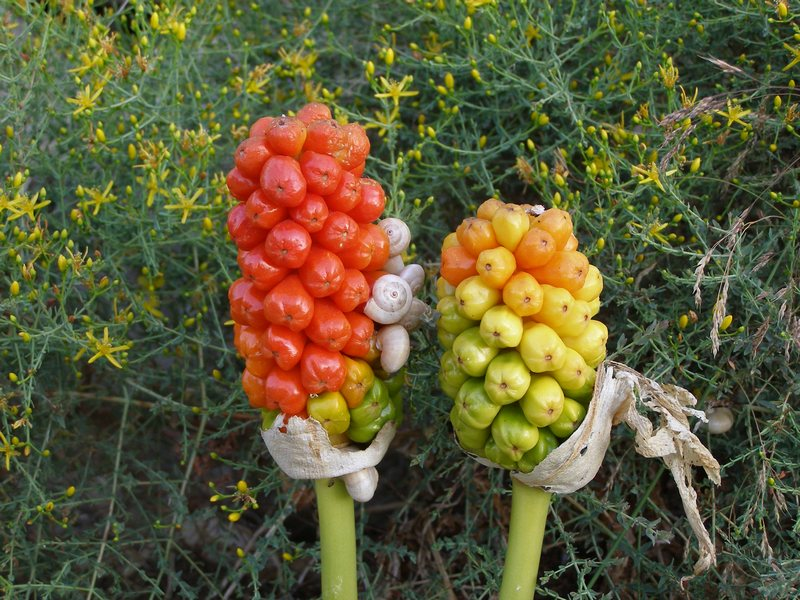

== Bibliography ==
- Linz, Jeanine; Stökl, Johannes; Urru, Isabella; Krügel, Tamara; Stensmyr, Marcus C.; Hansson, Bill S. (2010-04-01). "Molecular phylogeny of the genus Arum (Araceae) inferred from multi–locus sequence data and AFLPs". Taxon. 59 (2): 405–415. Bibcode:2010Taxon..59..405L. doi:10.1002/tax.592006. eISSN 1996-8175.
- Gibernau, Marc; Macquart, David; Przetak, Gilles (2004). "Pollination in the genus Arum – a review" (PDF). Aroideana. 27: 148–166. ISSN 0197-4033.
- Kite, Geoffrey C.; et al. (2000). "Inflorescence odours and pollinators of Arum and Amorphophallus (Araceae)" (PDF). Reproductive Biology in Systematics, Conservation and Economic Botany. pp. 295–315. ISBN 1900347628.
- Boyce, Peter C. (1989). "A New Classification of Arum with Keys to the Infrageneric Taxa". Kew Bulletin. 44 (3): 383–395. Bibcode:1989KewBu..44..383B. doi:10.2307/4110359. ISSN 0075-5974. JSTOR 4110359.
