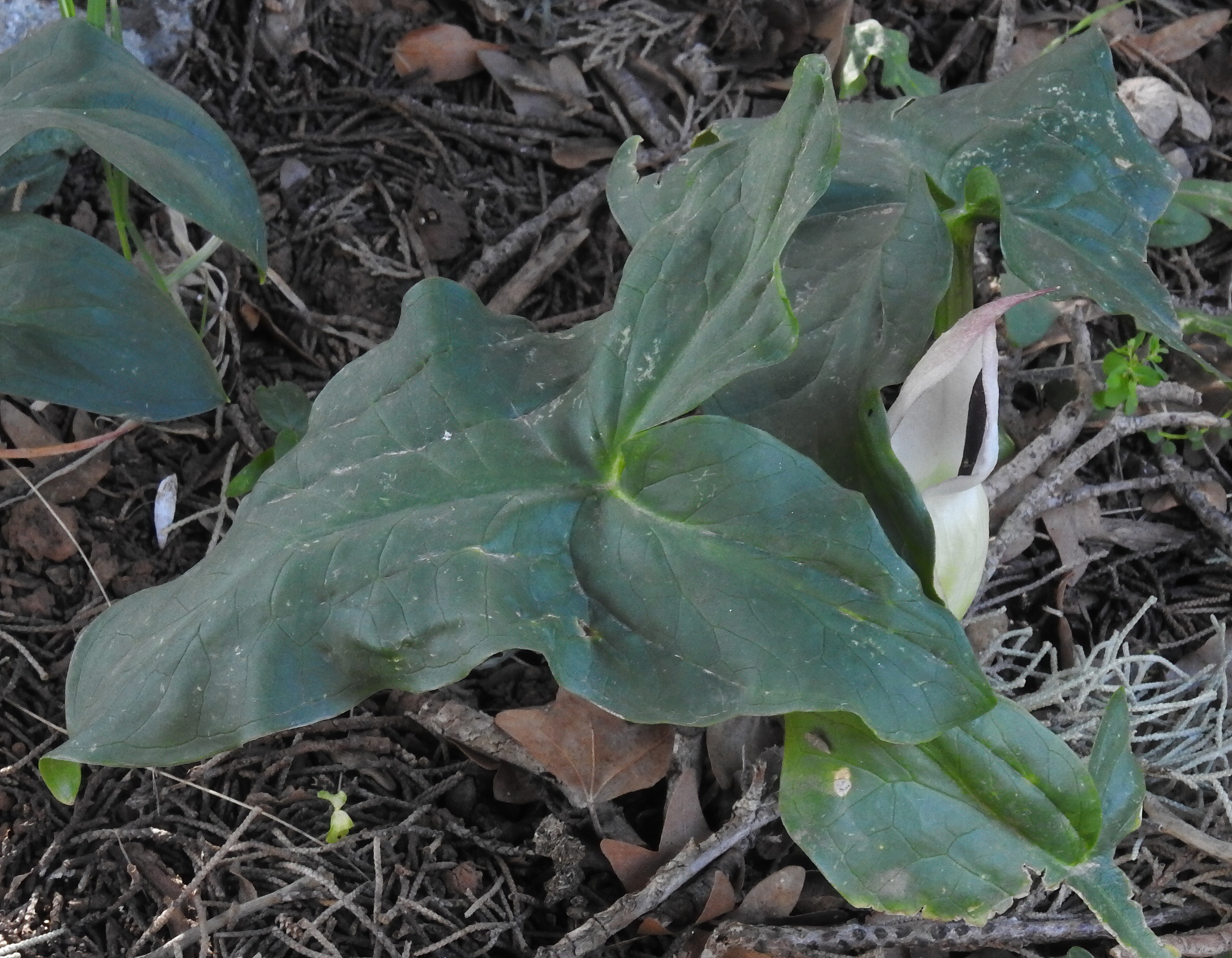

Scientific classification
- Kingdom: Plantae
- Clade: Tracheophytes
- Clade: Angiosperms
- Clade: Monocots
- Order: Alismatales
- Family: Araceae
- Genus: Arum
- Species: A. idaeum

Binomial name
- Arum idaeum Coustur. & Gand. (1917)
- Range of A. idaeum (precise locations only)

= Arum idaeum =

Species of plant

Arum idaeum is a woodland plant species of the family Araceae. It is found on Crete.

== Description ==
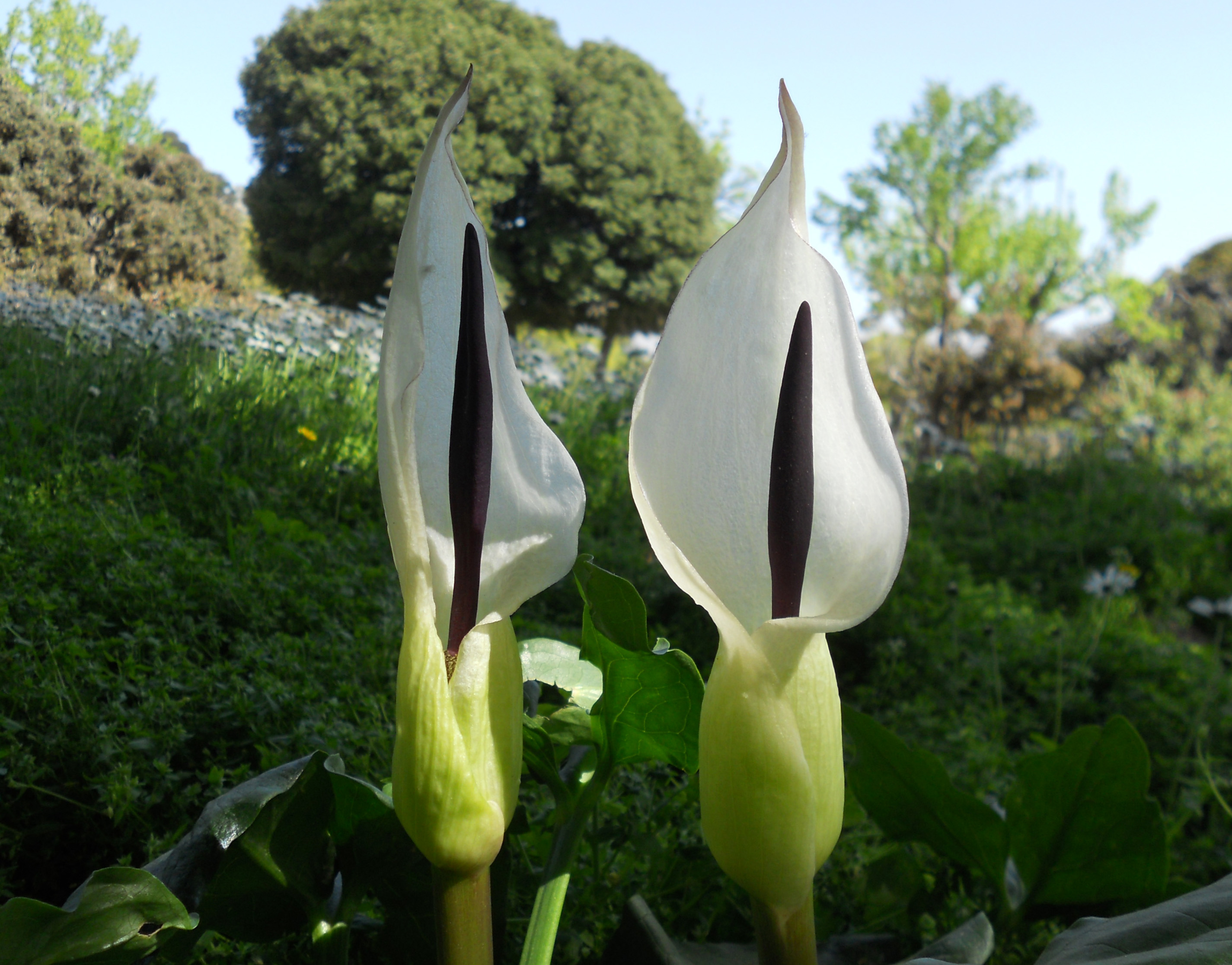
A. idaeum flowers

It has an ovate tuber.

The plant grows 18–22 centimetres (7.1–8.7 in) tall. Stalk base and lower third of petioles is red-veined. Stem is white. Leaves immaculate, and smaller than some coterminous species; ovate-triangular in outline, their lobes horizontally lanceolate, peduncle equal to the leaves.

Spathe is usually almost white, shorter, concolorous, white appendix, far exceeding the spathe, male ring much shorter than female.

Berry is angular, ovate.

== Distribution and habitat ==
It has been recorded at elevations of 1060–1981 m. It often grows under thickets of Berberis cretica.

== Ecology ==
Flowers June–July.

== Taxonomy ==
Together with Arum creticum it has been placed in subsection Cretica, which has been confirmed through genetic testing. They are estimated to have split about 2.2 Mya. No other species are related within 5 Mya.

It was discovered as a species on Mount Ida in 1913–1914 by botanists Paul Cousturier and Michel Gandoger.

== Bibliography ==
- GBIF (2025-05-23). "Arum idaeum Coustur. & Gand. Occurrence Download". Global Biodiversity Information Facility. doi:10.15468/dl.je2nan.
- Kew (2023). "Arum rupicola Boiss". International Plant Names Index and World Checklist of Vascular Plants.
- Linz, Jeanine; Stökl, Johannes; Urru, Isabella; Krügel, Tamara; Stensmyr, Marcus C.; Hansson, Bill S. (2010-04-01). "Molecular phylogeny of the genus Arum (Araceae) inferred from multi–locus sequence data and AFLPs". Taxon. 59 (2): 405–415. Bibcode:2010Taxon..59..405L. doi:10.1002/tax.592006. eISSN 1996-8175.
- Kite, Geoffrey C.; et al. (2000). "Inflorescence odours and pollinators of Arum and Amorphophallus (Araceae)" (PDF). Reproductive Biology in Systematics, Conservation and Economic Botany. pp. 295–315. ISBN 1900347628.
- Boyce, Peter C. (1989). "A New Classification of Arum with Keys to the Infrageneric Taxa". Kew Bulletin. 44 (3): 383–395. Bibcode:1989KewBu..44..383B. doi:10.2307/4110359. ISSN 0075-5974. JSTOR 4110359.
- Cousturier, Paul; Gandoger, Michel (1916). "Herborisations en Crète (1913–1914)". Bulletin de la Société botanique de France. 63 (published 1917): 1–15. ISSN 0181-1789.
