= Prospero talosii =

Conservation status
- Critically Endangered (IUCN 3.1)

Scientific classification
- Kingdom: Plantae
- Clade: Tracheophytes
- Clade: Angiosperms
- Clade: Monocots
- Order: Asparagales
- Family: Asparagaceae
- Subfamily: Scilloideae
- Genus: Prospero
- Species: P. talosii

Binomial name
- Prospero talosii (Tzanoud. & Kypr.) Speta

Synonyms
- Scilla talosii Tzanoud. & Kypr.

Species of flowering plant

Prospero talosii is an autumnal flowering plant of the family Asparagaceae, subfamily Scilloideae endemic to the small Dia Island near Crete, Greece. The species is polyploid, and has the largest chromosome number in the genus. Fewer than 50 individuals are known in the wild, and the species is considered Critically Endangered
