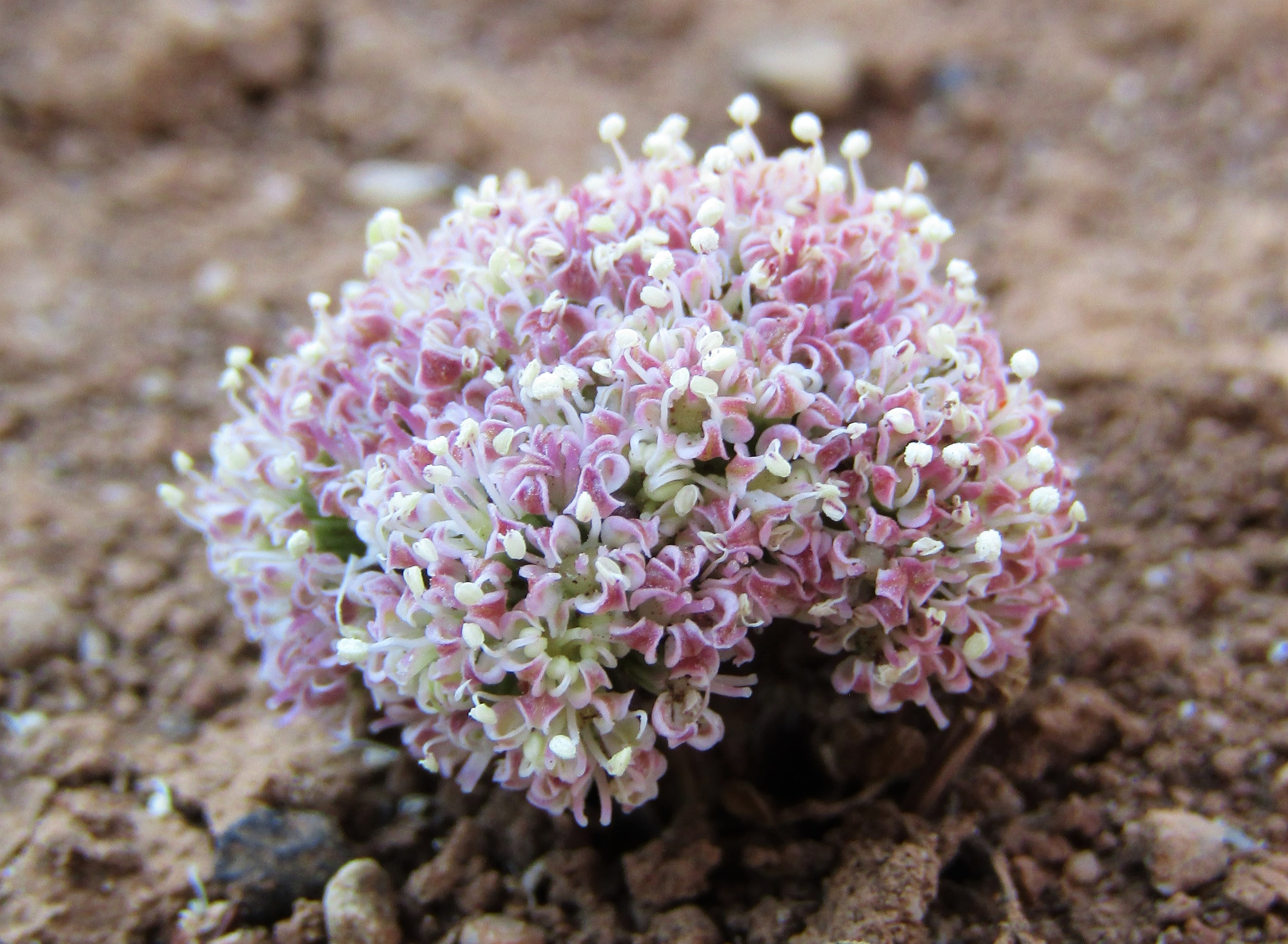

Conservation status
- Critically Endangered (IUCN 3.1)

Scientific classification
- Kingdom: Plantae
- Clade: Tracheophytes
- Clade: Angiosperms
- Clade: Eudicots
- Clade: Asterids
- Order: Apiales
- Family: Apiaceae
- Genus: Horstrissea; Greuter, Gerstb. & Egli
- Species: H. dolinicola

Binomial name
- Horstrissea dolinicola Greuter, Gerstb. & Egli

= Horstrissea =

Genus of flowering plants

Horstrissea is a monotypic genus of flowering plant in the family Apiaceae. Its only species is Horstrissea dolinicola. The genus and species were first described in 1990. It is endemic to Crete, where it lives at an elevation of around 1,500 metres (4,900 ft) in the Mount Ida range. It is threatened by habitat loss.
