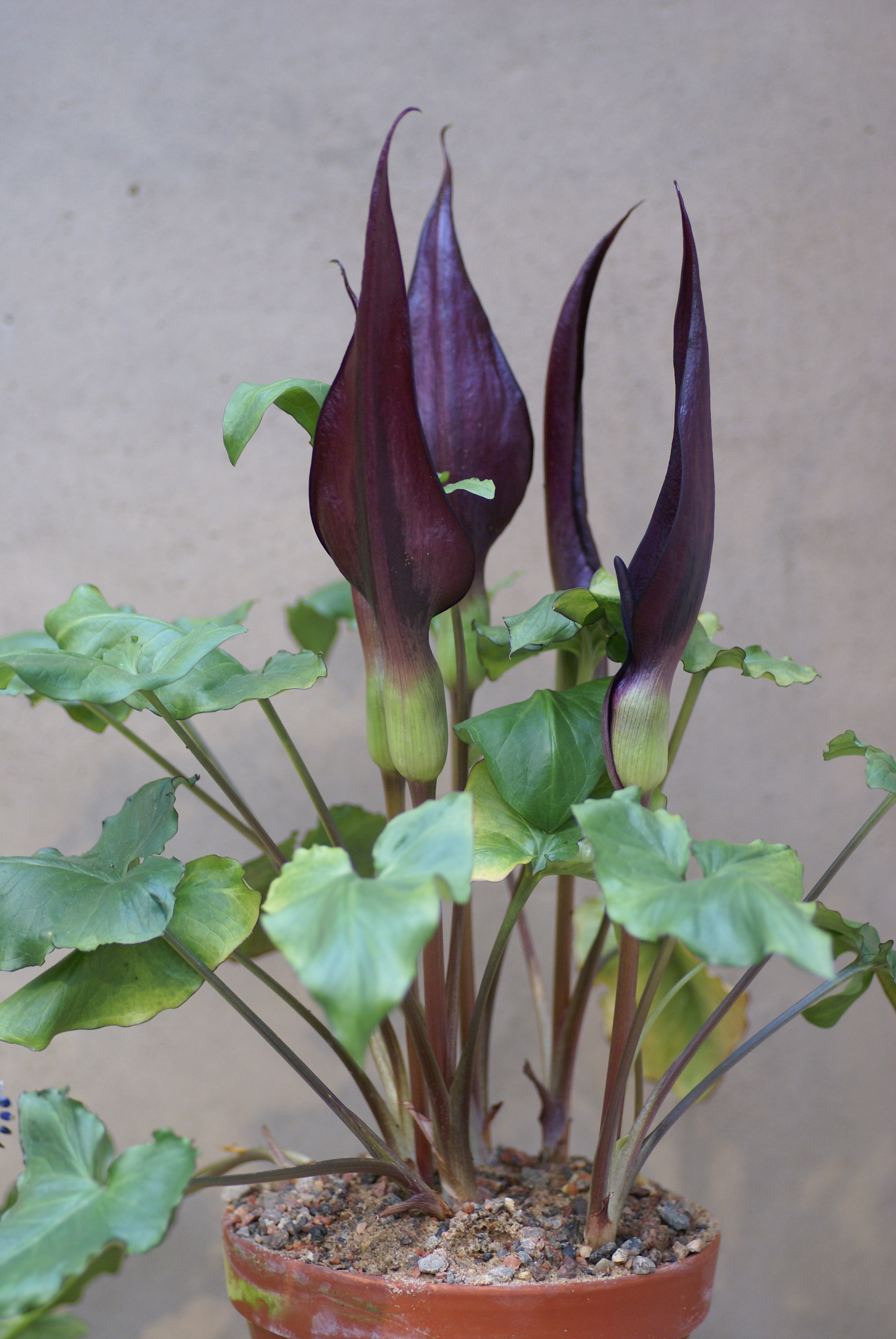

Conservation status
- Vulnerable (IUCN 3.1)

Scientific classification
- Kingdom: Plantae
- Clade: Tracheophytes
- Clade: Angiosperms
- Clade: Monocots
- Order: Alismatales
- Family: Araceae
- Genus: Arum
- Species: A. purpureospathum

Binomial name
- Arum purpureospathum P.C.Boyce (1987)

= Arum purpureospathum =

Species of plant

Arum purpureospathum is a woodland plant species of the family Araceae. It is found on Crete.

== Bibliography ==
- Kew (2023). "Arum rupicola Boiss". International Plant Names Index and World Checklist of Vascular Plants.
- Kite, Geoffrey C.; et al. (2000). "Inflorescence odours and pollinators of Arum and Amorphophallus (Araceae)" (PDF). Reproductive Biology in Systematics, Conservation and Economic Botany. Royal Botanic Gardens, Kew. pp. 295–315. ISBN 1900347628.
