= Karoti =

- Village
- Location in Rajasthan, India Karoti (India)
- Country: India
- State: Rajasthan
- District: Sirohi
- Tehsil: Reodar

Government
  - Body: Gram Panchayat

Population (2011)
  - Total: 971

Languages
  - Official: Hindi
  - Local: Rajasthani/Marwari
- Time zone: UTC+5:30 (IST)
- PIN: 307514
- Vehicle registration: RJ-24

== Overview ==
Karoti is a village in the Reodar tehsil of Sirohi district in the Indian state of Rajasthan. It is situated about 5 km from Reodar town and around 50 km south-west of the district headquarters at Sirohi. The village is administered by a Gram Panchayat under the Panchayati Raj system.

== See also ==
- Sirohi district
- Mount Abu
- Reodar
