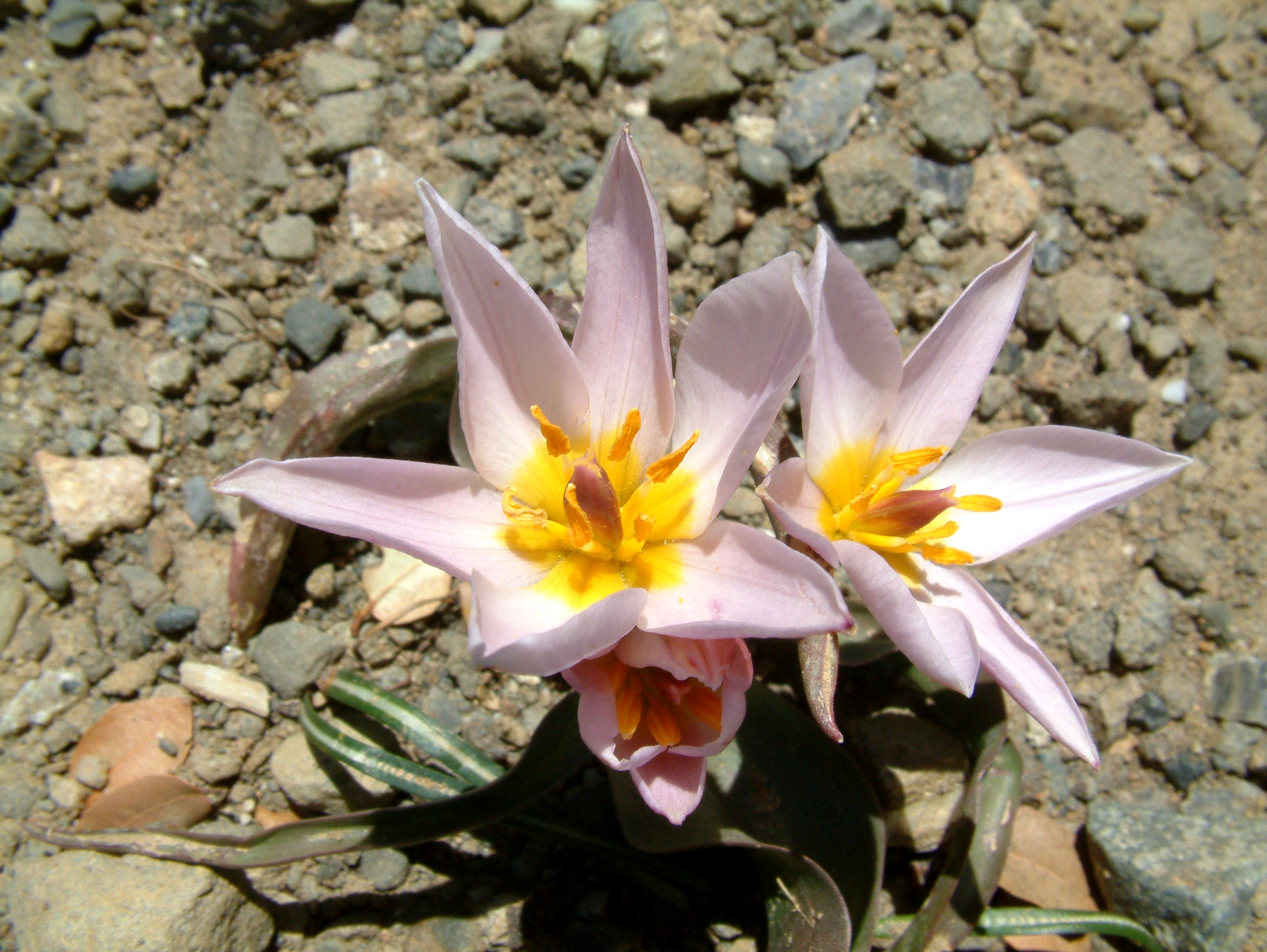
- Flowers
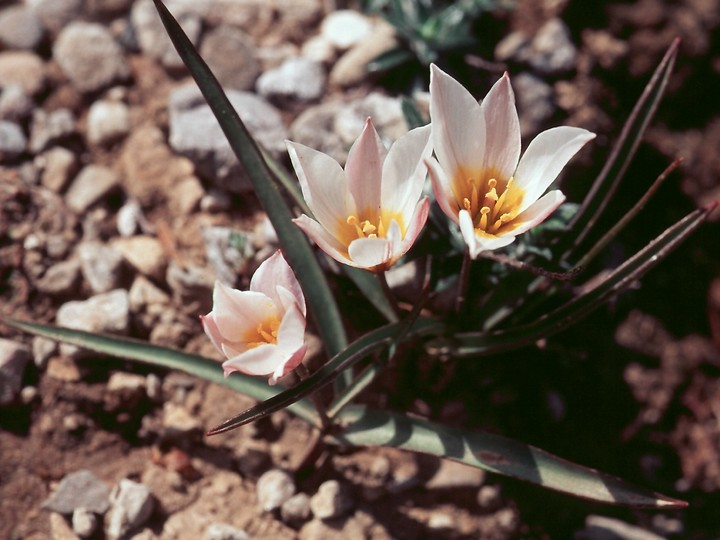
- Habit

Conservation status
- Least Concern (IUCN 3.1)

Scientific classification
- Kingdom: Plantae
- Clade: Tracheophytes
- Clade: Angiosperms
- Clade: Monocots
- Order: Liliales
- Family: Liliaceae
- Subfamily: Lilioideae
- Tribe: Lilieae
- Genus: Tulipa
- Species: T. cretica

Binomial name
- Tulipa cretica Boiss. & Heldr.

Synonyms
- Tulipa sylvestris var. cretica (Boiss. & Heldr.) Regel

= Tulipa cretica =

Species of plant

Tulipa cretica, the Cretan tulip, is a species of flowering plant in the family Liliaceae, endemic to Crete. A bulbous geophyte reaching 25 cm (10 in) with white flowers that fade to pink, it is typically found growing in rocky habitats such as noncoastal cliffs and mountain peaks. There are a number of cultivars, including 'Dikti', 'Archanes', and 'Chania', with 'Hilde' being available from commercial suppliers.

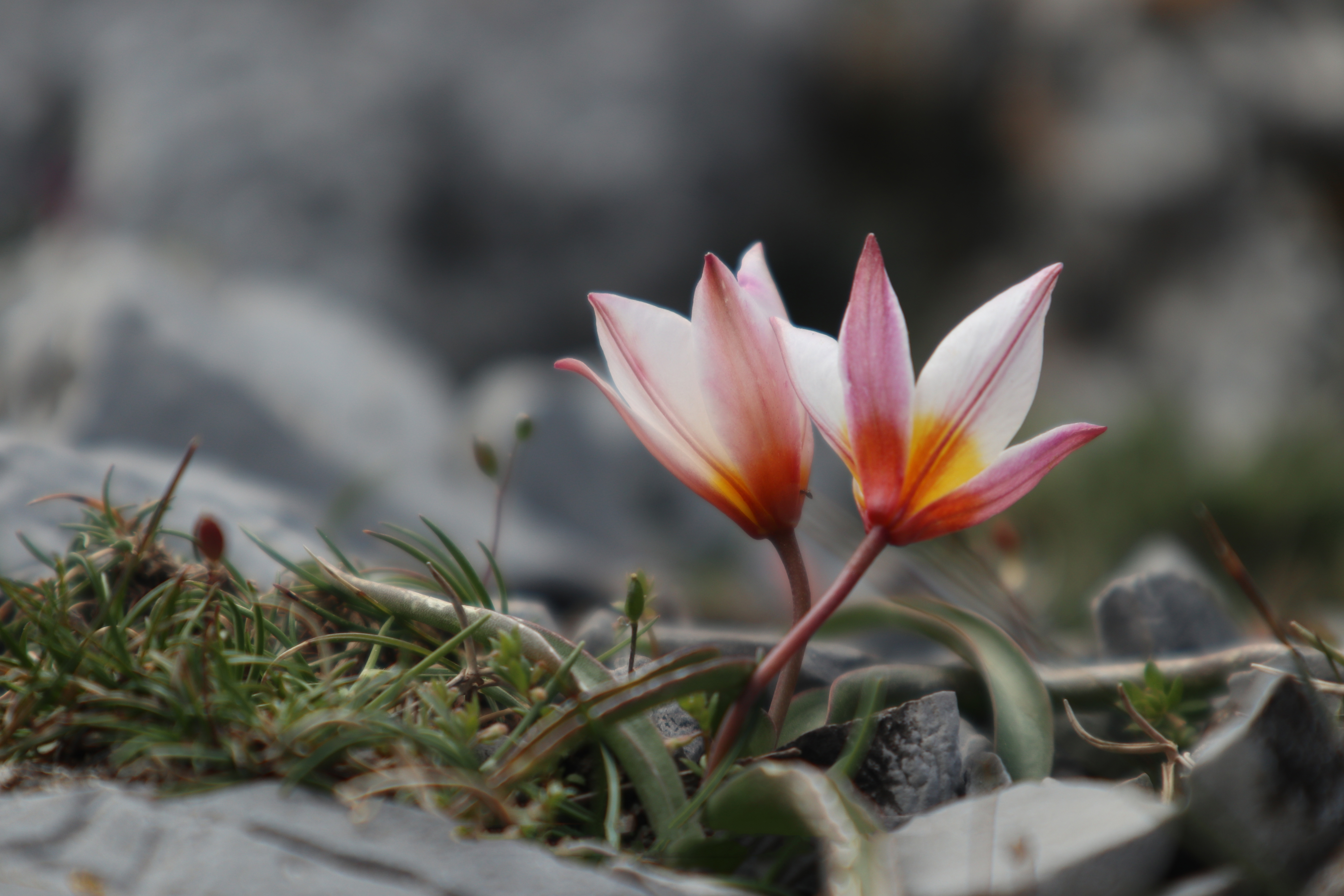
Side view of flowers

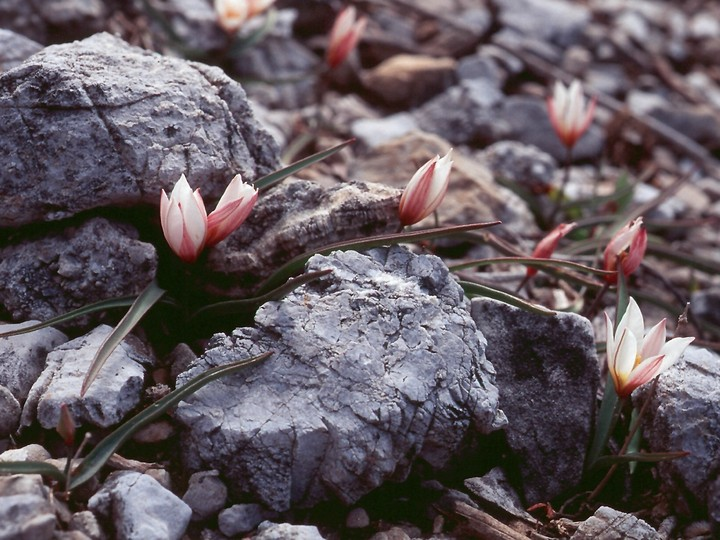
Amongst rocks

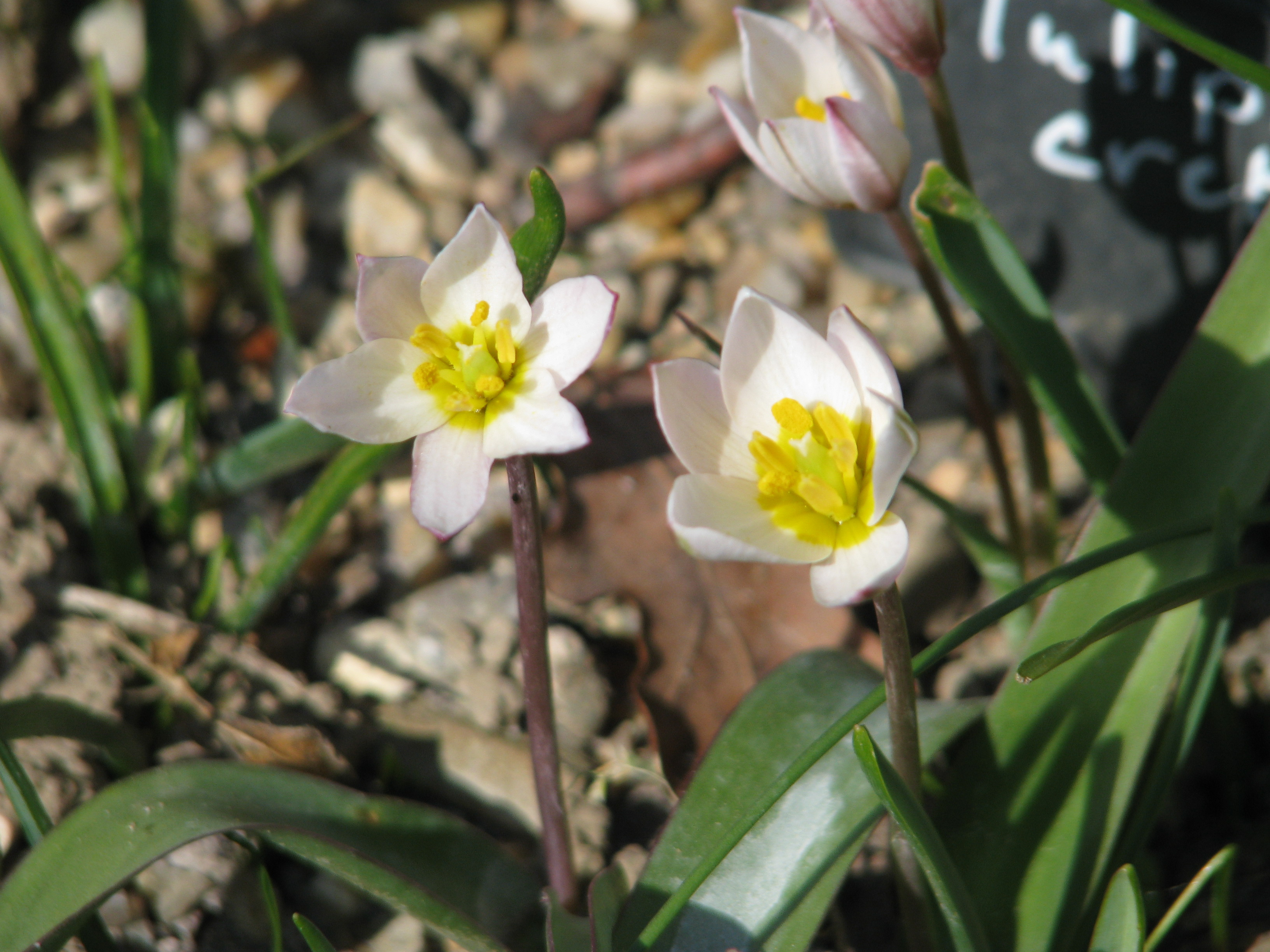
Close-up of flowers

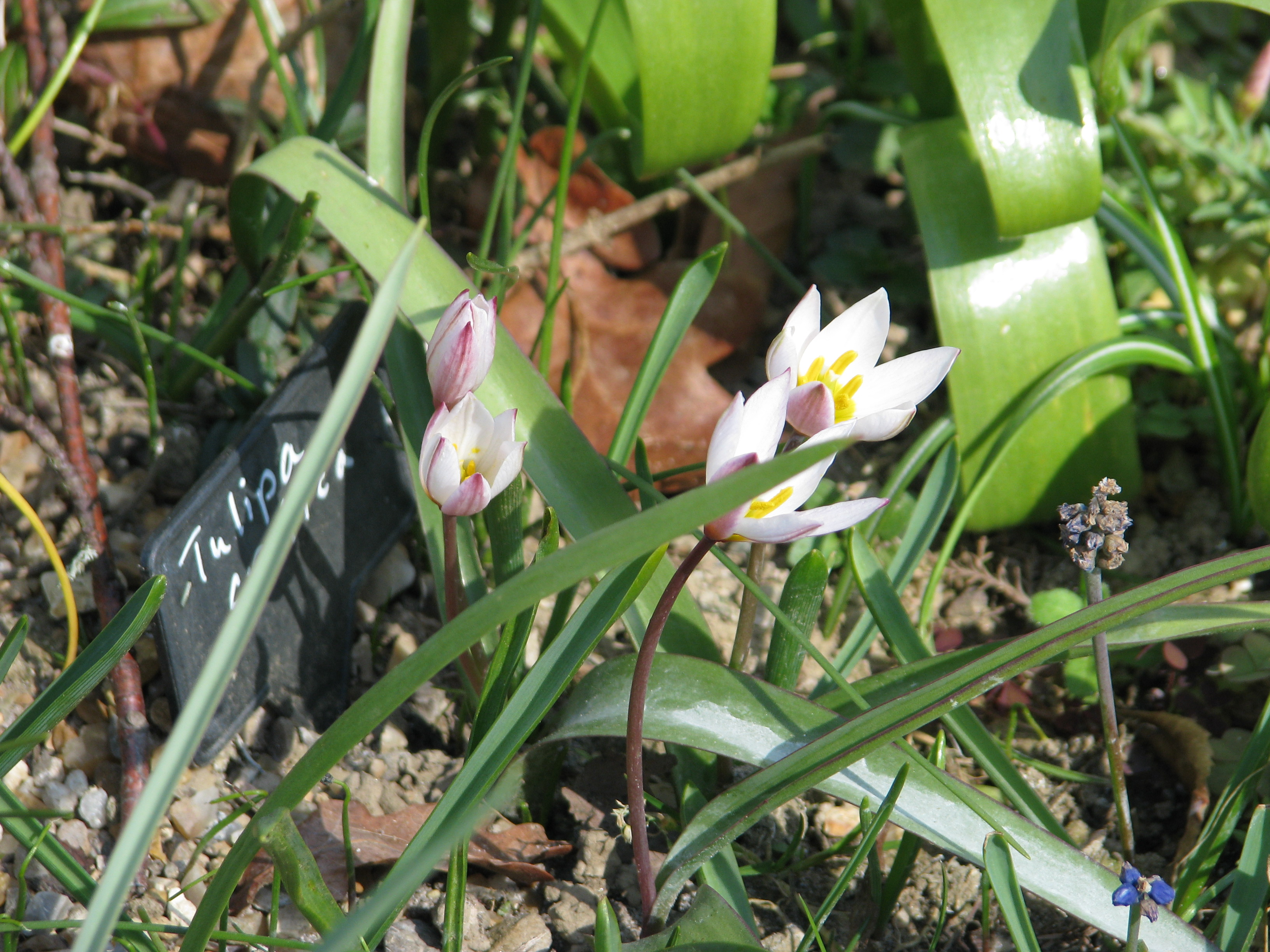
Labeled specimen

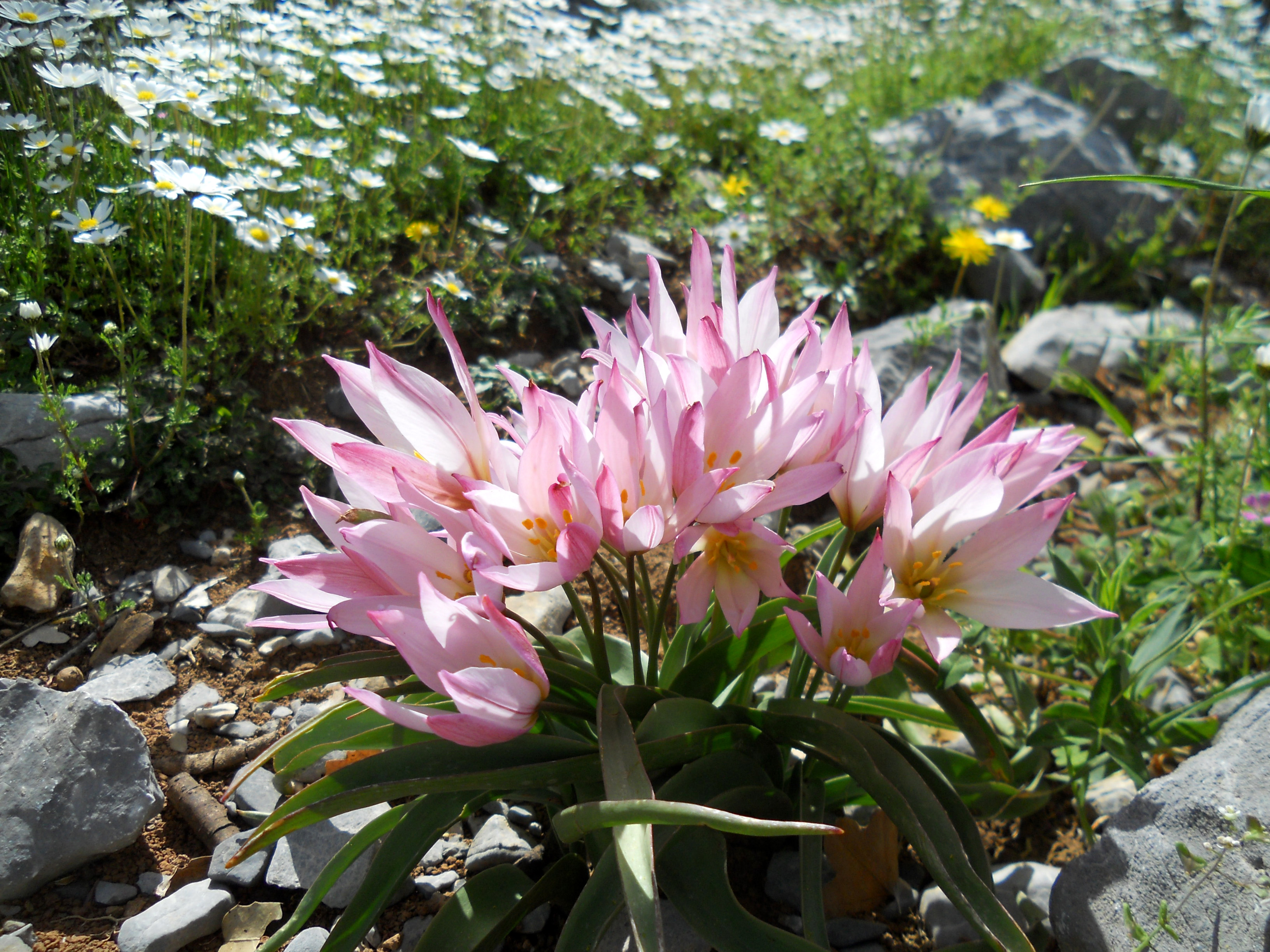
A clump
