= Prospero battagliae =

Conservation status
- Data Deficient (IUCN 3.1)

Scientific classification
- Kingdom: Plantae
- Clade: Tracheophytes
- Clade: Angiosperms
- Clade: Monocots
- Order: Asparagales
- Family: Asparagaceae
- Subfamily: Scilloideae
- Genus: Prospero
- Species: P. battagliae

Binomial name
- Prospero battagliae Speta

Synonyms
- Scilla battagliae (Speta) Valdés

Species of flowering plant

Prospero battagliae is a flowering plant of the family Asparagaceae, subfamily Scilloideae endemic to Crete, Greece. This autumn-flowering plant produces nodding pale violet blooms on slender stems after its grass-like leaves emerge. First collected in 1981 from Mesa Lasithi in Crete at an elevation of about 860 metres, it was formally recognized as a distinct species in 2000 and is characterized for its distinctive wine-red leaf bases and rose-tinted bulb flesh.

== Description ==
Prospero battagliae grows from a nearly spherical to ovoid underground bulb 1.1–2.8 cm in diameter, with rose-tinted flesh and enclosed in a brown papery tunic. From this bulb arise branched roots and, before flowering in autumn, the plant produces between four and nineteen narrow, grass-like leaves—typically eight to fifteen—each 18–20 cm long and about 1.5–2 mm wide at the base, which often shows a wine-red tint. One to three erect, leafless flowering stems (scapes), roughly 1.2 mm thick, reach 11–20 cm in height and bear six to twenty nodding flowers. Each flower is carried on a stalk (pedicel) 4–8 mm long during flowering, extending up to 3 cm as the fruit develops. The six pale violet perianth segments measure about 6–7.5 mm long and 2–2.6 mm wide, each with a green keel on the underside. The six stamens have linear violet filaments approximately 5 mm long and 1 mm wide at a white base. The ovoid ovary is violet, about 2–2.5 mm long and 1.5 mm wide, topped by a style 2–2.5 mm long, and develops into an oblong capsule roughly 4 mm long. When ripe, the capsule splits to release black seeds measuring 2–2.5 mm by 1 mm. Chromosome counts show a diploid number of 2n=28.

== Taxonomy ==
Prospero battagliae is a member of the family Asparagaceae within the autumn-flowering genus Prospero, which was segregated from Scilla based on detailed studies of morphology and chromosome numbers. It was formally described by Franz Speta in 2000 after Cretan populations were found to differ from related species in bulb size and shape, root branching, leaf length and basal pigmentation, as well as in floral and fruit characteristics. The holotype, collected on 20 May 1981 from Mesa Lasithi at about 860 m elevation, is preserved in the Biologiezentrum Linz herbarium.
