= Prospero hierapytnense =

Conservation status
- Data Deficient (IUCN 3.1)

Scientific classification
- Kingdom: Plantae
- Clade: Tracheophytes
- Clade: Angiosperms
- Clade: Monocots
- Order: Asparagales
- Family: Asparagaceae
- Subfamily: Scilloideae
- Genus: Prospero
- Species: P. hierapytnense

Binomial name
- Prospero hierapytnense Speta

Synonyms
- Scilla hierapytnense (Speta) Valdés

Species of flowering plant

Prospero hierapytnense is a flowering plant of the family Asparagaceae, subfamily Scilloideae that is endemic to Crete, Greece. This autumn-flowering plant produces nodding rosy-pink blooms on slender stems that emerge after its grass-like leaves appear. First collected in 1981 from the Kavousi Gorge in eastern Crete at elevations of 100–230 metres, it was formally recognized as a distinct species in 2000 and is distinct among its relatives for its unique chromosome count.

== Description ==
Prospero hierapytnense arises from a small, ovoid underground bulb 1.5–2 cm long and 0.9–2 cm wide, its flesh pale pink to white and enclosed in a brown papery tunic. From the base emerge branched roots and, in autumn before flowering, six to nine narrow, grass-like leaves up to 10–12 cm long and 1–2 mm wide.

When in bloom, one or two leafless flowering stems (scapes) 7–15 cm tall and about 1.2–1.5 mm thick carry between six and fourteen nodding flowers. Each flower has six rosy-pink perianth segments (the combined petals and sepals) measuring 5.5–6.5 mm by 2–2.5 mm. The stamens bear lance-shaped (lanceolate filaments 3–4 mm long, each arising from a white base. The ovoid ovary is violet-tinged, about 2 mm long and 1.6 mm wide, topped by a style 1.5–1.8 mm in length. After fertilisationthe plant produces a spherical seed capsule about 3 mm in diameter that contains black seeds roughly 1.6 mm long and 1.2 mm wide. Chromosome analysis indicates a diploid count of 2n=26.

== Taxonomy ==
Prospero hierapytnense belongs to the family Asparagaceae and is one of several autumn-flowering bulbous species placed in the genus Prospero, which was split from Scilla after detailed studies showed consistent distinctions in floral and bulb anatomy as well as chromosome numbers. It was formally described by the Austrian botanist Franz Speta in 2000 based on populations from Crete that differed from other Prospero species in bulb size, tunic colour and root branching, and was distinct for its comparatively high diploid chromosome count of 2n=26. The holotype was collected on 21 May 1981 from the Kavousi Gorge at 100–230 m elevation in eastern Crete and is preserved at the Biologiezentrum Linz herbarium.
