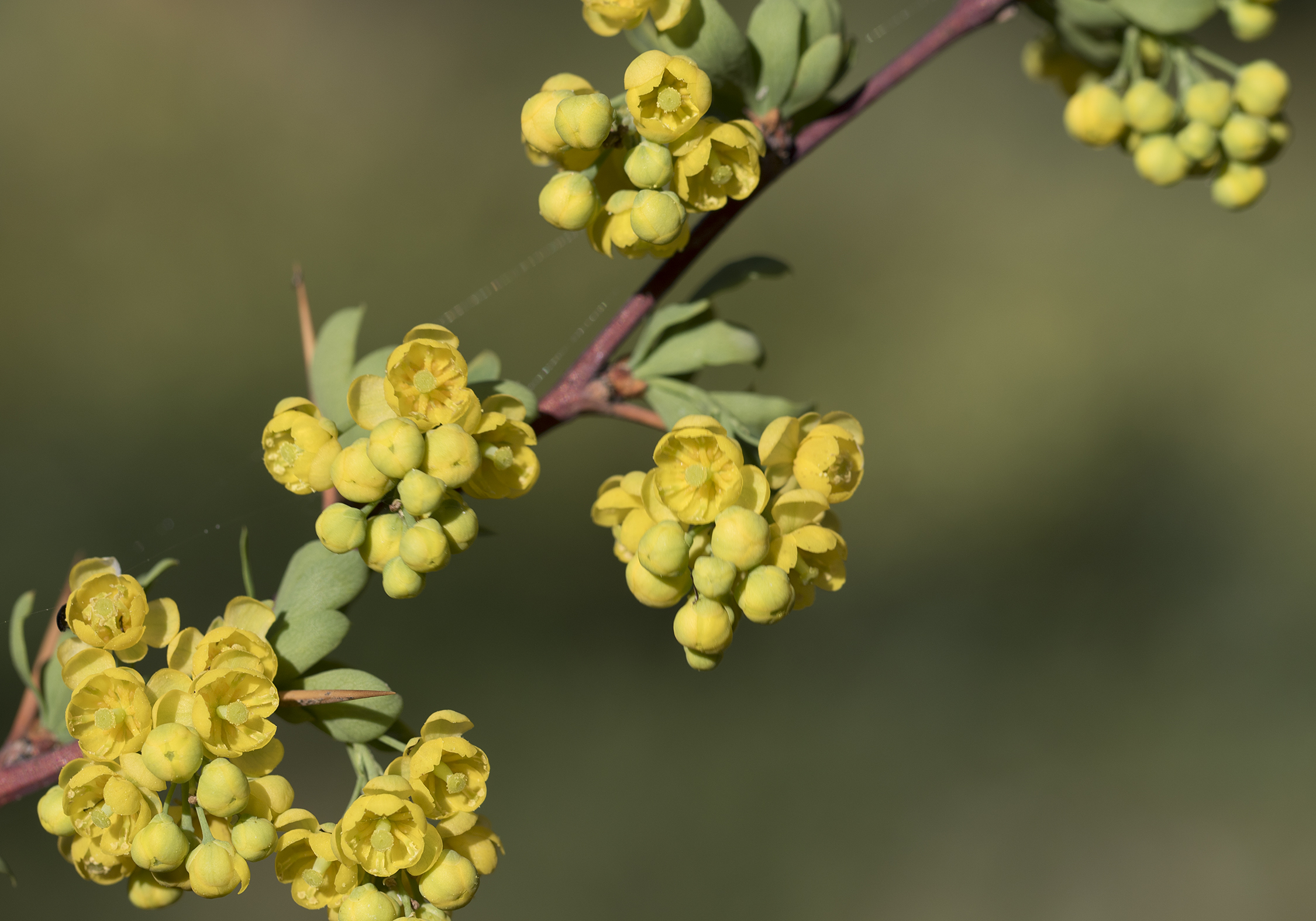

Scientific classification
- Kingdom: Plantae
- Clade: Tracheophytes
- Clade: Angiosperms
- Clade: Eudicots
- Order: Ranunculales
- Family: Berberidaceae
- Genus: Berberis
- Species: B. cretica

Binomial name
- Berberis cretica L. (1753)

Synonyms
- Berberis cretica var. serratifolia Poir. ex DC. (1821); Berberis sinensis var. cretica (L.) Regel (1873); Berberis vulgaris var. cretica (L.) Hook.f. & Thomson (1872)

= Berberis cretica =

Species of flowering plant

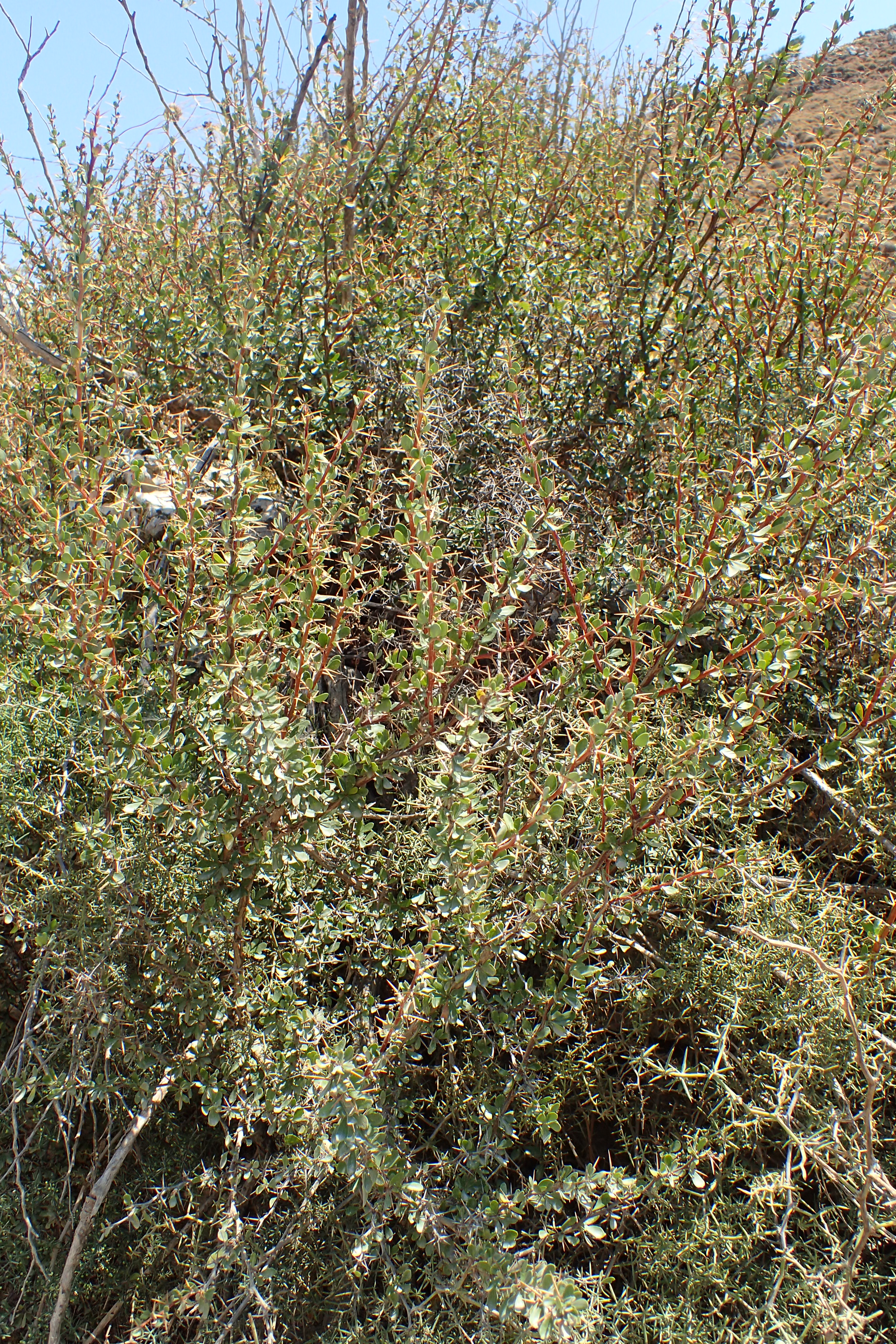
Berberis cretica on Crete

Berberis cretica is a species of flowering plant in the barberry family, Berberidaceae. It is a spiny shrub native to mainland Greece, Crete, the Aegean Islands, western and southwestern Turkey, and Cyprus.
