= Squill =

Squill is a common name for several lily-like plants and may refer to:

- Drimia maritima, medicinal plant native to the Mediterranean, formerly classified as Scilla maritima
- Scilla, a genus of plants cultivated for their ornamental flowers, native to Europe and Asia
- Puschkinia scilloides, a bulbous perennial resembling Scilla also cultivated for its ornamental flowers

It may also refer to

- SQL (Structured Query Language), used to manage databases.
