= Imbros Gorge =

Canyon in Crete, Greece

Coordinates: 35°14′48″N 24°10′5″E

Imbros Gorge (Greek: Φαράγγι Ίμπρου, Faragi Imbrou) is an 11 km long canyon located near Hora Sfakion in southern Crete, the Mediterranean island. It runs parallel to Samariá Gorge, its narrowest part has 1.60 m and it ends at the village of Kommitádes (8 km/ 650 m for hiking). The Imbros village (aka Nimbros) is located at an altitude of 780 meters and is at the South end of the fertile plain of Askyfou.

The legend tells that two brothers were banished from Imbros, Turkey and lived in the Imbros village, Crete.

The Imbros Gorge mule trail was the only connection between Chania and Hora Sfakion, before the road was built. Remains of this trail can be still seen. The gorge witnessed an evacuation of several thousand British soldiers during World War II before heading to Egypt.

Hiking:

- The entrance fee is €5.00 in 2026.
- You can pass the gorge all year round except when it's raining or snowing heavily.
- For those who reach Imbros with their own car, they can leave it there, pass the gorge and return to it with a taxi from Kommitádes or walk through the gorge all the way back again, as it is not so tiring.
- As one walks downhill 8 km and 650 m, it is something like half of Samariá Gorge. But Samariá Gorge is scree above the river bed, and Imbros Gorge is round scree of the dry creek bed. The Imbros Gorge is strenuous, proper shoes with ankle support should be worn.

== Gallery ==
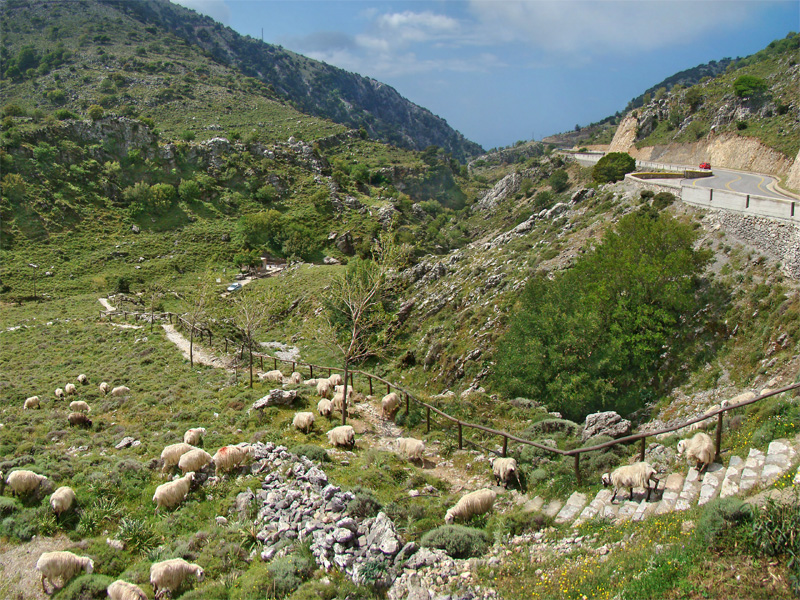
At the entrance

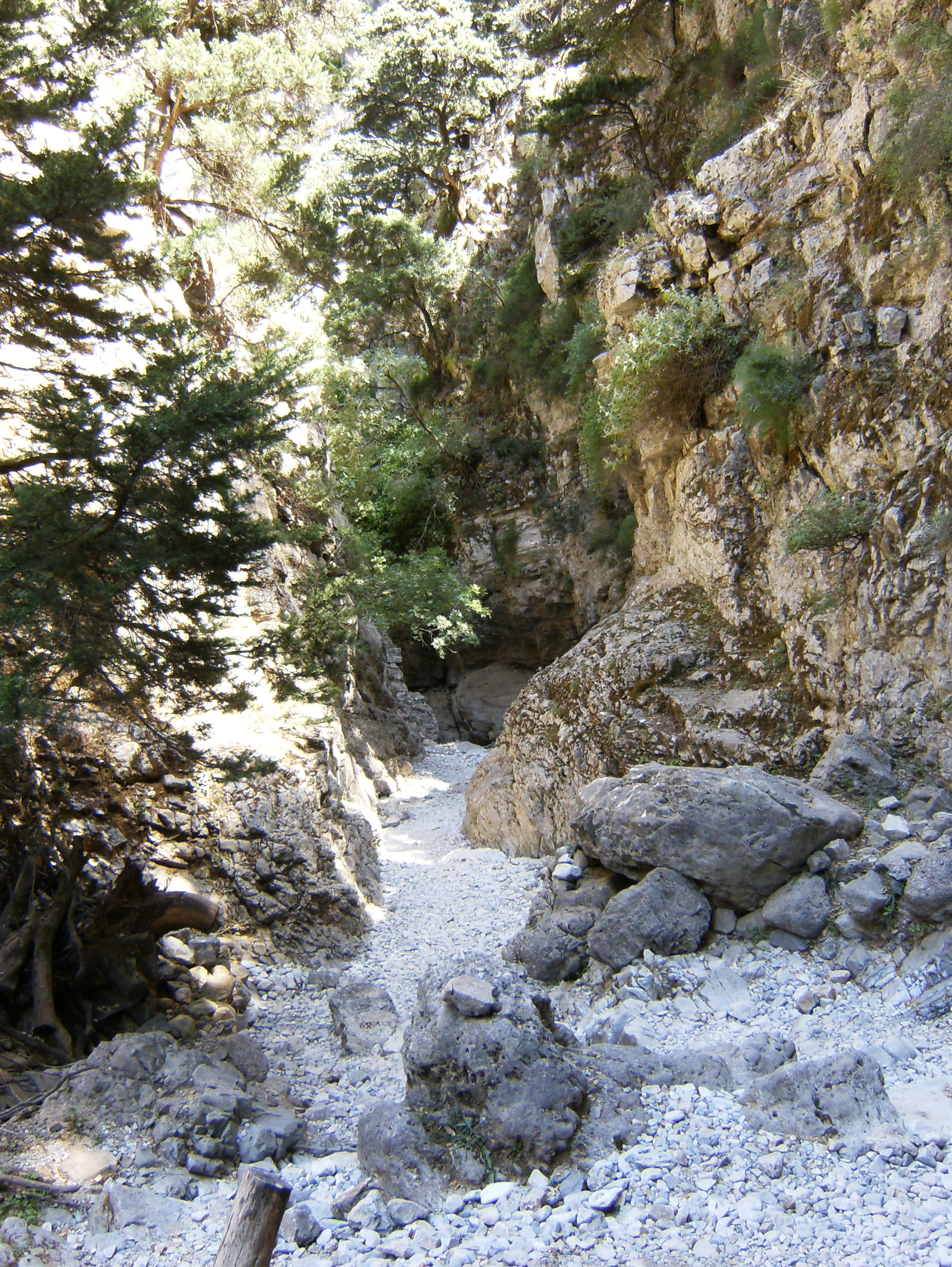
On the trail

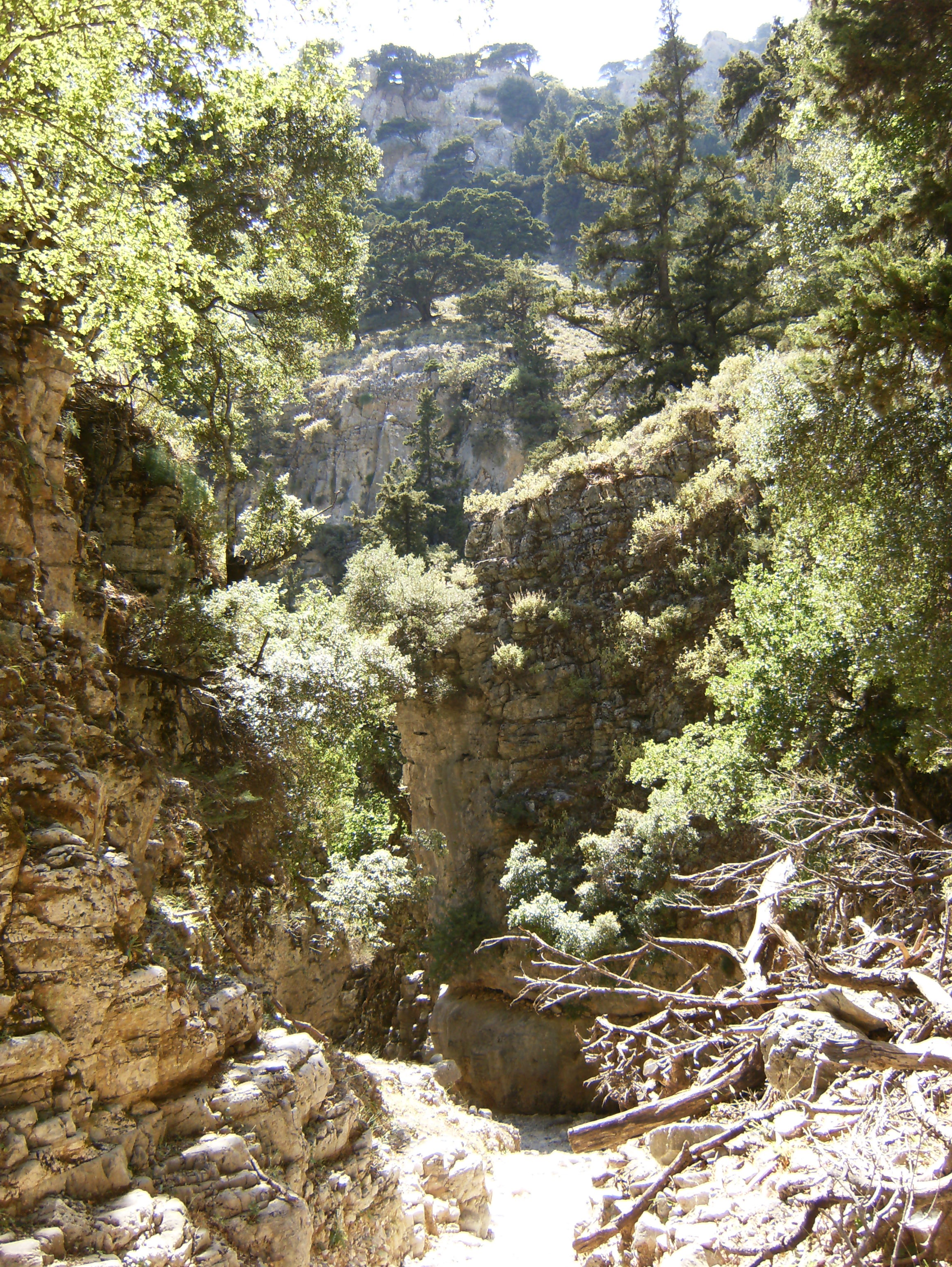
On the trail

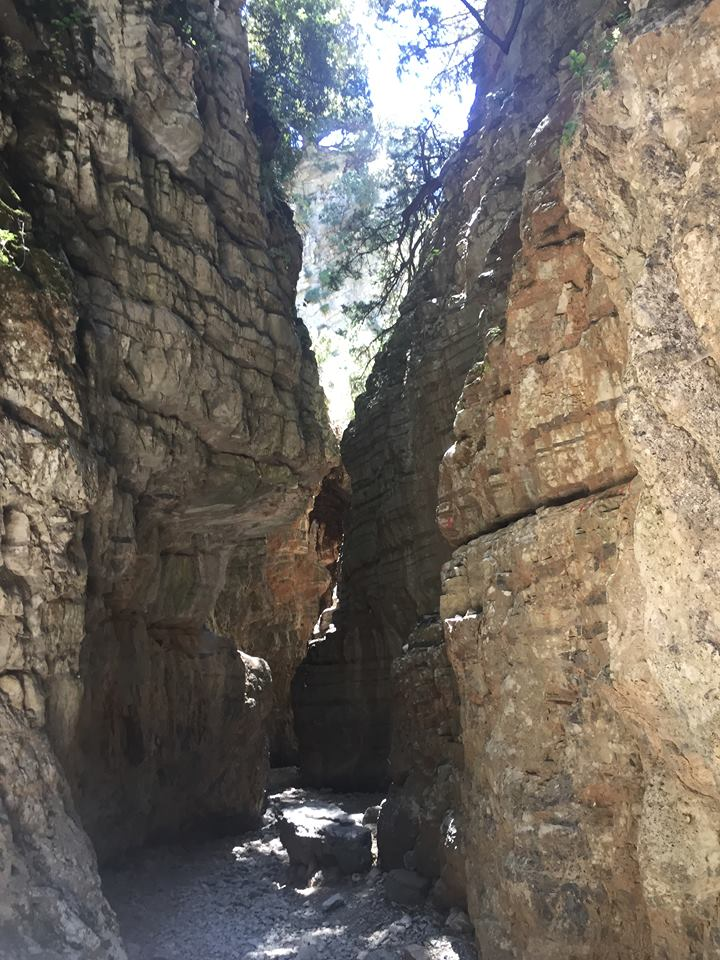
On the trail

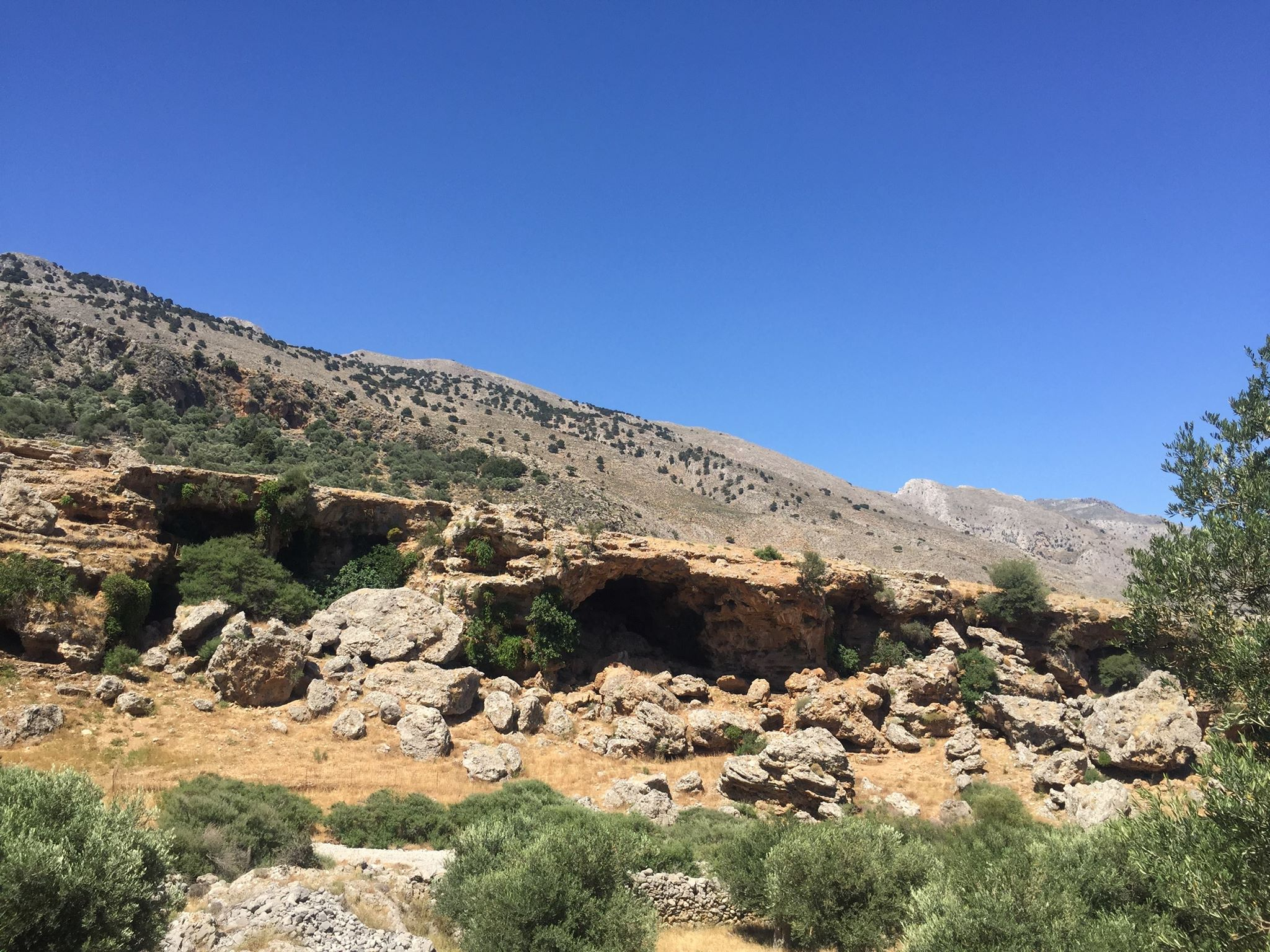
On the trail

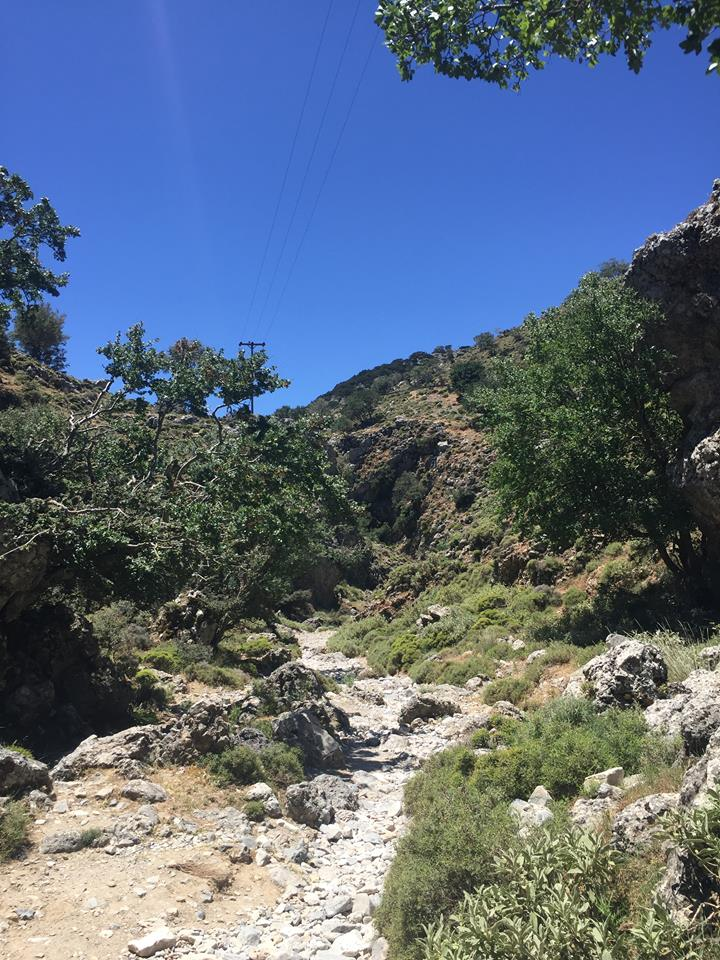
On the trail

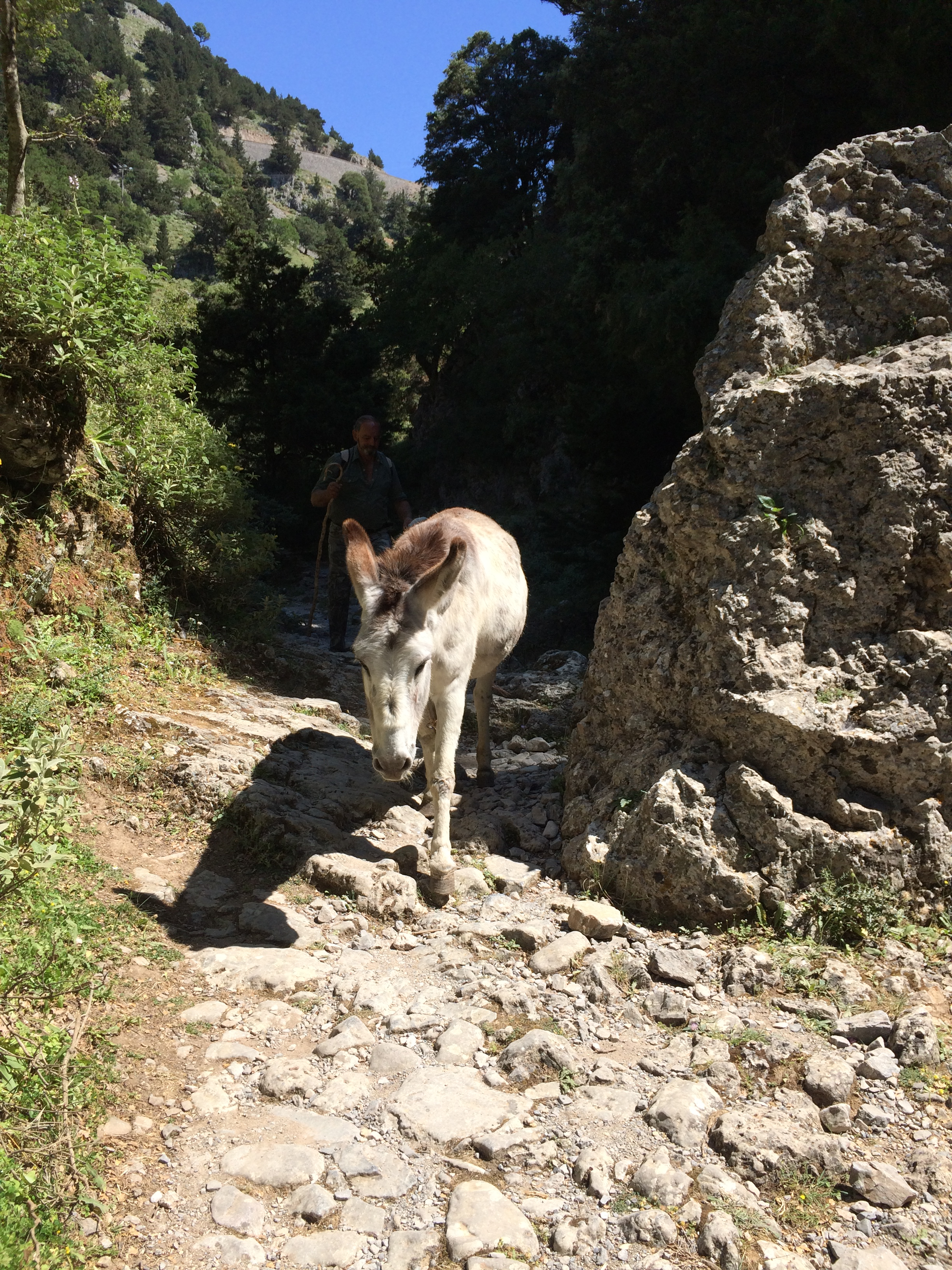
Mule on the trail
