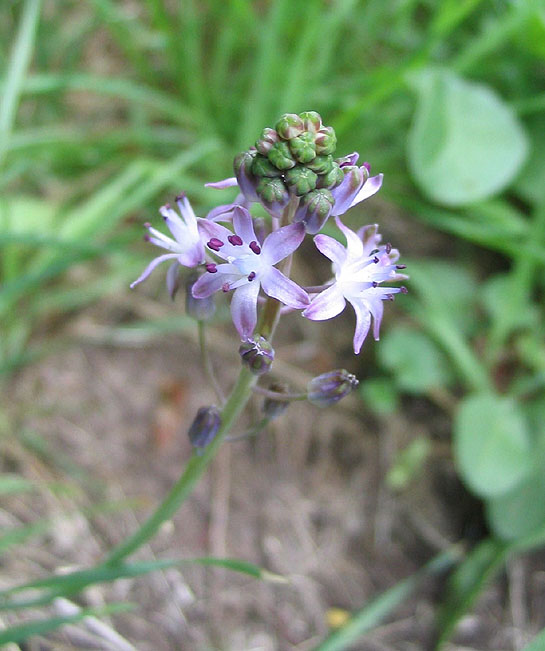

Scientific classification
- Kingdom: Plantae
- Clade: Tracheophytes
- Clade: Angiosperms
- Clade: Monocots
- Order: Asparagales
- Family: Asparagaceae
- Subfamily: Scilloideae
- Genus: Prospero
- Species: P. autumnale

Binomial name
- Prospero autumnale (L.) Speta

= Prospero autumnale =

Species of flowering plant

Prospero autumnale, the autumn squill, an autumnal flowering plant of the family Asparagaceae, subfamily Scilloideae, is found in the Mediterranean region from Portugal and Morocco east to Turkey and the Caucasus, plus Great Britain. Despite being classified as a single species, it is actually a cryptic species complex, with a variety of cytotypes having been discovered which are phenotypically indistinguishable from each other.

== Synonyms ==
- Scilla autumnalis L.
- Anthericum autumnale (L.) Scop.
- Ornithogalum autumnale (L.) Lam.
- Genlisa autumnalis (L.) Raf.
- Stellaris autumnalis (L.) Bubani
- Hyacinthus autumnalis (L.) E.H.L.Krause in J.Sturm
- Urginea autumnalis (L.) El-Gadi
- Scilla pulchella Munby
- Scilla gallica Tod.
- Scilla racemosa Balansa ex Baker
- Scilla dumetorum Balansa ex Baker
- Scilla longipes Batt. in J.A.Battandier & L.C.Trabut
- Scilla holzmannia Heldr.
- Scilla scythica Kleopow
- Prospero holzmannium (Heldr.) Speta
- Prospero pulchellum (Munby) Speta
- Prospero scythicum (Kleopow) Speta
- Scilla cyrenaica (Pamp.) G.M.Barroso & al.
- Prospero cyrenaicum (Pamp.) Speta

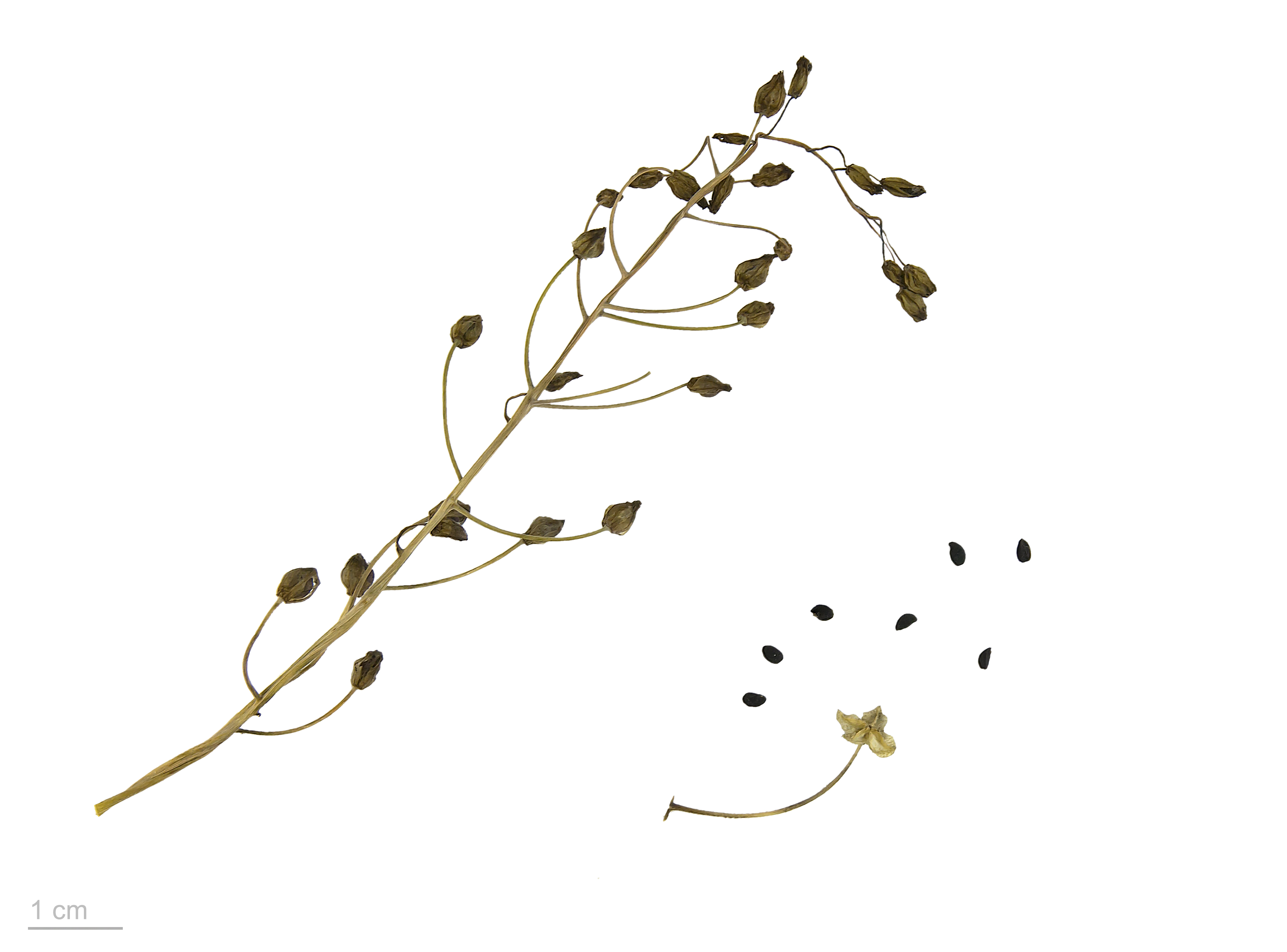
Prospero autumnale - MHNT
