= Franz Speta =

Austrian botanist

Franz Speta (22 December 1941 – 5 December 2015) was an Austrian botanist. He specialized in bulbous plants, especially the Hyacinthaceae. The standard author abbreviation Speta is used to indicate this person as the author when citing a botanical name.

== Career ==
Speta worked as an apprentice for a clerk. He then studied at the University of Vienna in the Department of Botany and Zoology. He wrote among professors such as Lothar Geitler and Tschermak Woess about the "evolution and karyology of elaiosomes to fruit and seeds." In 1972, he received a Ph.D.

From 1970, he was a research associate at the Upper Austrian Provincial Museum Linz, initially as Head of botany and invertebrates, from 1985 as director deputy of the National Museum and 1990 to 1991 as interim director. From 1993 to 2003 he was head of the newly founded Biology Centre of the National Museum.

In 1982, he received the venia legendi of Systematic Botany at the University of Salzburg. In 1994, he became the Councilor appointed.

== Research ==
The research focus of Speta was the bulbous plants, especially the Hyacinthaceae focusing Scilla and Ornithogalum. Other subjects are the tribes Antirrhineae the Scrophulariaceae, and Pinguicula (Lentibulariaceae). He has published about 100 scientific papers.

He also has approximately 50 biographical works, primarily about botany.
