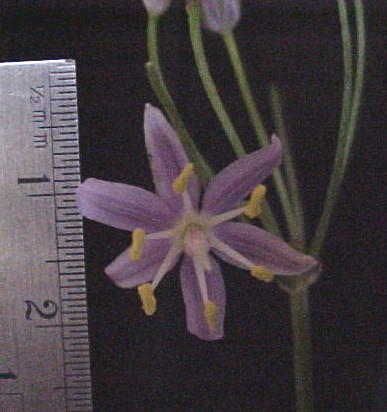
- Flower and umbel of Xochiquetzallia hannibalii with scale

Scientific classification
- Kingdom: Plantae
- Clade: Embryophytes
- Clade: Tracheophytes
- Clade: Angiosperms
- Clade: Monocots
- Order: Asparagales
- Family: Asparagaceae
- Subfamily: Brodiaeoideae
- Genus: Xochiquetzallia; J.Gut.

Type species
- Xochiquetzallia mortoniana (H.E. Moore) J.Gut.

= Xochiquetzallia =

Genus of flowering plants

Xochiquetzallia is a genus of geophytic flowering plants of the subfamily Brodiaeoideae in the family Asparagaceae. The genus contains four species: three previously classified within the genus Dandya and one other previously classified within Milla. Earlier genetic and morphological research had shown that the broad Milla clade of plants is made up of two sister lineages. The four plant species now within Xochiquetzallia make up one of these lineages, and are more closely related to each other than they are to the second lineage, which is made up of the remaining Milla species, Dandya purpusii, and the genera Behria, Bessera, Jaimehintonia and Petronymphe. Jorge Gutiérrez and Teresa Terrazas, two of the botanists who worked on the earlier research, followed up in 2020 with a paper formally transferring the four species from Dandya and Milla to Xochiquetzallia.

All four Xochiquetzallia species occur in Mexico's Río Balsas watershed, south of Mexico City.

== Description ==
Xochiquetzallia species are herbaceous perennials, growing from corms. They can be distinguished from related genera by the combination of two floral characteristics. The gynophore of a Xochiquetzallia flower lacks pith and the stigma is entire (undivided). Other genera in the Milla clade have pith in the gynophore and a divided stigma.

Plants in this genus are 20 to 60 cm (7.9 to 23.6 in) high from the base of the corm to the top of the flowerhead. Their roots are fibrous and sometimes fleshy, emerging from a corm in the shape of a flattened ball that is between 1.0 and 2.5 cm (0.39 and 0.98 in) in diameter. There are 5–9 narrow, dark-green leaves, each 20–49 cm (7.9–19.3 in) long from the blunt base to the acute tip. In cross-section they may be flattened or somewhat circular (terete). The surface may be smooth (glabrous) or scaly (scabrous), with translucent projections along the leaf veins. The lower portions of the leaves arising from the corm form a brown tunic that surrounds the base of the scape (flower stalk) for up to 2.0 cm.

The inflorescence is in the form of an umbel on top of a scape that is generally 20–50 cm (7.9–19.7 in) long. This scape is cylindrical, usually shorter than the leaves, with a surface that is smooth with occasional acute prominences. Below the umbel there are 2–3 narrowly triangular bracts 3.0–9.0 mm long. There is also a single bracteole below each of the 4–20 flowers. The flowers are borne on pedicels 0.8–3.5 cm long arising from the top of the scape. In form they are either subcampanulate (broadly bell-shaped) or hypocrateriform (shaped like a salver on top of a narrow tube) and they are either held erect or droop somewhat from the tip of the pedicel.

Flowers of Xochiquetzallia species are white or blue. Each begins with a tube (where the tepals are fused) that is 1–25 mm long. Like all lilioid monocots, the flowers have six tepals, arranged in two groups of three. Each outer tepal is elliptic in shape with a narrowing base, acute tip and 1–3 veins; these outer tepals measure 8.0–16.0 mm long and 2.0–7.0 mm wide. The inner three tepals are similar, but sometimes more broadly elliptical and with more obtuse tips; these inner tepals measure 8.0–16.0 mm long and 3.0–11.0 mm wide. The flower has six separate fertile stamens, each arising from a corresponding tepal near the throat of the floral tube. The stamen filaments are typically 2.0–5.0 mm long and may be thread-like or widen somewhat toward the base. Each of the six yellow anthers is 1.0–2.5 mm long and is basifixed (attached by its base to the stamen filament). The anthers taper towards the tip and sometimes towards the base as well.

Among the female parts of the flower, the gynophore is 0.8–1.6 mm long. The ovary is cylindrical, 1.0–5.0 mm long, and fused at its base to the flower's perigone. Above this is a threadlike style 1.8–7.0 mm long bearing an undivided stigma with a bumpy surface. The fruit forms as a roughly ball-shaped or cylindrical, smooth-surfaced, brown, three-sided capsule 6.0–13.0 mm long. The capsule is loculicidal, meaning that when ripe it splits apart along the middle of each compartment. Inside are shiny black oblong or sickle-shaped seeds with a bumpy surface that are about 4.0 × 1.5 mm in size.

== Taxonomy ==
=== Etymology ===
Gutiérrez and Terrazas named the new genus for the Aztec goddess of flowers, Xōchiquetzal. Xṓchitl means 'flower' in Nahuatl and quétzalli refers literally to the tail feathers of the quetzal bird, but also means 'precious'. Gutiérrez and Terrazas translate the combined word as 'beautiful flower'.

=== Phylogeny and classification ===
Xochiquetzallia is one of 14 genera in the Brodiaeoideae subfamily within the Asparagaceae family of monocots. Within Brodiaeoideae, Xochiquetzallia is one of six genera in the Milla clade, which is centered in Mexico.

The Milla clade is estimated to have arisen approximately 15.8 million years ago in the California Floristic Province, separating from the lineage that gave rise to the other eight genera within Brodiaeoideae. From California, the Milla clade dispersed south and east to the Chihuahuan–Coahuila Plateaus and the Trans-Mexican Volcanic Belt and subsequently to Baja California and the Sierra Madre del Sur.

Gutiérrez and Terrazas selected Xochiquetzallia mortoniana as the type species for the new genus.

=== Species ===
Gutiérrez and Terrazas transferred the following four species to the new genus:

- Xochiquetzallia balsensis (López-Ferr. & Espejo) J.Gut.
- Xochiquetzallia hannibalii (L.W. Lenz) J.Gut.
- Xochiquetzallia mortoniana (H.E. Moore) J.Gut.
- Xochiquetzallia thadhowardii (L.W. Lenz) J.Gut.

== Distribution and habitat ==
The four species in Xochiquetzallia are all native to the broad Río Balsas valley in south-central Mexico. There are relatively few occurrence records for all four species.

Specimen records indicate that X. mortoniana and X. hannibalii grow in the lower reaches of the Río Balsas valley, in the states of Michoacán and Guerrero.

X. mortoniana was originally collected on the edge of cliffs at 1400 m elevation at Tierras Blancas, in Mina district of Guerrero. Additional populations have been reported from lower down the valley in Michoacán.

X. hannibalii was originally recorded growing singly (rather than in clumps) in full sun and very light shade in gritty red soil on dry rocky hillsides facing west, in short grass near giant cacti.

X. thadhowardii appears to be found further up the Río Balsas, at the Guerrero/Michoacán border and further east. The species was originally recorded in large colonies in part shade and full sun on hillsides with calcareous soil, growing under thorny shrubs and giant Neobuxbaumia tetetzo cacti.

X. balsensis has been recorded only from tropical deciduous forest and thorn scrub above the Amacuzac River (a tributary of the Río Balsas) in Tlaquiltenango, Morelos, at an elevation of around 1,200 m (3,900 ft).

The distribution of X. thadhowardii and X. balsensis was originally thought to overlap and the two species are morphologically similar. When X. balsensis was described in 1992 (under the name Dandya balsensis), it was distinguished from the species now named X. thadhowardii based on a smaller perigone, shorter filaments and style, and free anthers (whereas X. thadhowardii has connate anthers fused around the style). Later studies by Gutiérrez and collaborators suggested that there were no morphological or anatomical differences between the two species. Subsequent analysis did show that one population of X. balsensis, from an upland area in the state of Morelos, can be distinguished from X. thadhowardii. X. balsensis is now recognized to also have flowers with connate anthers, which separate during advanced anthesis. Instead, the species is now distinguished by filaments no longer than 3 mm and style segments less than or equal to 4 mm long.

== Uses ==
All species of Xochiquetzallia are rare and none of them is commonly available in the horticultural trade. They are occasionally grown in botanical gardens.

== Sources ==
- Gándara, Etelvina; Specht, Chelsea D.; Sosa, Victoria (2014). "Origin and diversification of the Milla clade (Brodiaeoideae. Asparagaceae): A Neotropical group of six geophytic genera". Molecular Phylogenetics and Evolution. 75: 118–125. Bibcode:2014MolPE..75..118G. doi:10.1016/j.ympev.2014.02.014. PMID 24594063.
- Govaerts, R., ed. (2022). "Xochiquetzallia". International Plant Names Index. The Royal Botanic Gardens, Kew, Harvard University Herbaria & Libraries and Australian National Botanic Gardens.
- Gutiérrez, Jorge (2009). Sistemática del género Dandya H.E. Moore (Themidaceae) [Systematics of the genus Dandya H.E. Moore (Themidaceae)] (MSc) (in Spanish). Colegio de Postgraduados, México.
- Gutiérrez, Jorge; Terrazas, Teresa; Hernández-Sandoval, L.; Martínez-Cabrera, D. (2010). "Anatomía floral de los géneros del complejo Milla (Themidaceae)" [Floral anatomy of the genera of the Milla complex (Themidaceae)]. Boletín de la Sociedad Botánica de México (in Spanish). 87: 1–12.
- Gutiérrez, Jorge; Salgado, J.; Grego-Valencia, D; Terrazas, Teresa (2015). "Morfología y anatomía foliar de los géneros del clado Milla (Themidaceae)" [Morphology and foliar anatomy of the genera of the Milla clade (Themidaceae)]. Revista Mexicana de Biodiversidad (in Spanish). 86 (3): 652–660. doi:10.1016/j.rmb.2015.06.008.
- Gutiérrez, Jorge; Terrazas, Teresa; Luna-Vega, Isolda; Salazar, Gerardo A. (November 2017). "Phylogenetic analyses of the Milla complex (Brodiaeoideae: Asparagaceae), with an emphasis on Milla". Botanical Journal of the Linnean Society. 185 (4): 445–462. doi:10.1093/botlinnean/box074.
- Gutiérrez, Jorge; Terrazas, Teresa (27 January 2020). "Xochiquetzallia (Asparagaceae, Brodiaeoideae), a new genus segregated from the paraphyletic Dandya". PhytoKeys (139): 39–49. doi:10.3897/phytokeys.139.46890. PMC 6997253. PMID 32042249.
- Lenz, Lee W. (1971). "Two New Species of Dandya (Liliaceae) from Mexico and a Reexamination of Bessera and Behria". Aliso: A Journal of Systematic and Floristic Botany. 7 (3): 313–320. doi:10.5642/aliso.19710703.03.
- López-Ferrari, Ana Rosa; Espejo Serna, Adolfo (1992). "Una nueva especie de Dandya (Alliaceae) de la cuenca del río Balsas, México" [A new species of Dandya (Alliaceae) from the Río Balsas Basin, Mexico]. Acta Botanica Mexicana (in Spanish). 18 (18): 11–15. doi:10.21829/abm18.1992.638.
- Moore, H.E. (1953). "The genus Milla (Amaryllidaceae–Allieae) and its allies". Gentes Herbarum. 8 (4): 262–293.
