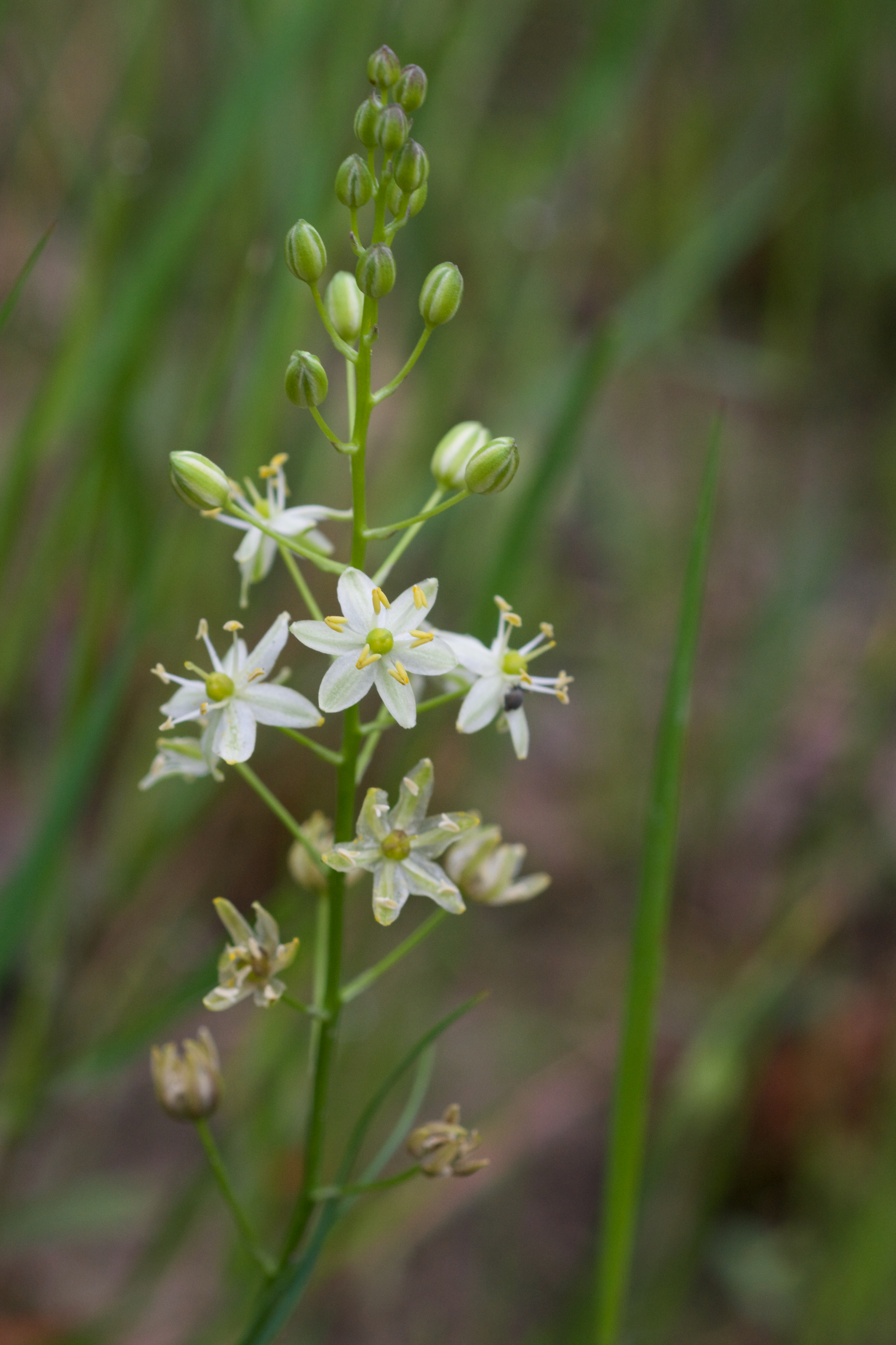

Scientific classification
- Kingdom: Plantae
- Clade: Tracheophytes
- Clade: Angiosperms
- Clade: Monocots
- Order: Asparagales
- Family: Asparagaceae
- Subfamily: Agavoideae
- Genus: Schoenolirion
- Species: S. wrightii

Binomial name
- Schoenolirion wrightii Sherman

= Schoenolirion wrightii =

Species of flowering plant

Schoenolirion wrightii, known as Texas sunnybell, is a species of flowering plant in the Agave subfamily. It is native to the southern United States, in Texas, Louisiana, Arkansas, and Alabama. Texas sunnybell produces vertical rootstocks topped with prominent bulbs, each up to 17 mm (0.67 in) in diameter. Between two and seven leaves are produced per plant, up to 34 cm (13 in) long and only 6 mm (0.24 in) across each, flattened to slightly keeled and usually shorter than the flowerhead. The ovate to lanceolate tepals are white with a green stripe on the back, mostly three-veined, but sometimes five-veined. Schoenolirion wrightii flowers between March and May, occurring in sandstone outcrops, wet pinelands, and boggy places.
