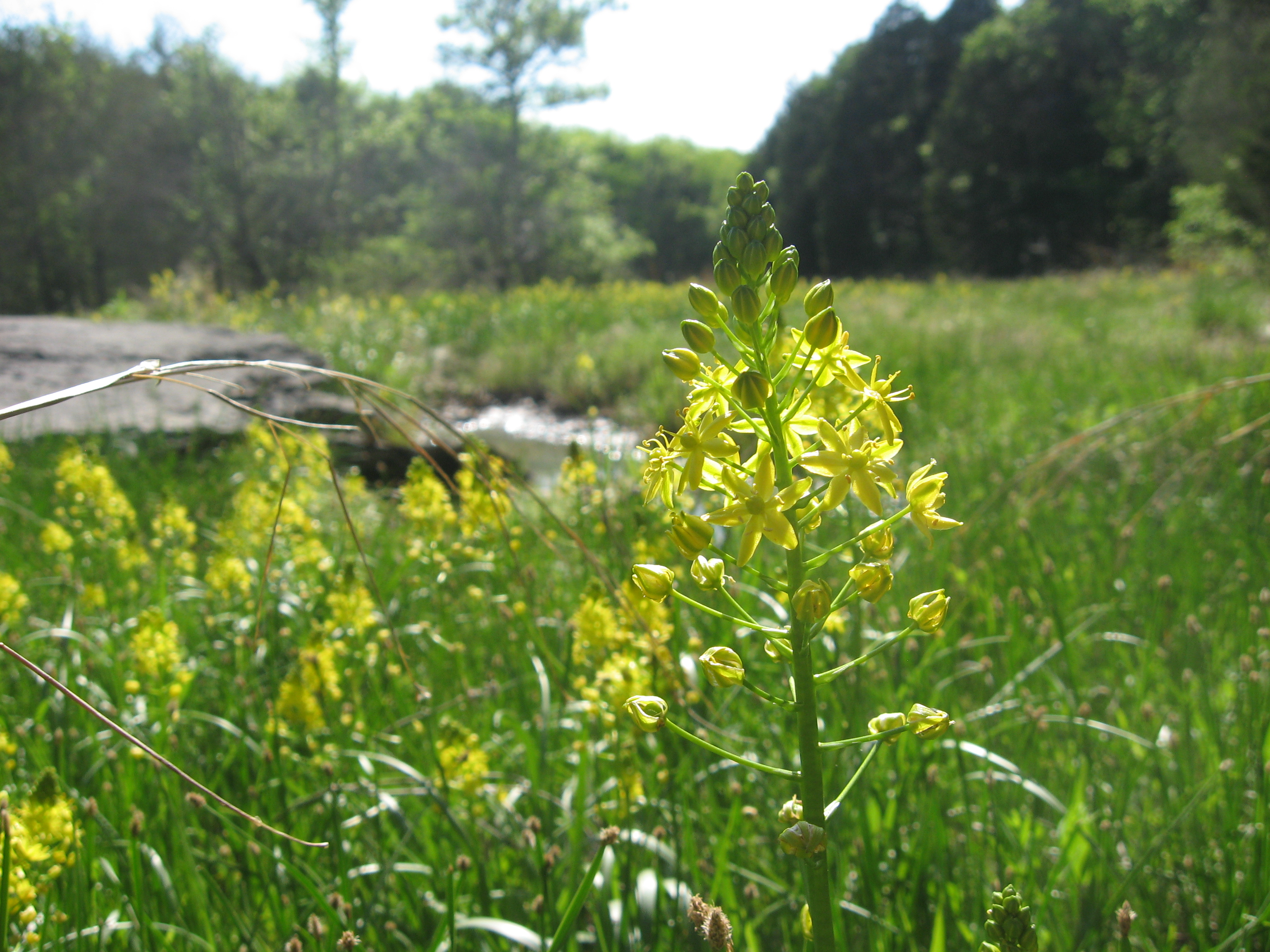

Scientific classification
- Kingdom: Plantae
- Clade: Tracheophytes
- Clade: Angiosperms
- Clade: Monocots
- Order: Asparagales
- Family: Asparagaceae
- Subfamily: Agavoideae
- Genus: Schoenolirion
- Species: S. croceum

Binomial name
- Schoenolirion croceum (Michx.) Alph. Wood

= Schoenolirion croceum =

Species of flowering plant

Schoenolirion croceum, known by the common names yellow sunnybell, sunnybells and swamp candle, is a species of flowering plant in the Agave subfamily. It is native to the Southeastern United States from Texas to North Carolina. It is found on moist rock outcrops, in wet pinelands and in habitats that are very wet in the spring but dry in the summer. In middle Tennessee, it is found in fen-like areas in cedar glades, fed by spring water. Further south, it inhabits wet pine savannas and bogs.

It produces yellow flowers in the spring.
