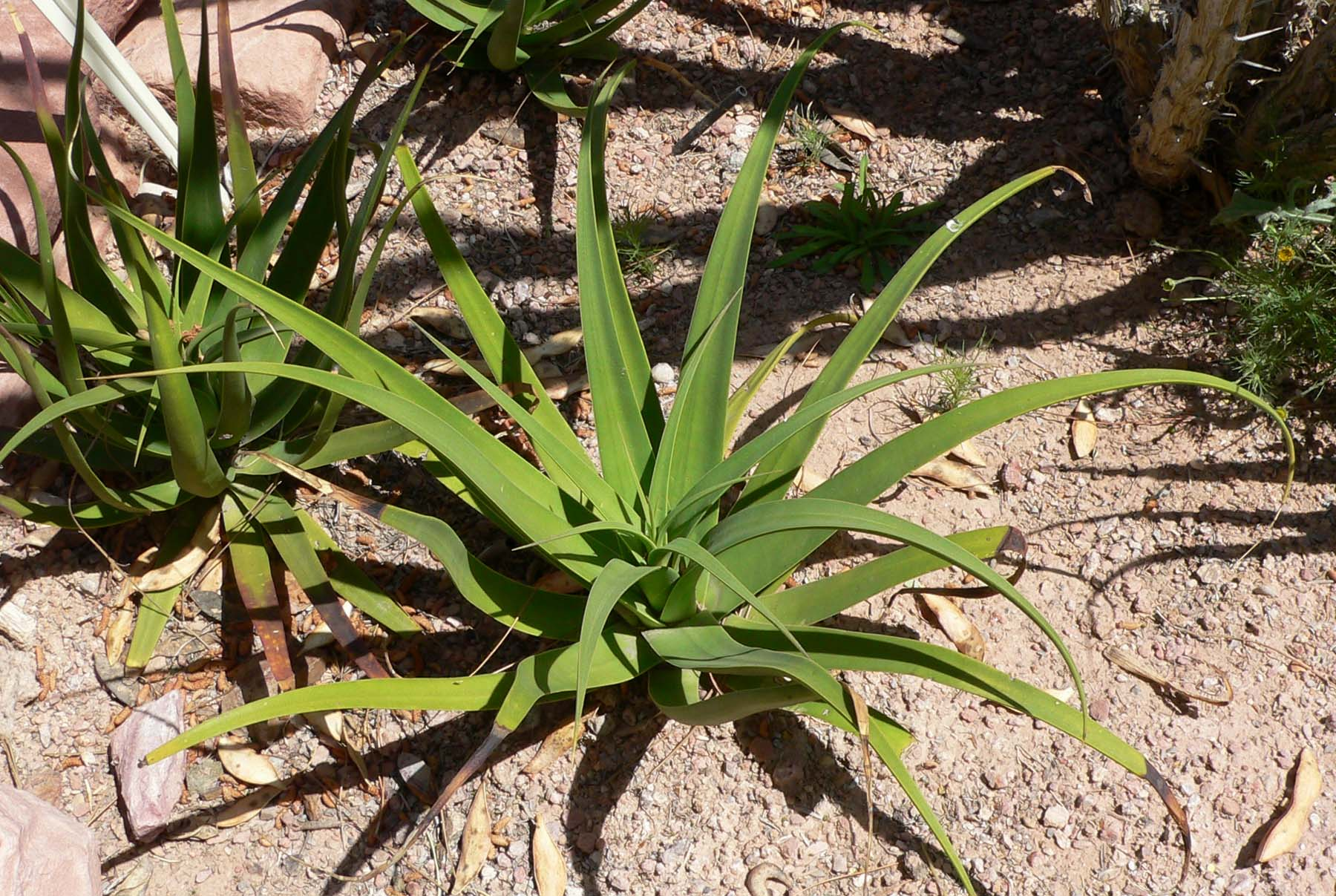

Conservation status
- Least Concern (IUCN 3.1)

Scientific classification
- Kingdom: Plantae
- Clade: Embryophytes
- Clade: Tracheophytes
- Clade: Spermatophytes
- Clade: Angiosperms
- Clade: Monocots
- Order: Asparagales
- Family: Asparagaceae
- Subfamily: Agavoideae
- Genus: Paleoagave; A.Vázquez, Rosales & García-Mor.
- Species: P. bracteosa

Binomial name
- Paleoagave bracteosa (S.Watson ex Engelm.) A.Vázquez, Rosales & García-Mor.

Synonyms
- Agave bracteosa S.Watson ex Engelm.

= Paleoagave =

Species of flowering plant

Paleoagave is a genus of flowering plants in the family Asparagaceae. It includes a single species, Paleoagave bracteosa (synonym Agave bracteosa) which commonly known as spider agave or squid agave. It is native to the Sierra Madre Oriental of northeastern Mexico (spanning the states of Tamaulipas, Coahuila and Nuevo León).

== Description ==
Small among the agaves, its green and succulent leaves are long and lanceolate, 50–70 cm long and 3–5 cm at the base, where they are the widest. Compared to the larger, more formidable agaves, they have minute serrations (teeth) along the margins but neither teeth, nor terminal spine, at the leaf tip. The leaves have a tendency to curl somewhat, in a fashion reminiscent of the octopus agave A. vilmoriniana. The inflorescence spike is also short, at 1.2–1.7 meters, and its upper-third is densely covered with white or pale-yellow flowers. The flowers are distinctive, in that tepals arise from a disk-shaped receptacle rather than the usual tube. The stamens are quite long.

== Taxonomy ==
The species was first described as Agave bracteosa by Sereno Watson in 1882, and placed in the large genus Agave. Gentry defined a group "Choritepalae" that includes A. bracteosa along with Agave ellemeetiana and Agave guiengola, and states that the discoid receptacle and unarmed leaves are different enough from other agaves to justify placing A. bracteosa and A. ellemeetiana into a separate genus, but the characteristics of A. guiengola link the group to the rest of Agave.

== Distribution and habitat ==
It grows in well-drained and bright but shaded or protected locations, such as under trees or on cliffs or rocky slopes (facing away from the sun). The species can be found growing between 900 and 1700 meters elevation (from 2,950' ft. up to nearly 5,500') above sea level.

== Conservation ==
Although it occupies a small range, it is not considered to be threatened.
