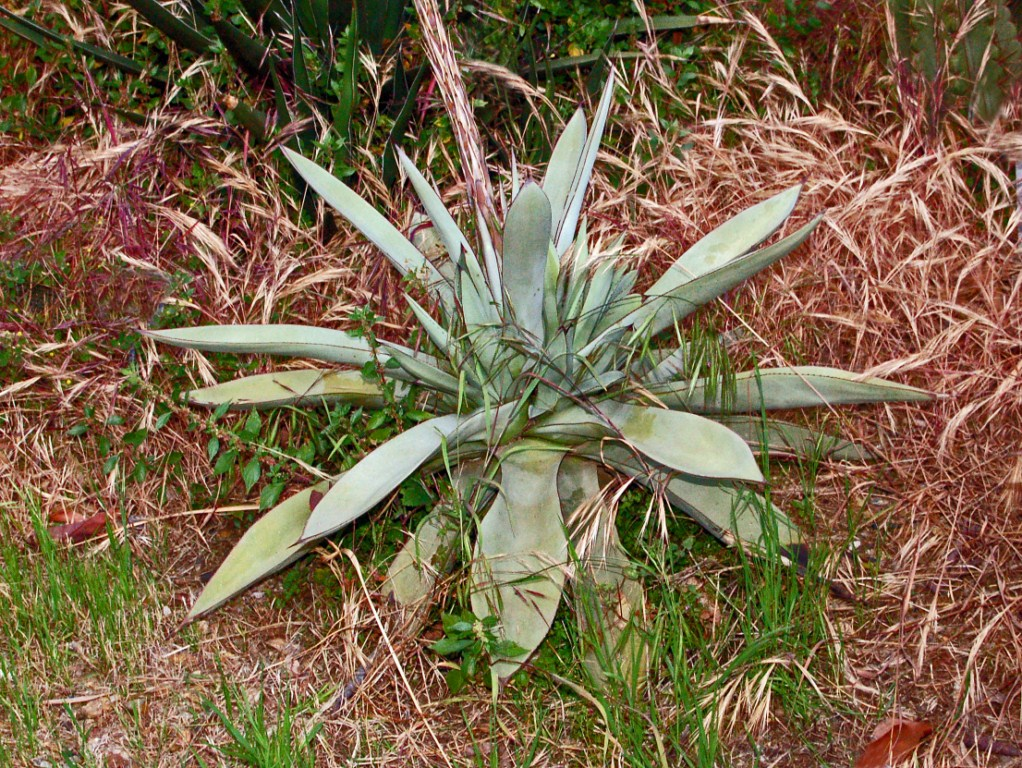
- A. guiengola at the botanical garden of Villa Durazzo-Pallavicini, Genova Pegli

Conservation status
- Endangered (IUCN 3.1)

Scientific classification
- Kingdom: Plantae
- Clade: Tracheophytes
- Clade: Angiosperms
- Clade: Monocots
- Order: Asparagales
- Family: Asparagaceae
- Subfamily: Agavoideae
- Genus: Agave
- Species: A. guiengola

Binomial name
- Agave guiengola Gentry

= Agave guiengola =

Species of flowering plant

Agave guiengola is a large, evergreen succulent flowering plant belonging to the family Asparagaceae, and is endemic to the State of Oaxaca, in southern Mexico. It grows on limestone slopes at an elevation between 100–1,000 metres (330–3,280 ft) above sea level. The species name guiengola refers to Cerro Guiengola, the mountain where the species was first discovered.

== Description ==
Agave guiengola reach a diameter of 30–40 centimetres (12–16 in). The leaves are thick, broad, whitish-green to bluish-colored, ovate to lanceolate, irregularly arranged, about 57 centimetres (22 in) long and 13–15 centimetres (5.1–5.9 in) wide. The dark brown margins of the leaves are densely toothed. The year-old slender inflorescence is 2–3 metres (6 ft 7 in – 9 ft 10 in) high in nature, though heights exceeding 6.25 metres (20.5 ft) have been observed in botanical gardens outside of its native habitat. The pale yellow to white colored flowers are 33–35 millimetres (1.3–1.4 in) long and appear in clumps near the base. The fruits are elongated, brown capsules 22–24 millimetres (0.87–0.94 in) long. The flowering period extends from February to March.
