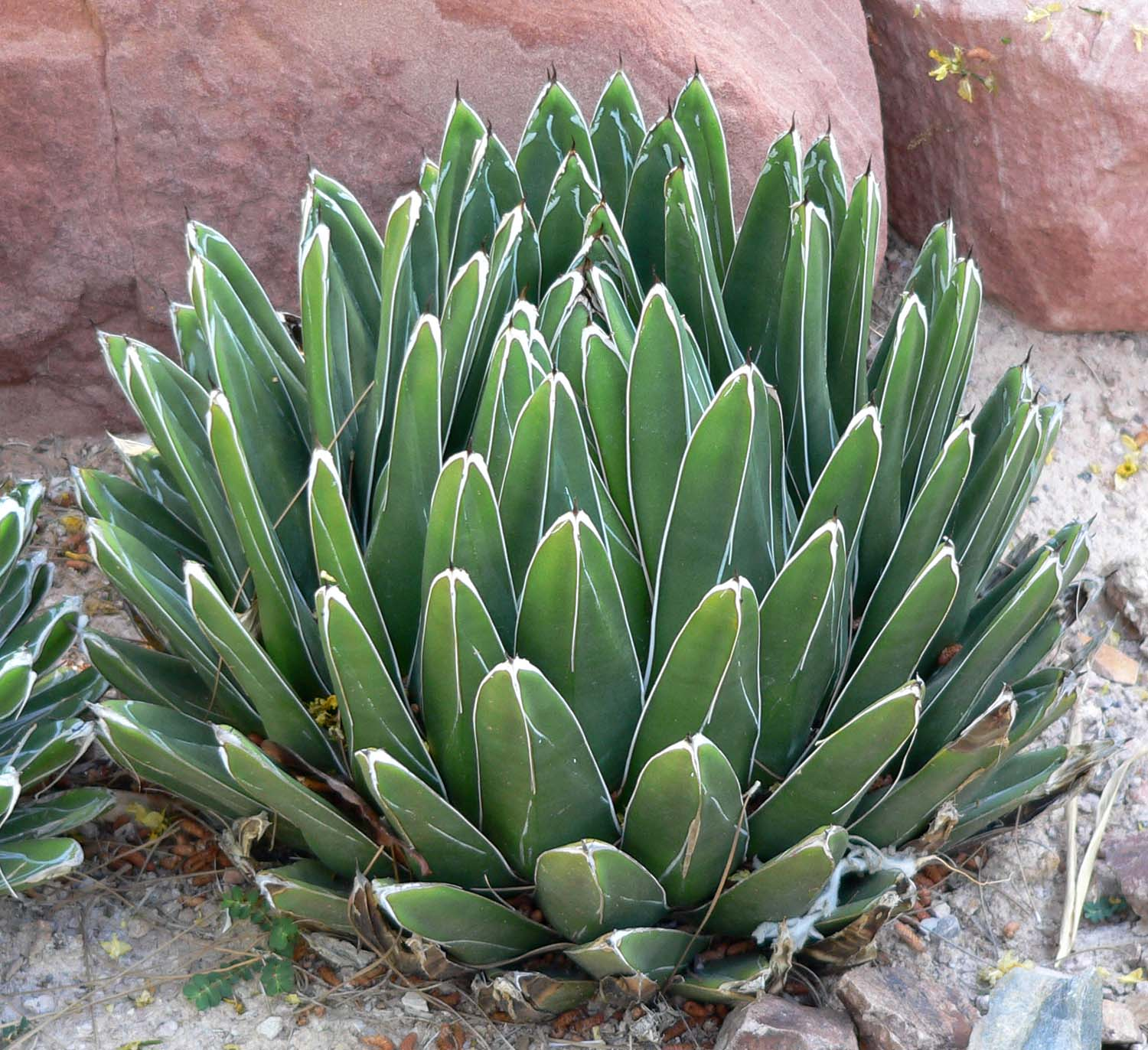

Conservation status
- Least Concern (IUCN 3.1)
- CITES Appendix II

Scientific classification
- Kingdom: Plantae
- Clade: Tracheophytes
- Clade: Angiosperms
- Clade: Monocots
- Order: Asparagales
- Family: Asparagaceae
- Subfamily: Agavoideae
- Genus: Agave
- Species: A. victoriae-reginae

Binomial name
- Agave victoriae-reginae T. Moore (1875)

Synonyms
- Agave consideranti Carrière; Agave ferdinandi-regis A. Berger; Agave nickelsii Gosselin; Agave victoriae-reginae f. dentata Breitung; Agave victoriae-reginae f. latifolia Breitung; Agave victoriae-reginae f. longifolia Breitung; Agave victoriae-reginae f. longispina Breitung; Agave victoriae-reginae f. nickelsii Trel.; Agave victoriae-reginae f. ornata Breitung; Agave victoriae-reginae f. stolonifera Jacobson

= Agave victoriae-reginae =

Queen Victoria's agave

Species of flowering plant

Agave victoriae-reginae is a species of flowering plant in the family Asparagaceae. It is sometimes referred to by the common names Queen Victoria Agave or Royal Agave. The specific epithet is in honor of Queen Victoria. It is a small succulent, perennial plant, noted for its streaks of white on sculptured geometrical leaves, and popular as an ornamental.

This agave is highly variable in form, but in general the rosettes are small and compact, growing to 0.5m, composed of short, rigid, thick leaves that are green with a pattern of distinctive white markings. The markings are generally along leaf keels or margins, giving a sort of polyhedral appearance. Marginal teeth are usually lacking, while the terminus of the leaf may include 1 to 3 spines, each 1.5–3 cm in length. Cream coloured flowers are borne in erect racemes up to 4m in length.

A. victoriae-reginae is found in the Chihuahuan Desert in the Mexican States of Coahuila, Durango and Nuevo León, with about a half-dozen subspecies named. The situation is complicated by hybrids with a number of other agave species. Although it faces some local threats, the population of the species as a whole is stable, and it is not considered by the IUCN to be threatened.

It is cold-hardy as agaves go, and thus finds favor as a small accent in many northerly gardens. However it is recommended in the UK that this plant be kept in heated conditions under glass during winter. It has gained the Royal Horticultural Society's Award of Garden Merit. When grown as a houseplant, it is best planted in a very porous, sandy soil and given direct sunlight or bright shade. The soil should be permitted to dry out between waterings. The plant need only be repotted about every two to three years. Propagation is normally by seed, since the plant rarely produces basal shoots.

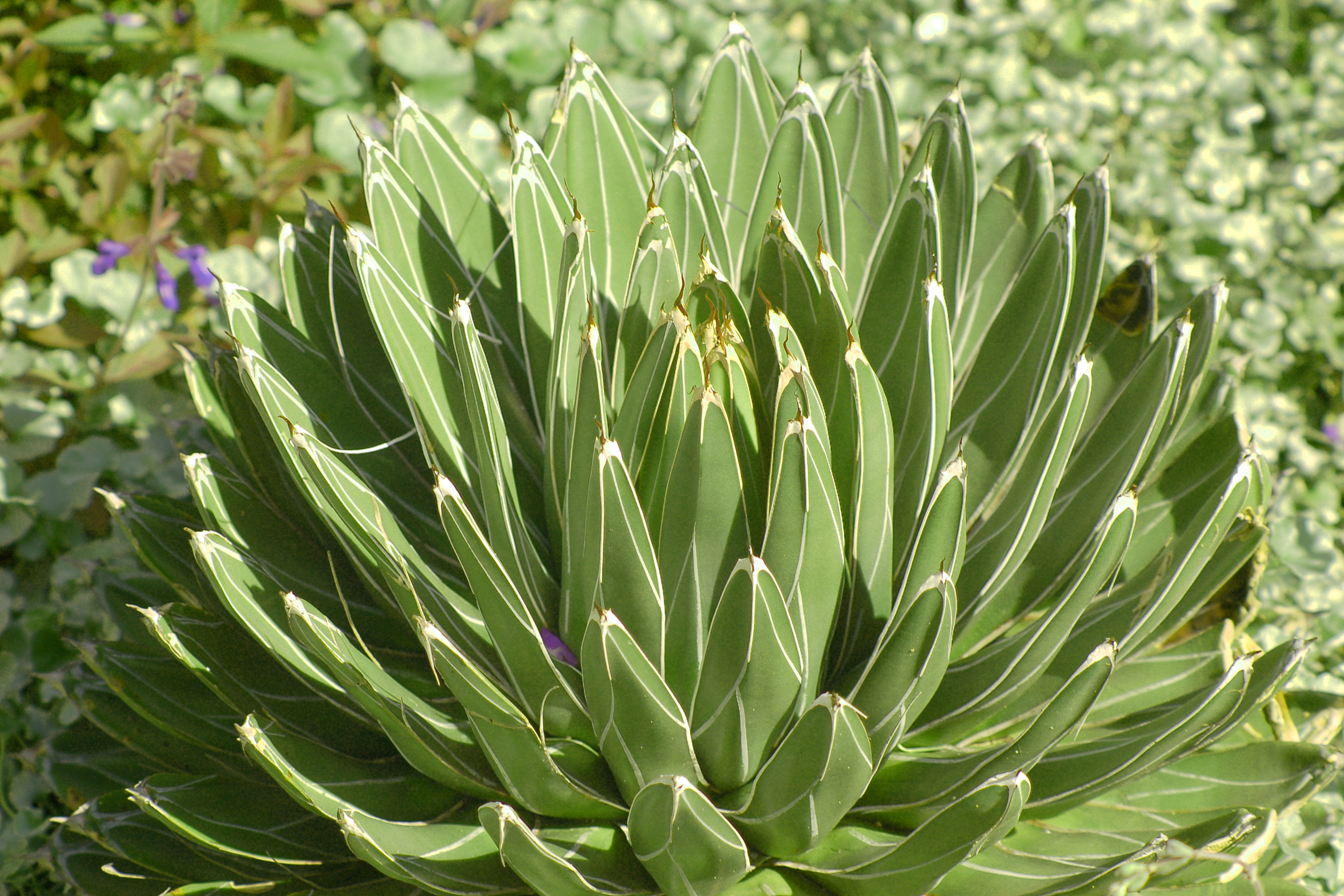
Plant

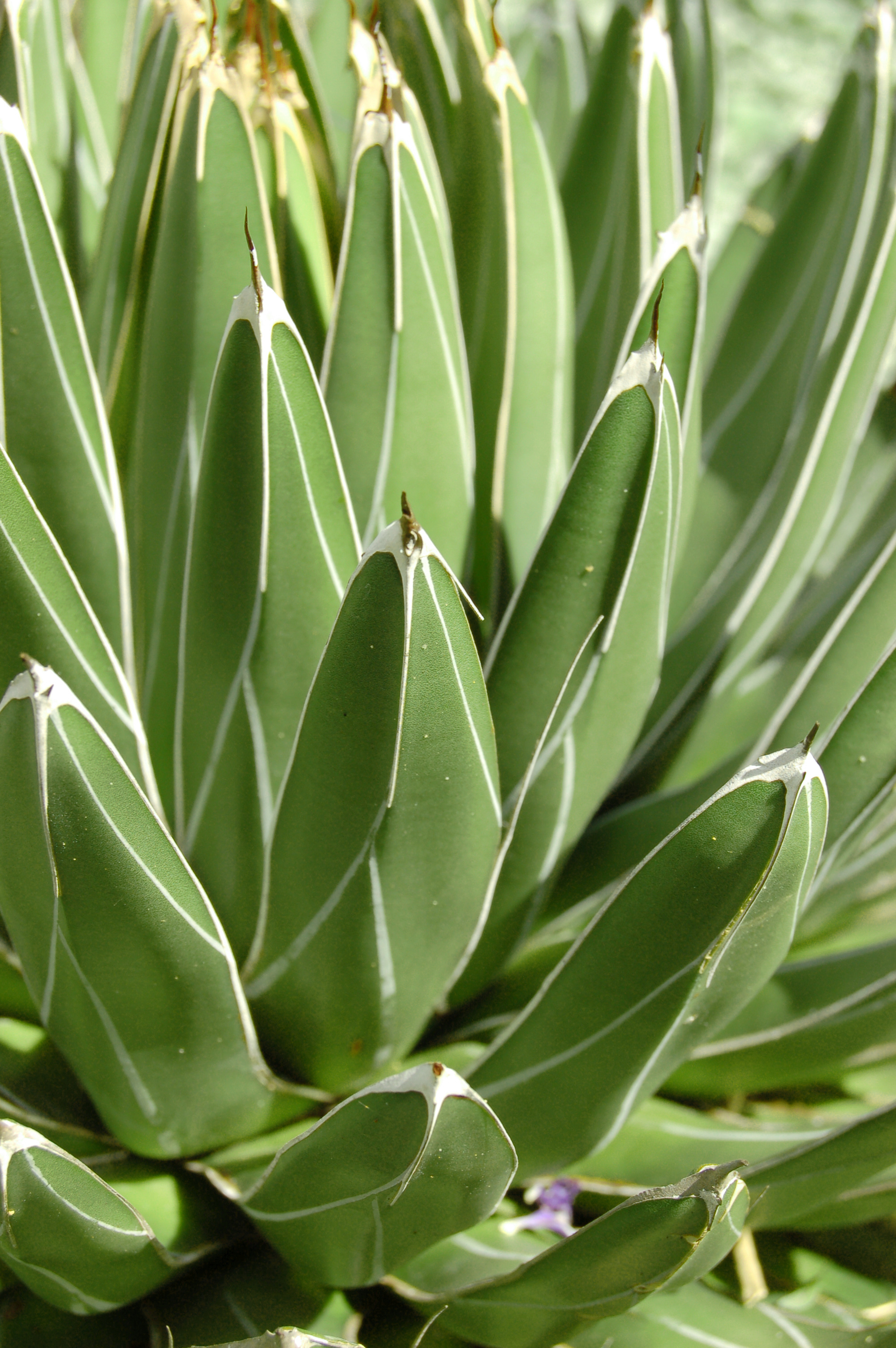
Leaf closeup

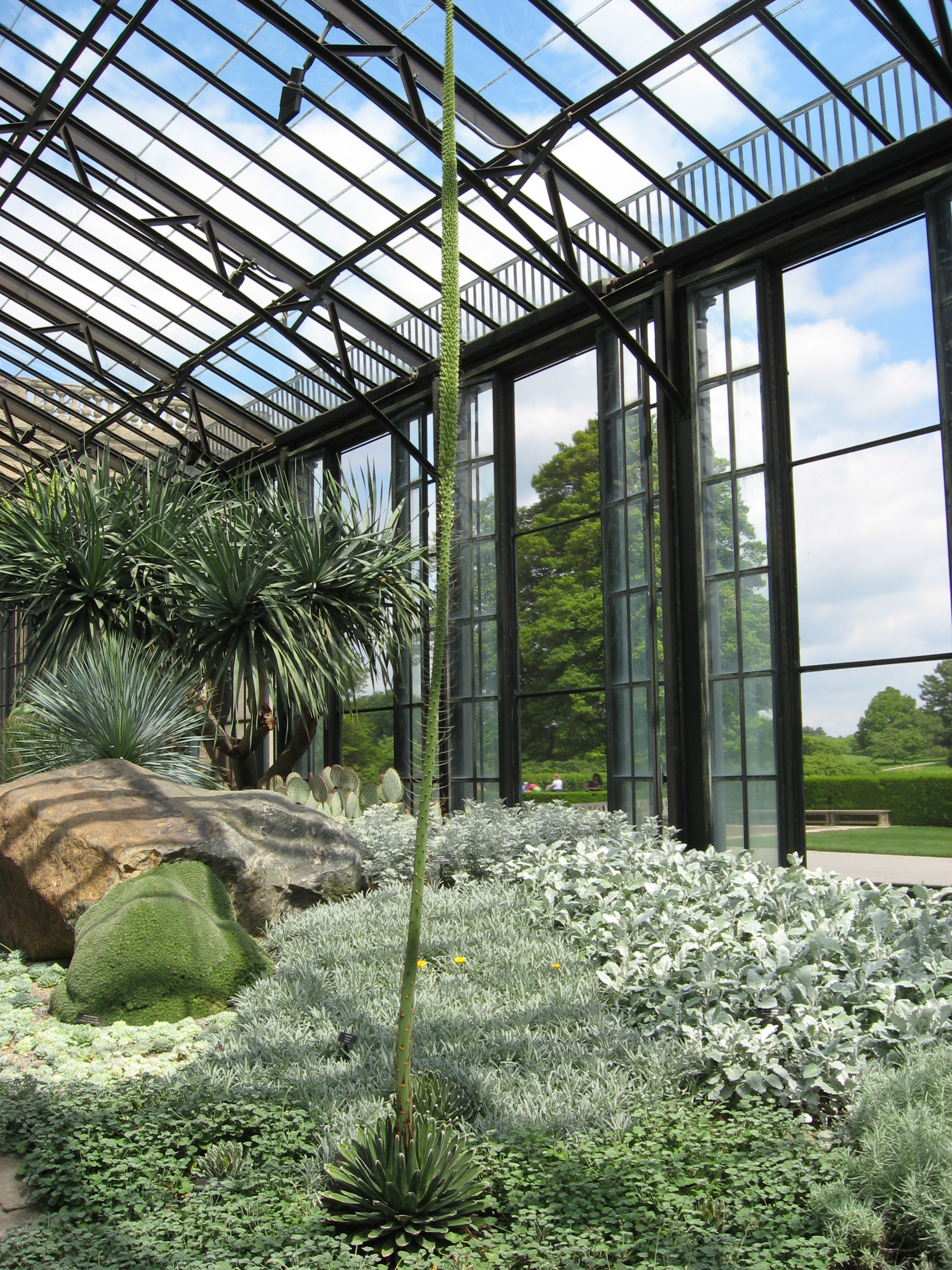
In bloom

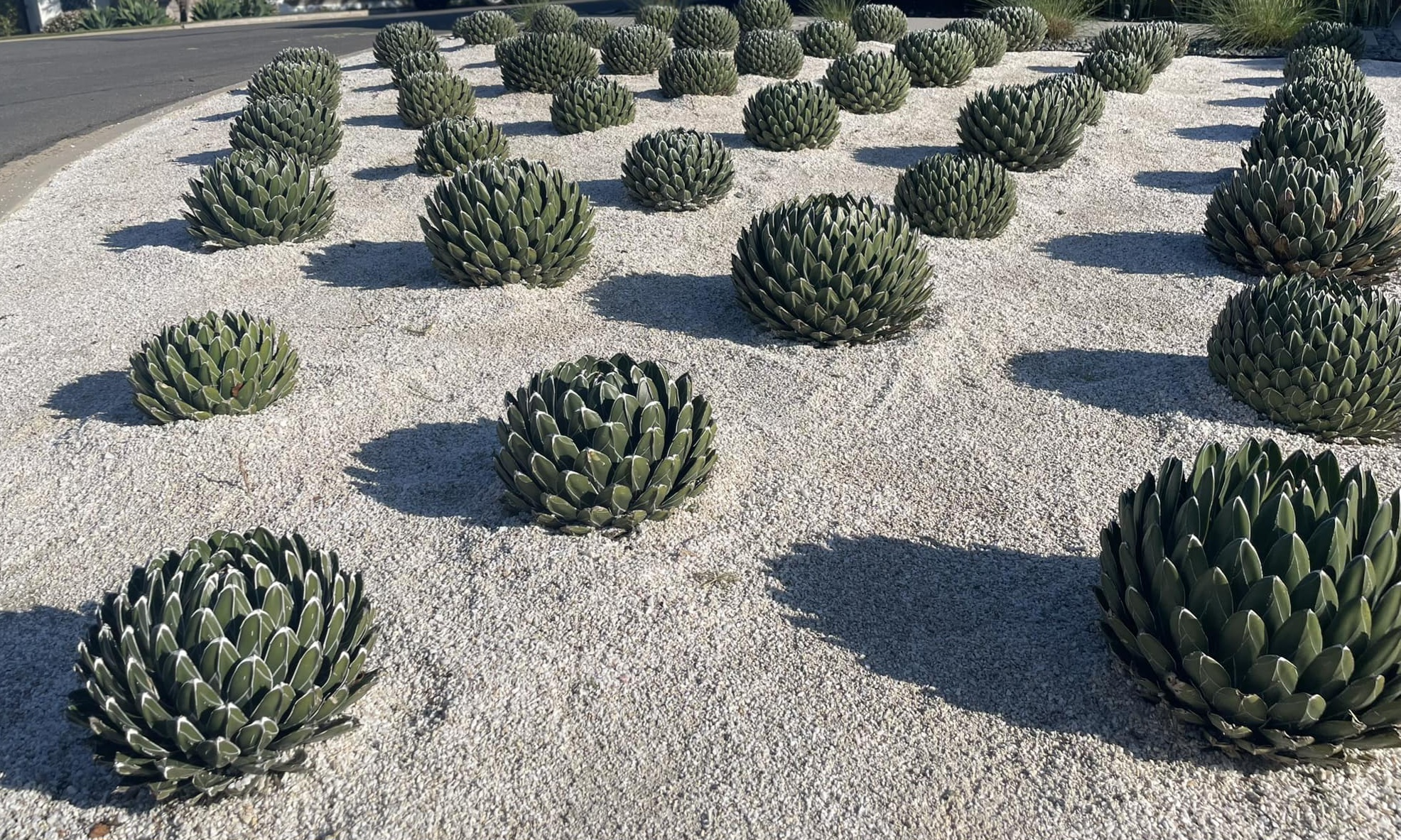
In a horticultural garden
