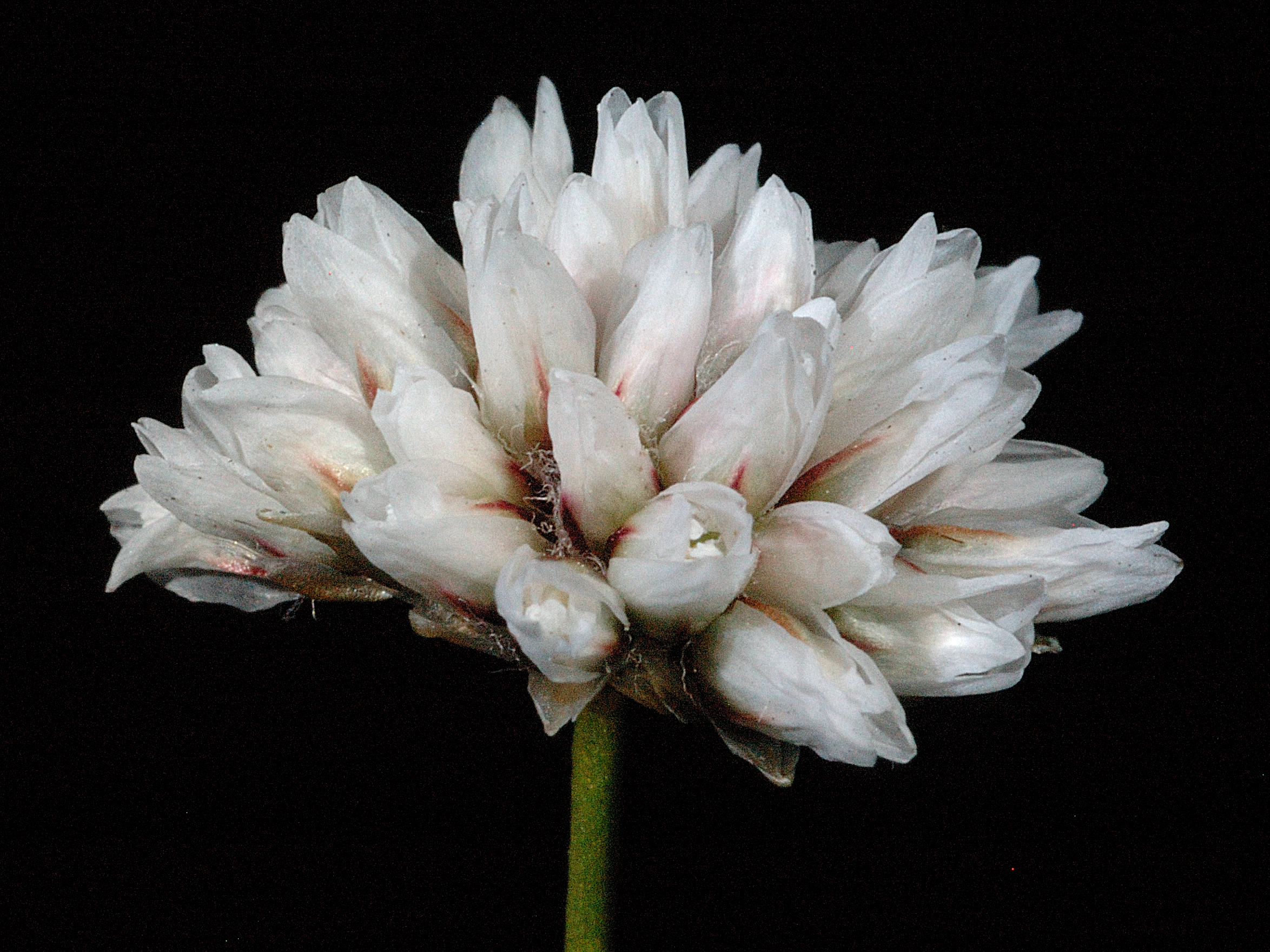

Scientific classification
- Kingdom: Plantae
- Clade: Tracheophytes
- Clade: Angiosperms
- Clade: Monocots
- Order: Asparagales
- Family: Asparagaceae
- Subfamily: Lomandroideae
- Genus: Laxmannia
- Species: L. squarrosa

Binomial name
- Laxmannia squarrosa Lindl.

Synonyms
- Bartlingia sessilis (Lindl.) F.Muell. Bartlingia squarrosa (Lindl.) F.Muell. Laxmannia acuta Endl. Laxmannia pauciflora Endl. Laxmannia sessilis Lindl. Laxmannia sylvestris Endl.

= Laxmannia squarrosa =

Species of flowering plant

Laxmannia squarrosa is a species of Laxmannia, a genus of tufted perennial herbs in the family Asparagaceae, subfamily Lomandroideae, which is endemic to Western Australia. From 0.03 to 0.1 m high, it grows on gravel and lateritic sand, and its white flowers may be seen from September to November.
