= Laxmannia minor =

Scientific classification
- Kingdom: Plantae
- Clade: Tracheophytes
- Clade: Angiosperms
- Clade: Monocots
- Order: Asparagales
- Family: Asparagaceae
- Subfamily: Lomandroideae
- Genus: Laxmannia
- Species: L. minor

Binomial name
- Laxmannia minor R.Br.

Species of plant

Laxmannia minor, also known as paperlily, is flowering herbaceous plant that occurs in Southwest Australia. It is a slender, perennial stoloniferous plant, propped on its roots to avoid desiccation when the soil surface temperature is high. The height is between 90–250 mm (3.5–9.8 in). White flowers are presented on a scape from September to December. The flowerhead is a small cluster of 18–28 flowers. The petal-like flower parts are 4–6 mm (0.16–0.24 in) long.

The preference is for black or grey peaty soil on winter wet plains or the regional granite outcrops.

The description of the species was published by Robert Brown in 1810.
