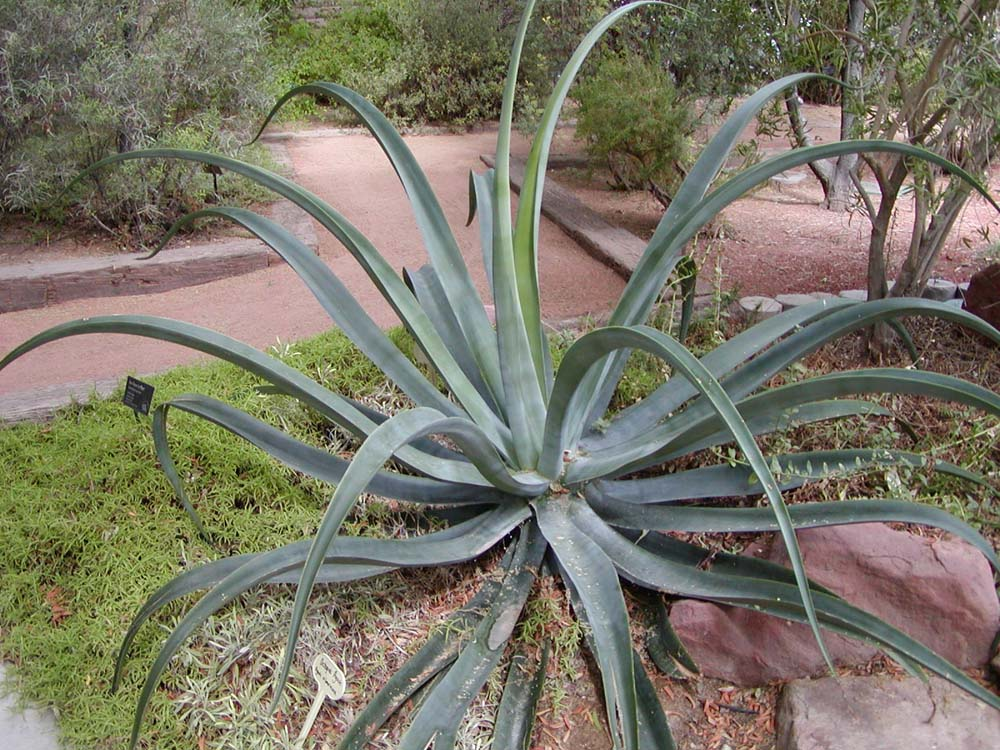
- Grown as an ornamental plant.

Conservation status
- Least Concern (IUCN 3.1)

Scientific classification
- Kingdom: Plantae
- Clade: Embryophytes
- Clade: Tracheophytes
- Clade: Spermatophytes
- Clade: Angiosperms
- Clade: Monocots
- Order: Asparagales
- Family: Asparagaceae
- Subfamily: Agavoideae
- Genus: Agave
- Species: A. vilmoriniana

Binomial name
- Agave vilmoriniana Berger

Synonyms
- Agave eduardi Trel.; Agave houghii Trel.; Agave mayoensis Gentry

= Agave vilmoriniana =

Agave vilmoriniana (Octopus agave)

Species of flowering plant

Agave vilmoriniana, sometimes misspelled vilmoriana, and popularly known as octopus agave, is a species of agave endemic to Mexico. It is known for its untoothed arching and twisting leaves.

== Taxonomy ==
Wild plants had been found in 1899 by Joseph Nelson Rose near Guadalajara, Jalisco. The species was named by Alwin Berger in 1913 in honor of Maurice de Vilmorin, based on specimens collected by Leon Diguet and grown at the Jardin des Plantes in Paris.

== Distribution ==
In nature, the octopus agave prefers the cliffs of barrancas of southern Sonora, Chihuahua, Sinaloa, Jalisco, Durango, Nayarit and Aguascalientes, typically between elevations of 600 to 1,700 meters (2,000 to 5,600 ft).

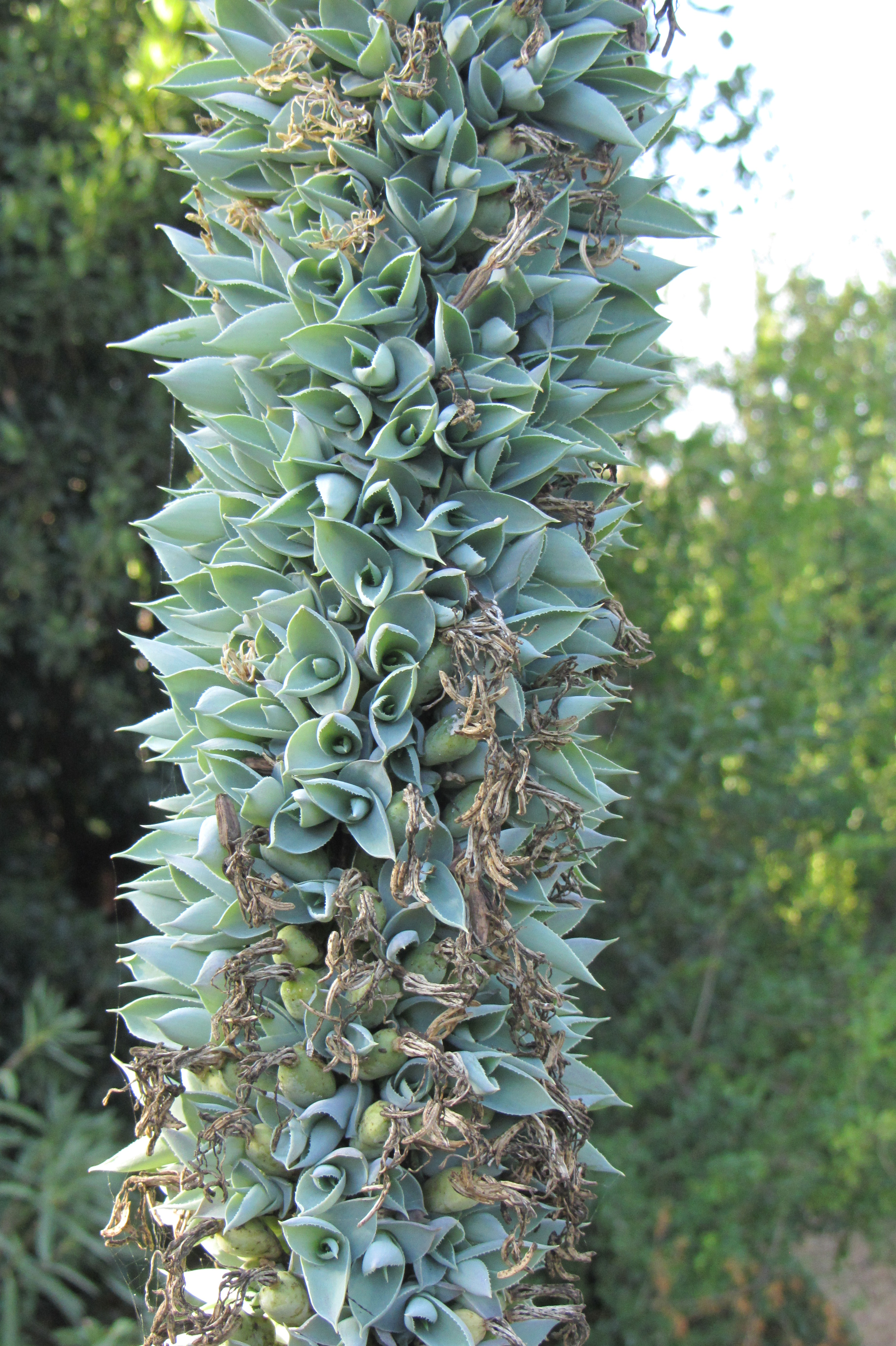
Agave vilmoriniana - Bulbils on the flowering stem

== Uses ==
Agave vilmoriniana has one of the highest concentrations of the sapogenin smilagenin; in parts of México, the leaves are cut and dried, and the fibers are beaten to make them into a brush with built-in soap.

The "octopus agave" is cultivated as an ornamental plant for planting in arid gardens and containers.

== See also ==
- Endemic flora of Mexico
