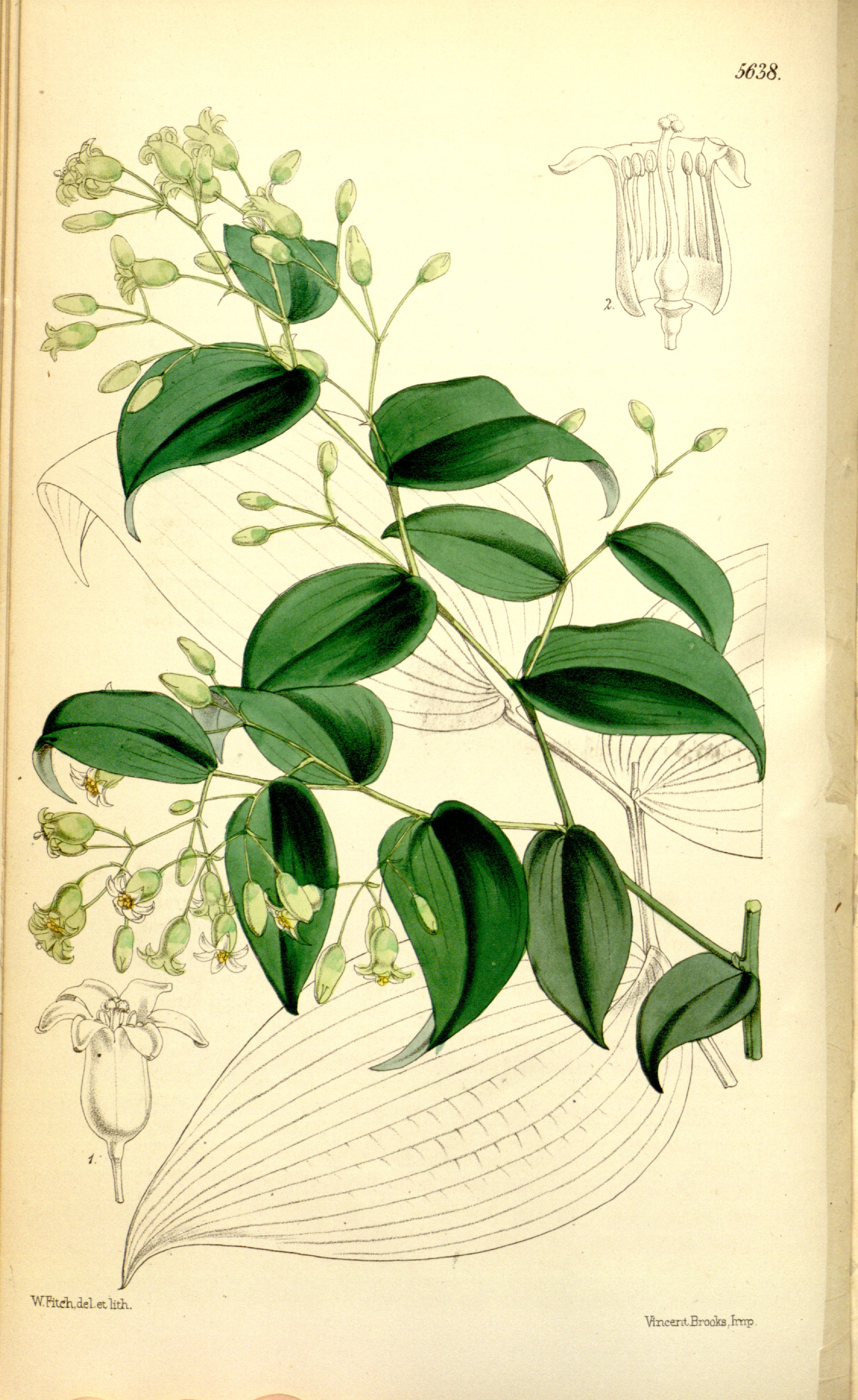
- 1867 illustration

Scientific classification
- Kingdom: Plantae
- Clade: Embryophytes
- Clade: Tracheophytes
- Clade: Spermatophytes
- Clade: Angiosperms
- Clade: Monocots
- Order: Asparagales
- Family: Asparagaceae
- Subfamily: Agavoideae
- Genus: Behnia; Didr.
- Species: B. reticulata

Binomial name
- Behnia reticulata (Thunb.) Didr.

Synonyms
- Dictyopsis Harv. ex Hook.f. [nomen superfluum]; Hylonome Webb & Berthel.; Dictyopsis thunbergii Harv.; Hylonome reticulata (Thunb.) Webb & Berthel.; Ruscus reticulatus Thunb.

= Behnia =

Genus of flowering plants

Behnia is a genus of flowering plants. In the APG III classification system, it is placed in the family Asparagaceae, subfamily Agavoideae (formerly the family Agavaceae). There is only one known species, Behnia reticulata, a climber plant native to southern Africa (Malawi, Mozambique, Zimbabwe, South Africa and Eswatini).
