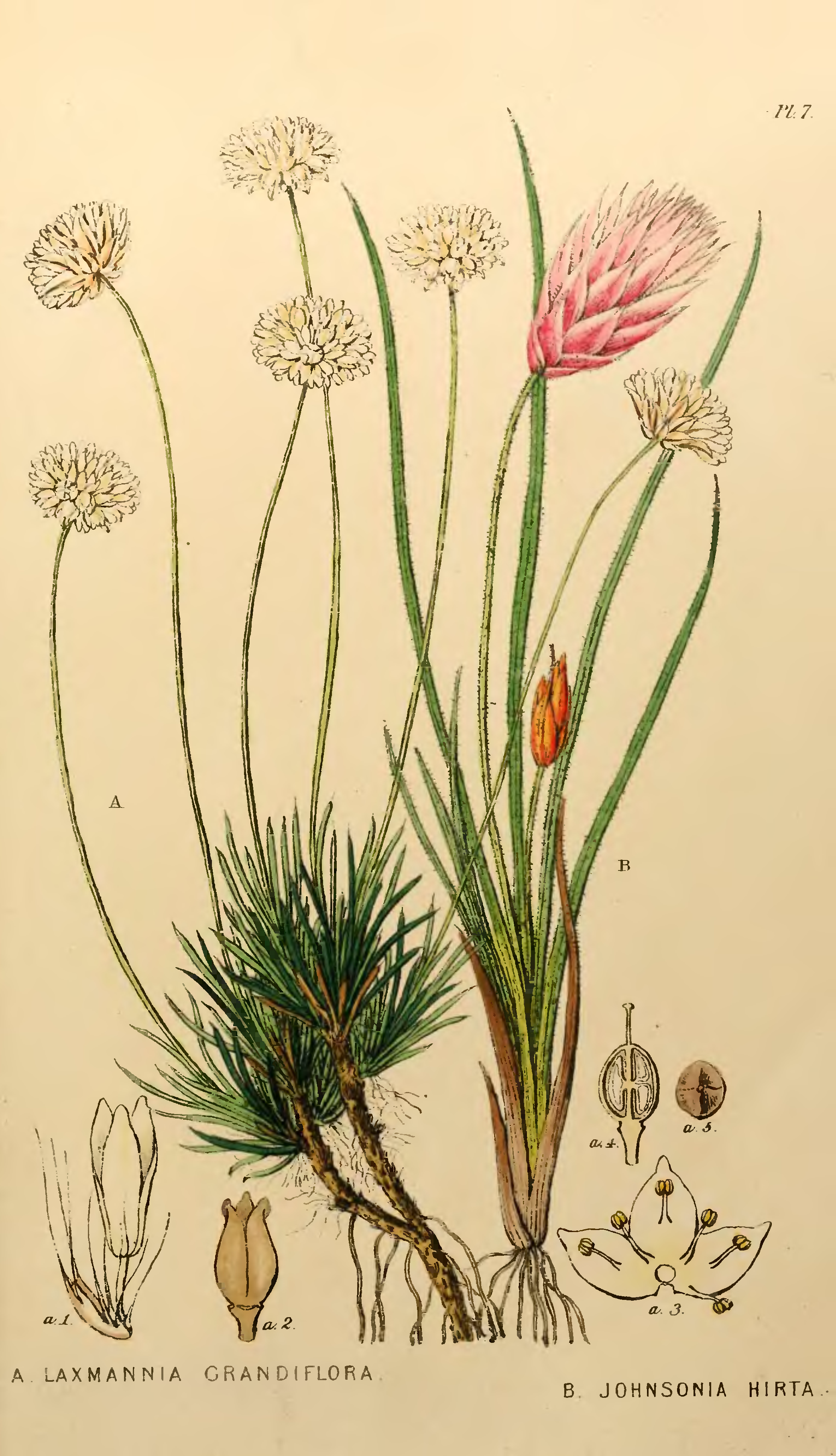
- Laxmannia grandiflora 1839 illustration

Scientific classification
- Kingdom: Plantae
- Clade: Tracheophytes
- Clade: Angiosperms
- Clade: Monocots
- Order: Asparagales
- Family: Asparagaceae
- Subfamily: Lomandroideae
- Genus: Laxmannia; R.Br.

Synonyms
- Bartlingia F.Muell. ex Benth., nom. illeg.

= Laxmannia =

Genus of flowering plants

Laxmannia is a genus of tufted perennial herbs in the family Asparagaceae, subfamily Lomandroideae, that are endemic to Australia.

Species:

- Laxmannia arida Keighery - WA, NT
- Laxmannia brachyphylla F.Muell. – Stilted Paper-Lily - WA
- Laxmannia compacta Conran & P.I.Forst. - NSW, Qld
- Laxmannia gracilis R.Br. – Slender Wire-lily - NSW, Qld, Vic
- Laxmannia grandiflora Lindl. - WA
- Laxmannia jamesii Keighery – Paperlily - WA
- Laxmannia minor R.Br. - WA
- Laxmannia omnifertilis Keighery - WA
- Laxmannia orientalis Keighery – Dwarf Wire-lily - SA, Vic, Tas
- Laxmannia paleacea F.Muell. - WA
- Laxmannia ramosa Lindl. – Branching Lily - WA
- Laxmannia sessiliflora Decne. - WA
- Laxmannia squarrosa Lindl. – Nodding Lily - WA
