= Diora cajamarcaensis =

Scientific classification
- Kingdom: Plantae
- Clade: Tracheophytes
- Clade: Angiosperms
- Clade: Monocots
- Order: Asparagales
- Family: Asparagaceae
- Subfamily: Agavoideae
- Genus: Diora; Ravenna
- Species: D. cajamarcaensis

Binomial name
- Diora cajamarcaensis (Poelln.) Ravenna

Synonyms
- Anthericum cajamarcaense Poelln.

Species of plant

Diora is a genus of plants in the Agavoideae. It contains only one known species, Diora cajamarcaensis, endemic to Peru.
