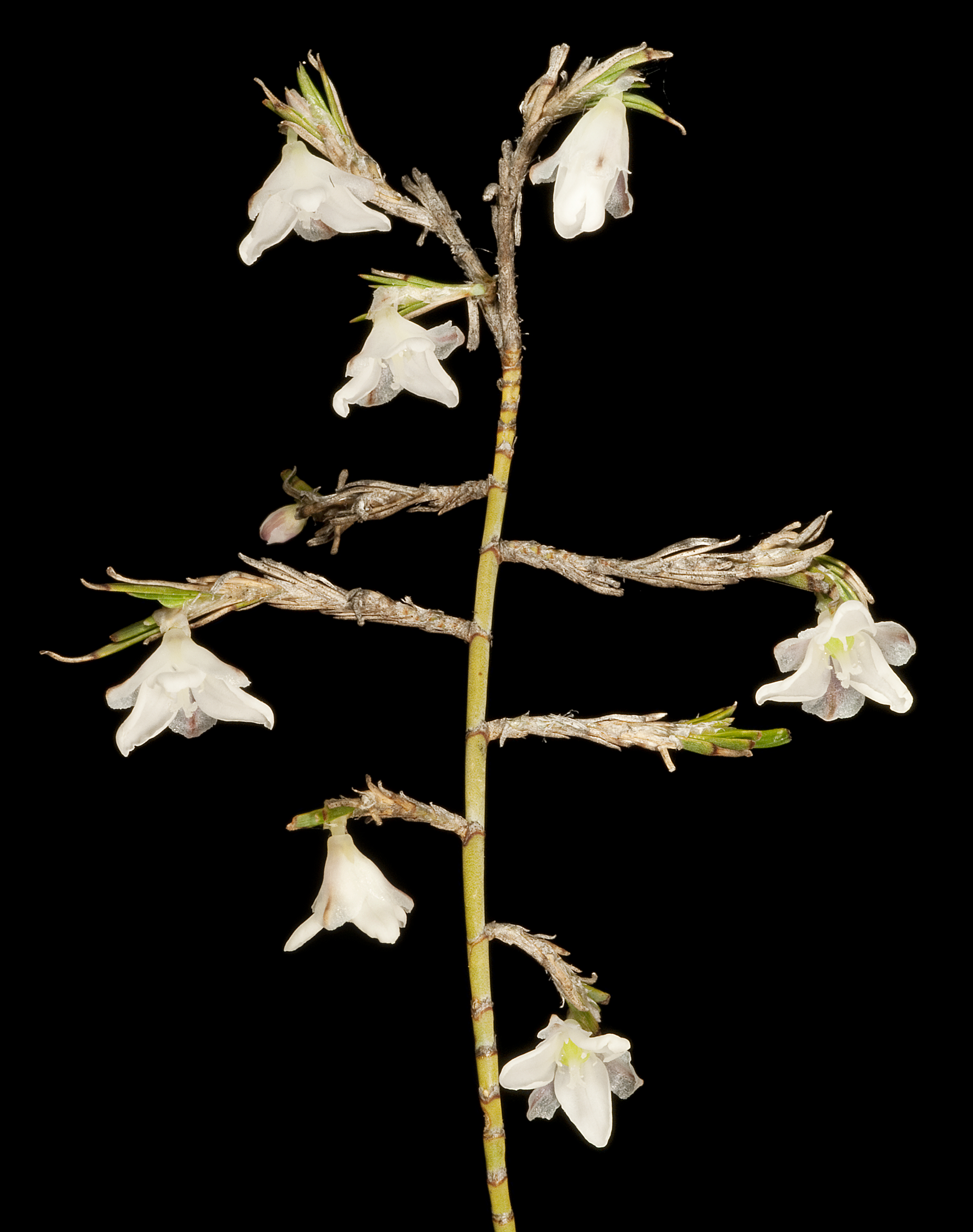
- Xerolirion divaricata
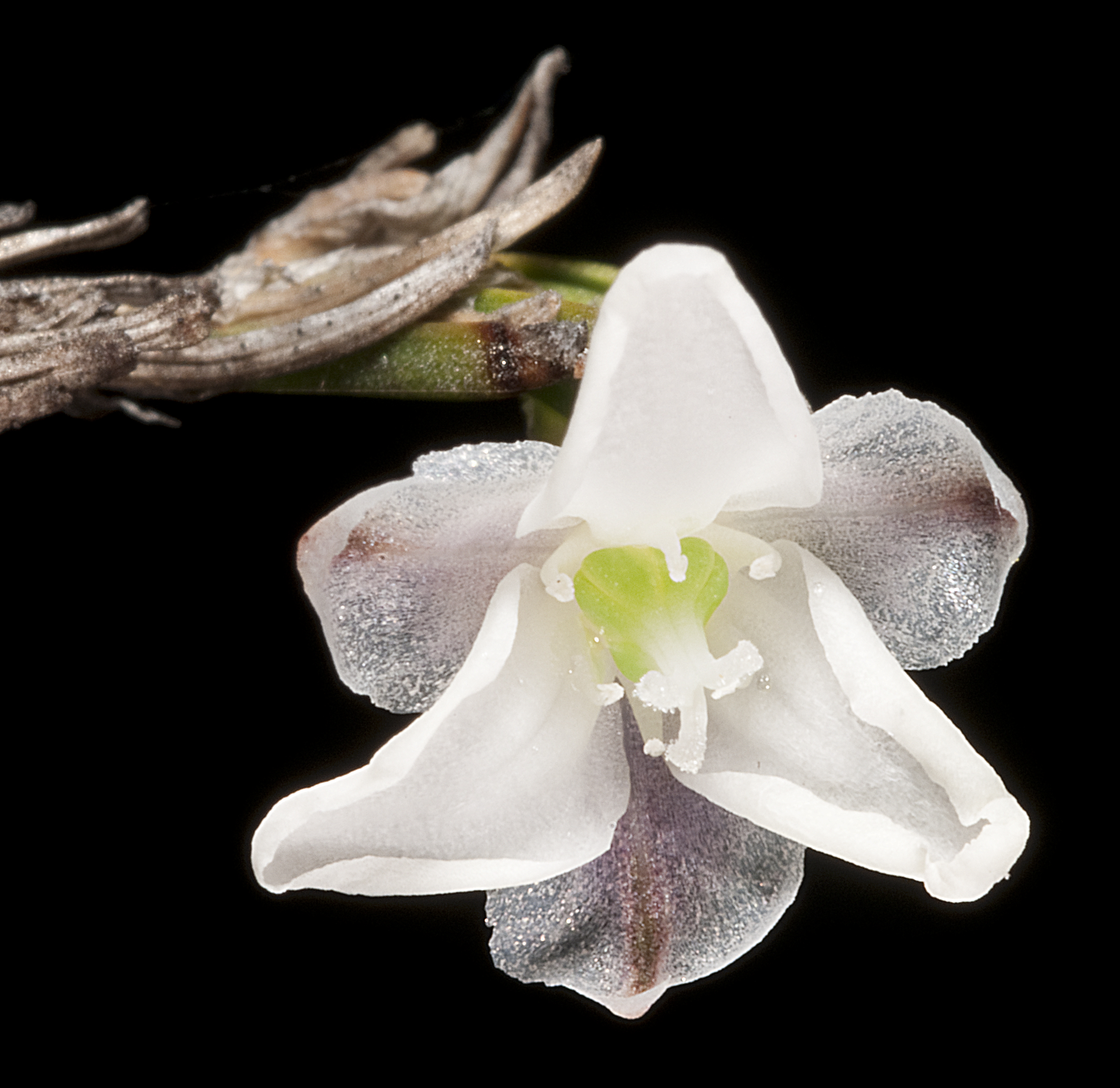

Scientific classification
- Kingdom: Plantae
- Clade: Tracheophytes
- Clade: Angiosperms
- Clade: Monocots
- Order: Asparagales
- Family: Asparagaceae
- Subfamily: Lomandroideae
- Genus: Xerolirion; A.S.George
- Species: X. divaricata

Binomial name
- Xerolirion divaricata A.S.George

= Xerolirion =

Basil's asparagus

Genus of flowering plants

Xerolirion is a monotypic genus of perennial herbs in the family Asparagaceae, subfamily Lomandroideae. The only known species is Xerolirion divaricata, commonly known as Basil's asparagus, from Western Australia .

Both genus and species were first described by Alex George in 1986.
