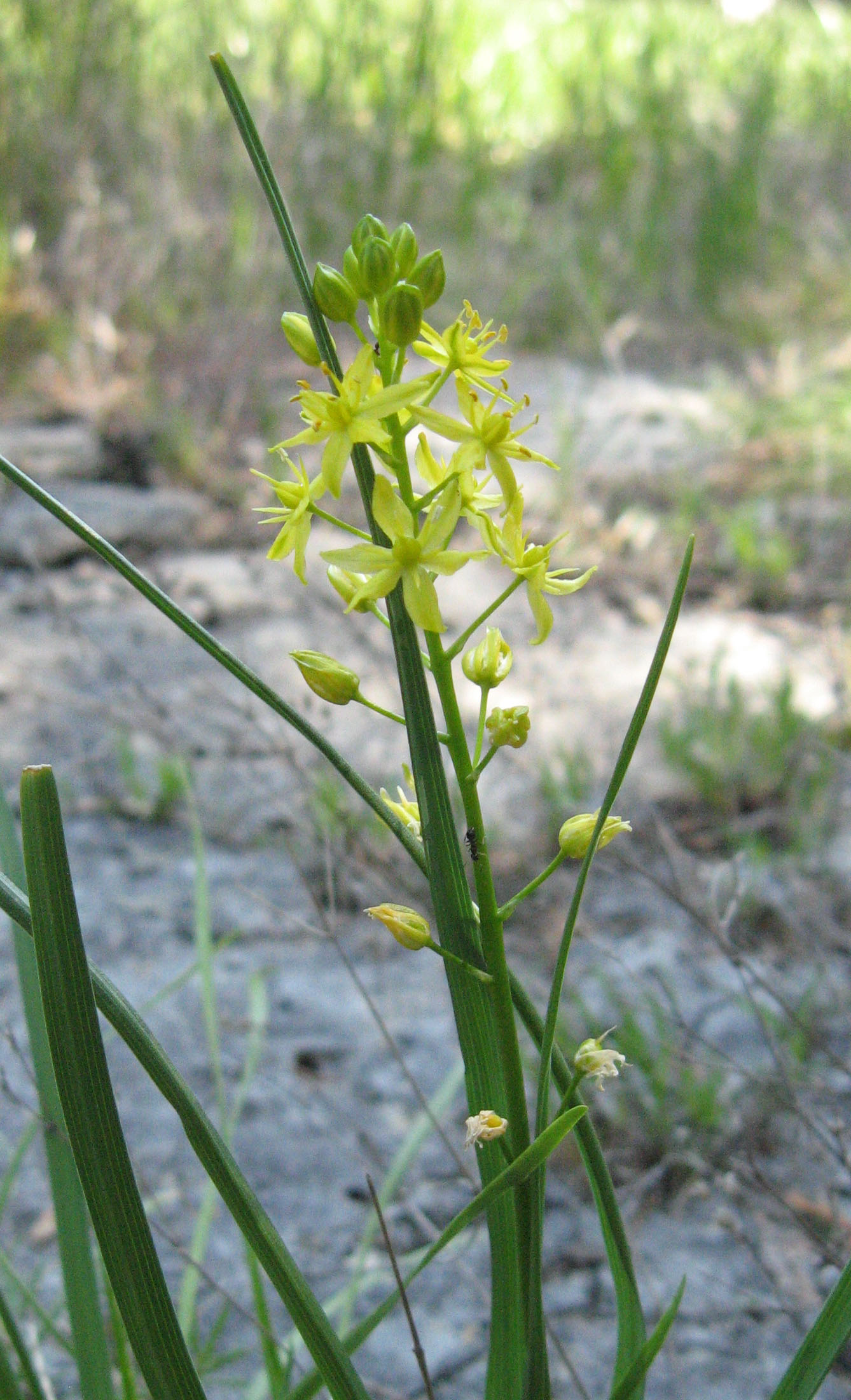
- Schoenolirion croceum

Scientific classification
- Kingdom: Plantae
- Clade: Tracheophytes
- Clade: Angiosperms
- Clade: Monocots
- Order: Asparagales
- Family: Asparagaceae
- Subfamily: Agavoideae
- Genus: Schoenolirion; Durand

Synonyms
- Amblostima Raf.; Oxytria Raf.

= Schoenolirion =

Rush-lily

Genus of flowering plants

Schoenolirion, rush-lily or sunnybell, is a genus of three recognized species of flowering plants, all endemic to the southeastern United States. In the APG III classification system, the genus is placed in the family Asparagaceae, subfamily Agavoideae (formerly the family Agavaceae).

== Species ==
Image	Scientific name	Distribution
	Schoenolirion albiflorum (Raf.) R.R.Gates	Florida, Georgia, Alabama
	Schoenolirion croceum (Michx.) Alph.Wood	from North Carolina to eastern Texas
	Schoenolirion wrightii Sherman	Texas, Louisiana, Arkansas, Alabama
