= Occultia =

Scientific classification
- Kingdom: Plantae
- Clade: Tracheophytes
- Clade: Angiosperms
- Clade: Monocots
- Order: Asparagales
- Family: Asparagaceae
- Subfamily: Scilloideae
- Genus: Occultia; Stedje & Rulkens

Species
- Occultia fragrans Rulkens & Stedje; Occultia ledebourioides (Baker) Stedje & Rulkens

Genus of flowering plants

Occultia is a genus of flowering plants in the family Asparagaceae. It includes two species native to Malawi and Mozambique.

- Occultia fragrans Rulkens & Stedje
- Occultia ledebourioides (Baker) Stedje & Rulkens
