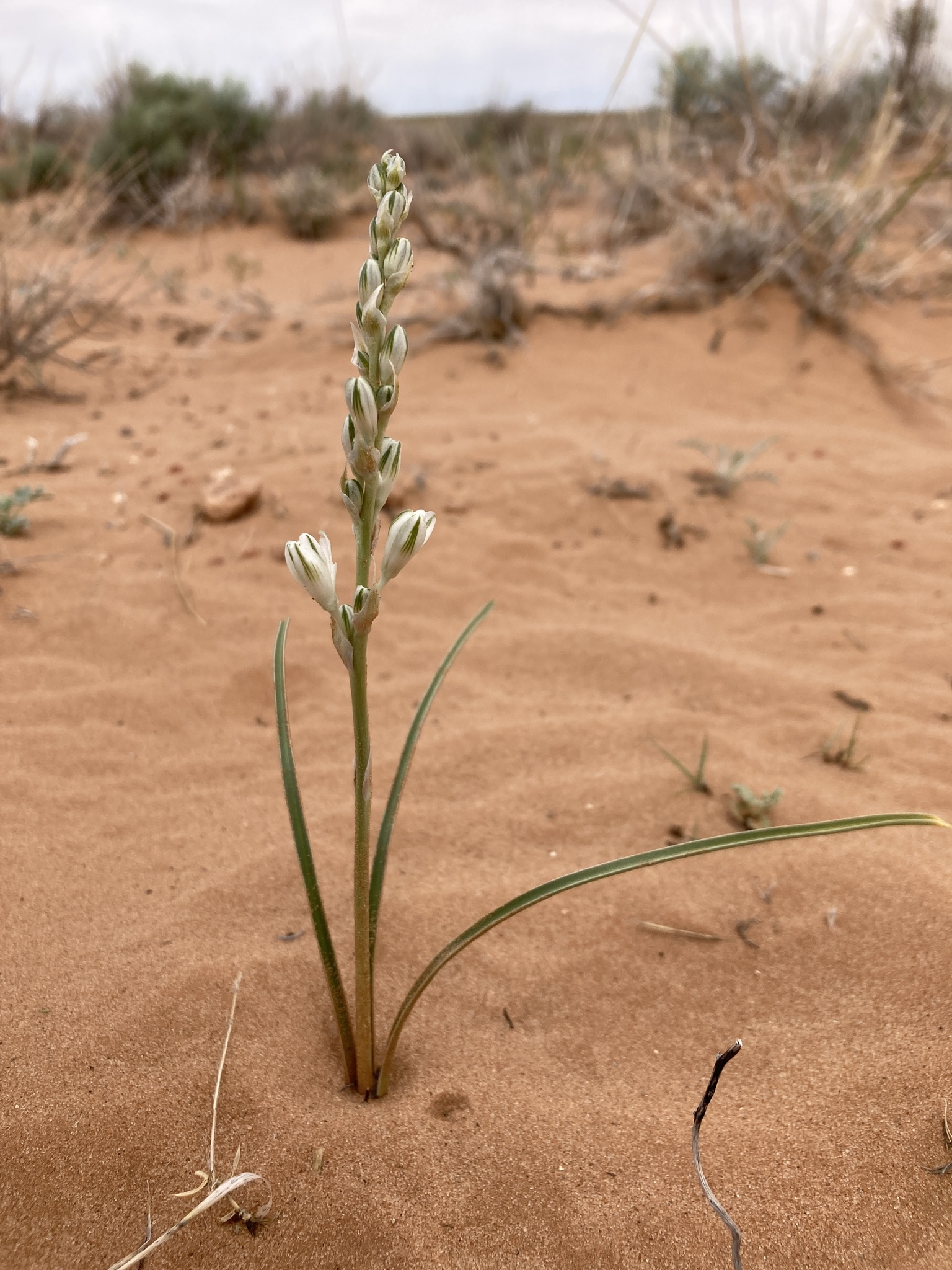

Conservation status
- Vulnerable (NatureServe)

Scientific classification
- Kingdom: Plantae
- Clade: Tracheophytes
- Clade: Angiosperms
- Clade: Monocots
- Order: Asparagales
- Family: Asparagaceae
- Subfamily: Agavoideae
- Genus: Eremocrinum; M.E.Jones
- Species: E. albomarginatum

Binomial name
- Eremocrinum albomarginatum (M.E.Jones) M.E.Jones

Synonyms
- Hesperanthes albomarginata M.E.Jones

= Eremocrinum =

Genus of flowering plants

Eremocrinum is a monotypic genus of plants in the subfamily Agavoideae containing the single species Eremocrinum albomarginatum. It is known by the common names Utah solitaire lily, Intermountain false-wheatgrass, desert lily, lonely lily, and sand lily. It is native to the western United States, where it is known from Arizona and Utah.

This plant grows from a short rhizome with yellowish, tuberous roots. The narrow leaves are up to 40 centimeters long and may grow erect or spread out along the ground. The scape grows upright, reaching maximum heights of 35 to 40 centimeters. The inflorescence is up to 30 centimeters tall and bears many flowers along its length. The flowers have six whitish or greenish tepals each with three dark midveins along the lower surface.

This plant is endemic to the Colorado Plateau, where it grows in sandy desert habitat types, such as desert shrubland and sand dunes. Associated plants include ephedra (Ephedra spp.), rosemary mints (Poliomintha spp.) and yuccas (Yucca spp.).
