= Echinoagave =

Scientific classification
- Kingdom: Plantae
- Clade: Tracheophytes
- Clade: Angiosperms
- Clade: Monocots
- Order: Asparagales
- Family: Asparagaceae
- Subfamily: Agavoideae
- Genus: Echinoagave; A.Vázquez, Rosales & García-Mor.

Genus of flowering plants

Echinoagave is a genus of flowering plants in the family Asparagaceae. It includes 12 species native to Mexico.

The species in genus Echinoagave were formerly placed in genus Agave, and both genera share a rosette habit and terminal spine. Echinoagave species are distinguished by their generally compact hedgehog-like shape, with cylindrical to subcylindrical to flattened leaves with hard, firm, striate-sulcate and serrulate margins. Echinoagave plants are typically polycarpic, flowering multiple times before dying, in contrast to the typically monocarpic Agave species whose rosettes die after flowering.

== Species ==
12 species are accepted.

- Echinoagave albopilosa (I.Cabral, Villarreal & A.E.Estrada) A.Vázquez, Rosales & García-Mor.
- Echinoagave cremnophila (G.D.Starr, Etter & Kristen) A.Vázquez, Rosales & García-Mor.
- Echinoagave cryptica (G.D.Starr & T.J.Davis) A.Vázquez, Rosales & García-Mor.
- Echinoagave gracielae (Galvan & Zamudio) A.Vázquez, Rosales & García-Mor.
- Echinoagave kavandivi (García-Mend. & C.Chávez) A.Vázquez, Rosales & García-Mor.
- Echinoagave lexii (García-Mor., J.García-Jim. & Iamonico) A.Vázquez, Rosales & García-Mor.
- Echinoagave nievesiorum A.Vázquez, A.T.Nuño, Cházaro, Padilla-Lepe & García-Mor.
- Echinoagave petrophila (García-Mend. & E.Martínez) A.Vázquez, Rosales & García-Mor.
- Echinoagave rzedowskiana (P.Carrillo, Vega & R.Delgad.) A.Vázquez, Rosales & García-Mor.
- Echinoagave striata (Zucc.) A.Vázquez, Rosales & García-Mor.
- Echinoagave stricta (Salm-Dyck) A.Vázquez, Rosales & García-Mor.
- Echinoagave tenuifolia (Zamudio & E.Sánchez) A.Vázquez, Rosales & García-Mor.
