= Diuranthera =

Scientific classification
- Kingdom: Plantae
- Clade: Embryophytes
- Clade: Tracheophytes
- Clade: Spermatophytes
- Clade: Angiosperms
- Clade: Monocots
- Order: Asparagales
- Family: Asparagaceae
- Subfamily: Agavoideae
- Genus: Diuranthera; Hemsl.

Species
- See text

Genus of flowering plants

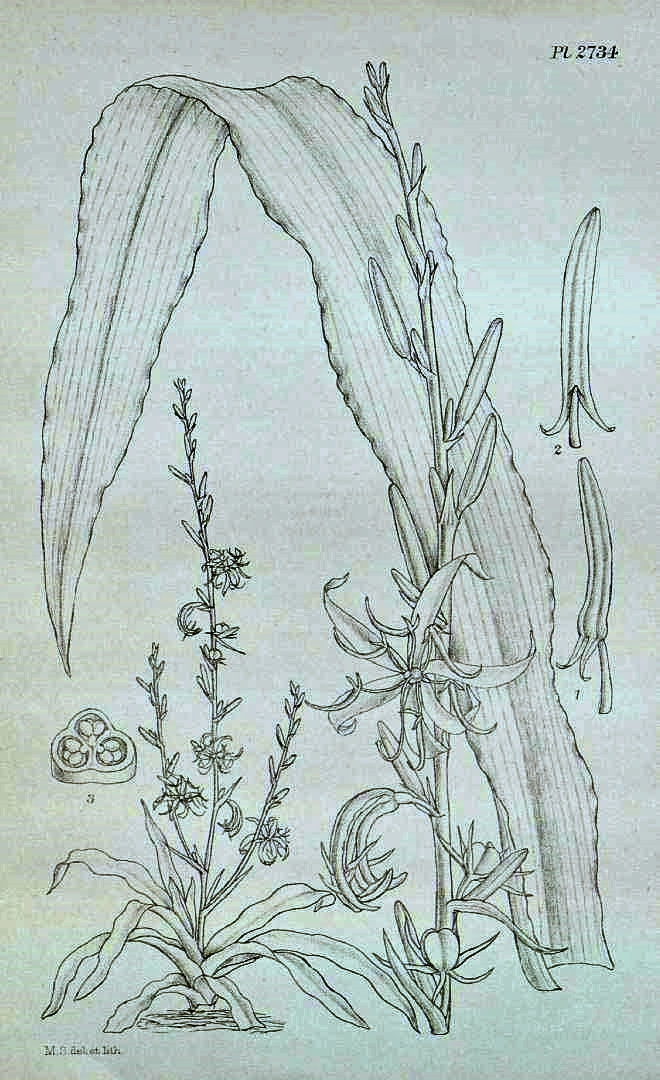
Diuranthera major

Diuranthera is a small genus of flowering plants in the family Asparagaceae, endemic to central China. The Bouyei people of China use a decoction of Diuranthera major to treat gynecological conditions.

== Species ==
Currently accepted species include:

- Diuranthera chinglingensis J.Q.Xing & T.C.Cui
- Diuranthera inarticulata F.T.Wang & K.Y.Lang
- Diuranthera major Hemsl.
- Diuranthera minor (C.H.Wright) Hemsl.
