= Diamena =

Scientific classification
- Kingdom: Plantae
- Clade: Tracheophytes
- Clade: Angiosperms
- Clade: Monocots
- Order: Asparagales
- Family: Asparagaceae
- Subfamily: Agavoideae
- Tribe: Anthericeae
- Genus: Diamena; Ravenna
- Species: D. stenantha

Binomial name
- Diamena stenantha (Ravenna) Ravenna

Synonyms
- Anthericum stenanthum Ravenna; Paradisea stenantha (Ravenna) Ravenna in G.T.Prance & T.S.Elias

Species of plant

Diamena is a genus of plants in the Agavoideae. It contains only one known species, Diamena stenantha, endemic to the La Libertad region of Peru.
