= Pseudolachenalia =

Scientific classification
- Kingdom: Plantae
- Clade: Tracheophytes
- Clade: Angiosperms
- Clade: Monocots
- Order: Asparagales
- Family: Asparagaceae
- Subfamily: Scilloideae
- Tribe: Hyacintheae
- Genus: Pseudolachenalia; G.D.Duncan
- Species: P. isopetala

Binomial name
- Pseudolachenalia isopetala (Jacq.) G.D.Duncan

Synonyms
- Lachenalia isopetala Jacq. (1797) (basionym); Scillopsis isopetala (Jacq.) Lem.

Genus of flowering plants

Pseudolachenalia is a genus of flowering plants in the family Asparagaceae. It includes a single species, Pseudolachenalia isopetala, a bulbous geophyte native to the western central Cape Provinces of South Africa.

The species was first described as Lachenalia isopetala by Nikolaus Joseph von Jacquin in 1797. In 2022 Graham D. Duncan et al. placed the species in a new monotypic genus Pseudolachenalia based on a phylogenetic analysis of Lachenalia species.
