= Clara (plant) =

Scientific classification
- Kingdom: Plantae
- Clade: Tracheophytes
- Clade: Angiosperms
- Clade: Monocots
- Order: Asparagales
- Family: Asparagaceae
- Subfamily: Agavoideae
- Genus: Clara; Kunth

Genus of flowering plants

Clara is a genus of flowering plants in the family Asparagaceae. It includes three species native to South America, ranging from southern Brazil and Paraguay to Uruguay and northeastern Argentina.

- Clara gracilis R.C.Lopes & Andreata
- Clara ophiopogonoides Kunth
- Clara stricta (L.B.Sm.) R.C.Lopes & Andreata
