= Paraagave =

Scientific classification
- Kingdom: Plantae
- Clade: Tracheophytes
- Clade: Angiosperms
- Clade: Monocots
- Order: Asparagales
- Family: Asparagaceae
- Subfamily: Agavoideae
- Genus: Paraagave; A.Vázquez, Rosales & García-Mor.
- Species: P. ellemeetiana

Binomial name
- Paraagave ellemeetiana (K.Koch) A.Vázquez, Rosales & García-Mor.

Synonyms
- Agave ellemeetiana K.Koch

Genus of flowering plants

Paraagave is a genus of flowering plants in the family Asparagaceae. It includes a single species, Paraagave ellemeetiana, a succulent perennial native to central Veracruz and northern Oaxaca in Mexico.
