= Trihesperus =

Scientific classification
- Kingdom: Plantae
- Clade: Embryophytes
- Clade: Tracheophytes
- Clade: Spermatophytes
- Clade: Angiosperms
- Clade: Monocots
- Order: Asparagales
- Family: Asparagaceae
- Subfamily: Agavoideae
- Genus: Trihesperus; Herb.

Species
- See text

Genus of flowering plants

Trihesperus is a small genus of flowering plants in the family Asparagaceae, generally found in the Andes of Colombia, Ecuador, Peru, Bolivia, and northwest Argentina. Veitch Nurseries developed a cultivar of Trihesperus latifolius with striped foliage which they called Anthericum latifolium albo media pictum.

== Species ==
Currently accepted species include:

- Trihesperus glaucus (Ruiz & Pav.) Herb.
- Trihesperus latifolius (Kunth) Herb.
