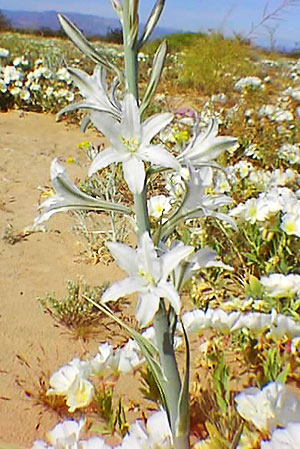

Conservation status
- Vulnerable (NatureServe)

Scientific classification
- Kingdom: Plantae
- Clade: Tracheophytes
- Clade: Angiosperms
- Clade: Monocots
- Order: Asparagales
- Family: Asparagaceae
- Subfamily: Agavoideae
- Genus: Hesperocallis
- Species: H. undulata

Binomial name
- Hesperocallis undulata A.Gray, 1868

= Hesperocallis =

Genus of flowering plants

Hesperocallis is a genus of flowering plants that includes a single species, Hesperocallis undulata, known as the desert lily or ajo lily.

== Description ==
Plants grow from an ovoid bulb with 2-3 leaves. Plants have ruffled edge leaves that are linear lanceolate 20-40 x 1-1.5 cm. Bracts are ovate 1-1.5 cm long. Pedicils are 1 cm long. Flowers form on a 10-30 long inflorescence with many flowers. Flowers are white funnel shaped, with a blue green or silver gray band in the middle of the back of the petals. The seed capsules is 1.5 cm long and rigid. Seeds are 0.5 cm long.

== Distribution ==
It is found growing in sand flats and dunes in the desert areas of southwestern North America, in Baja California and Sonora, Northwestern Mexico; California, Nevada, and Arizona. The plant grows in Mojave Desert, Colorado Desert, and Sonoran Desert habitats. The bulbs grow up to 60 cm below the surface of the soil. This species is pollinated by sphinx moth. Plants bloom from February to May.

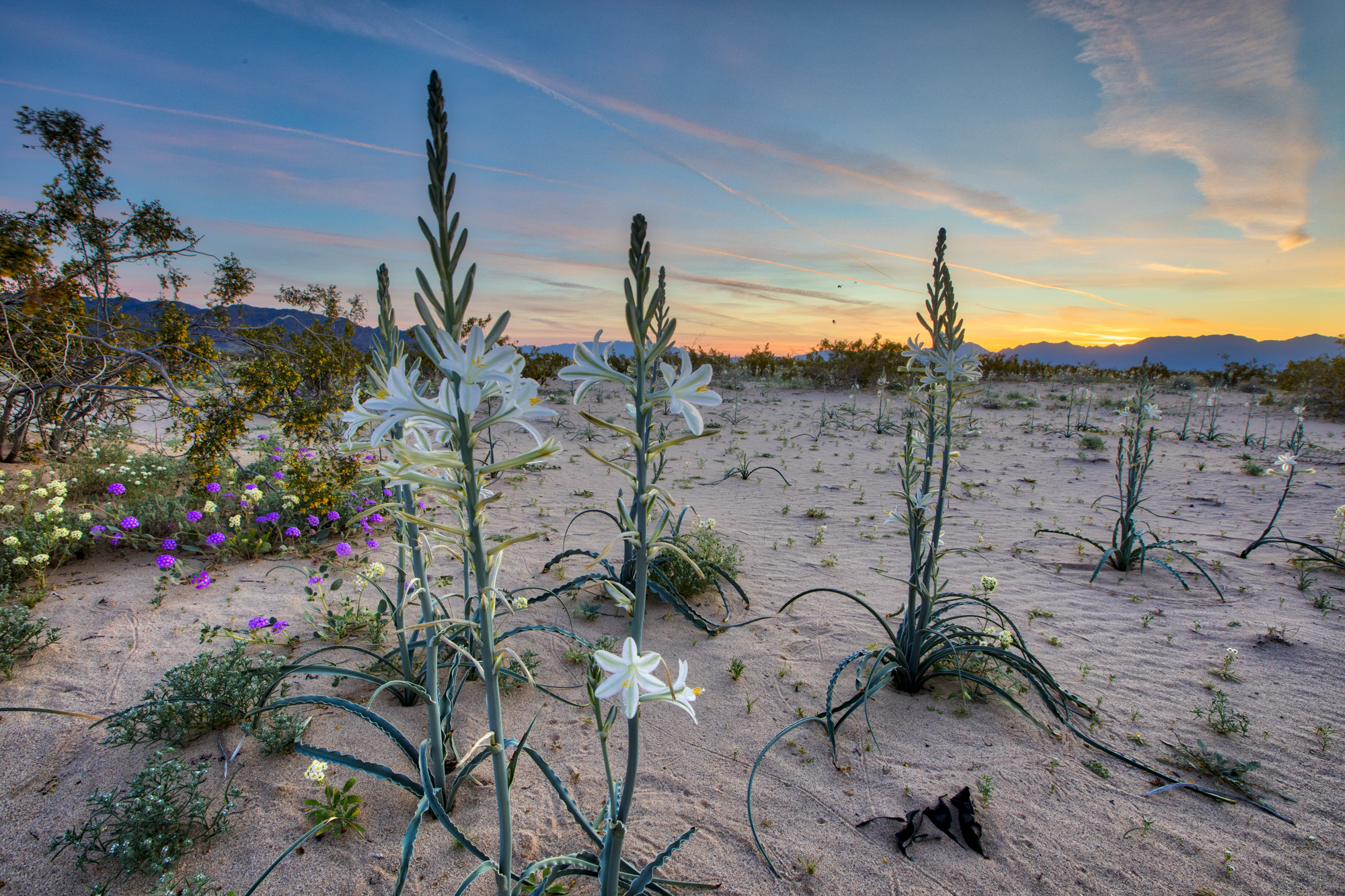
BLM Desert Lily Preserve near Desert Center, California

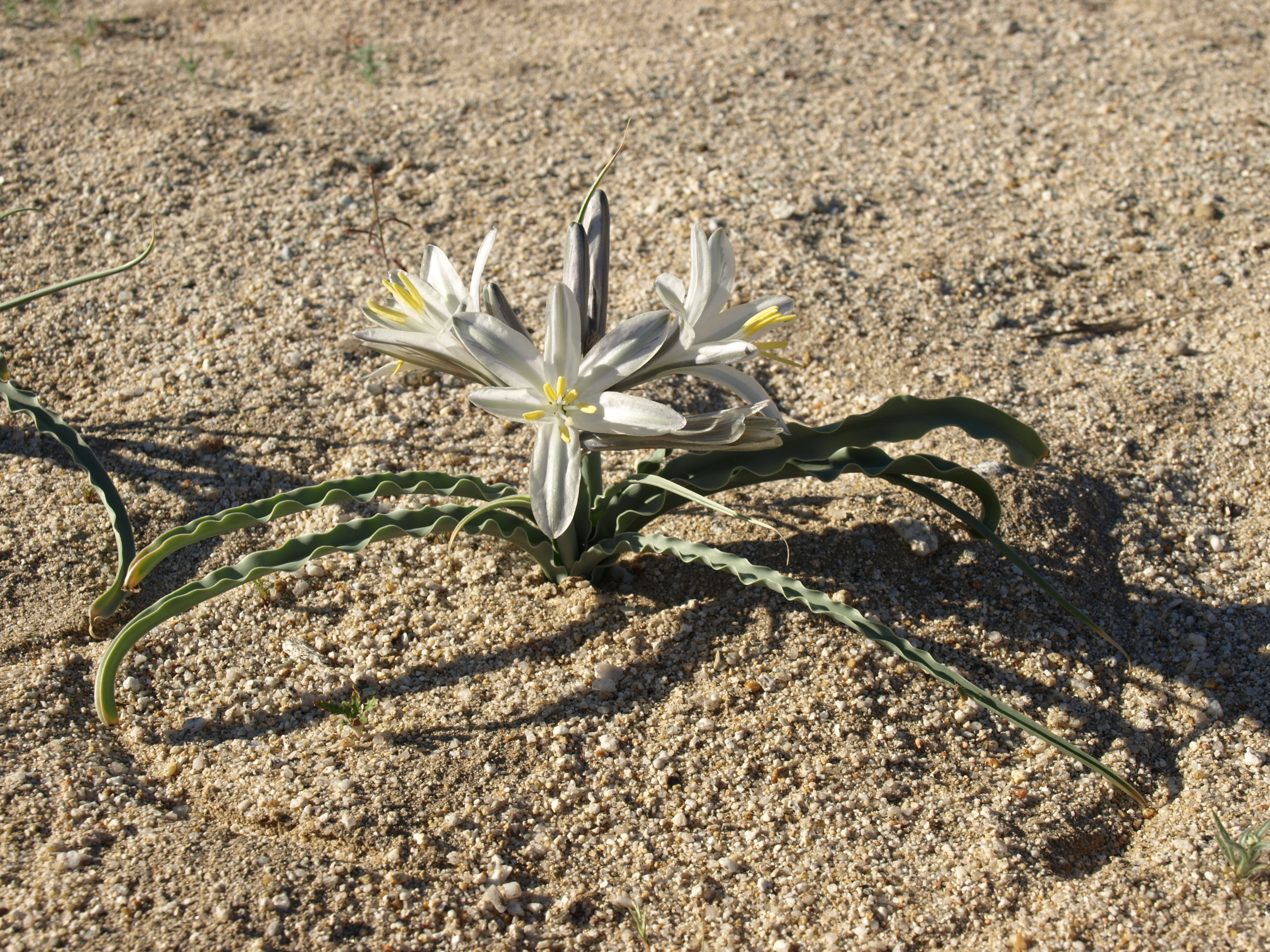
H. undulata growing in Vallecito Mountains, elevation 420 metres (1,380 ft)

== Taxonomy ==
In the APG III system, adopted here, Hesperocallis is placed in the family Asparagaceae, subfamily Agavoideae, since recent molecular systematic studies (Pires et al. 2004) have confirmed a close relationship with Agave. Other classifications have included the species in its own family, Hemerocallidaceae, or placed it in the Hostaceae (Funkiaceae); both families are submerged into the Agavoideae in the APG III system. As with many of the 'lilioid monocots', prior to the use of molecular evidence in classification, it was placed in the Liliaceae.

== Uses ==
The bulbs of the desert lily are eaten by native peoples.
