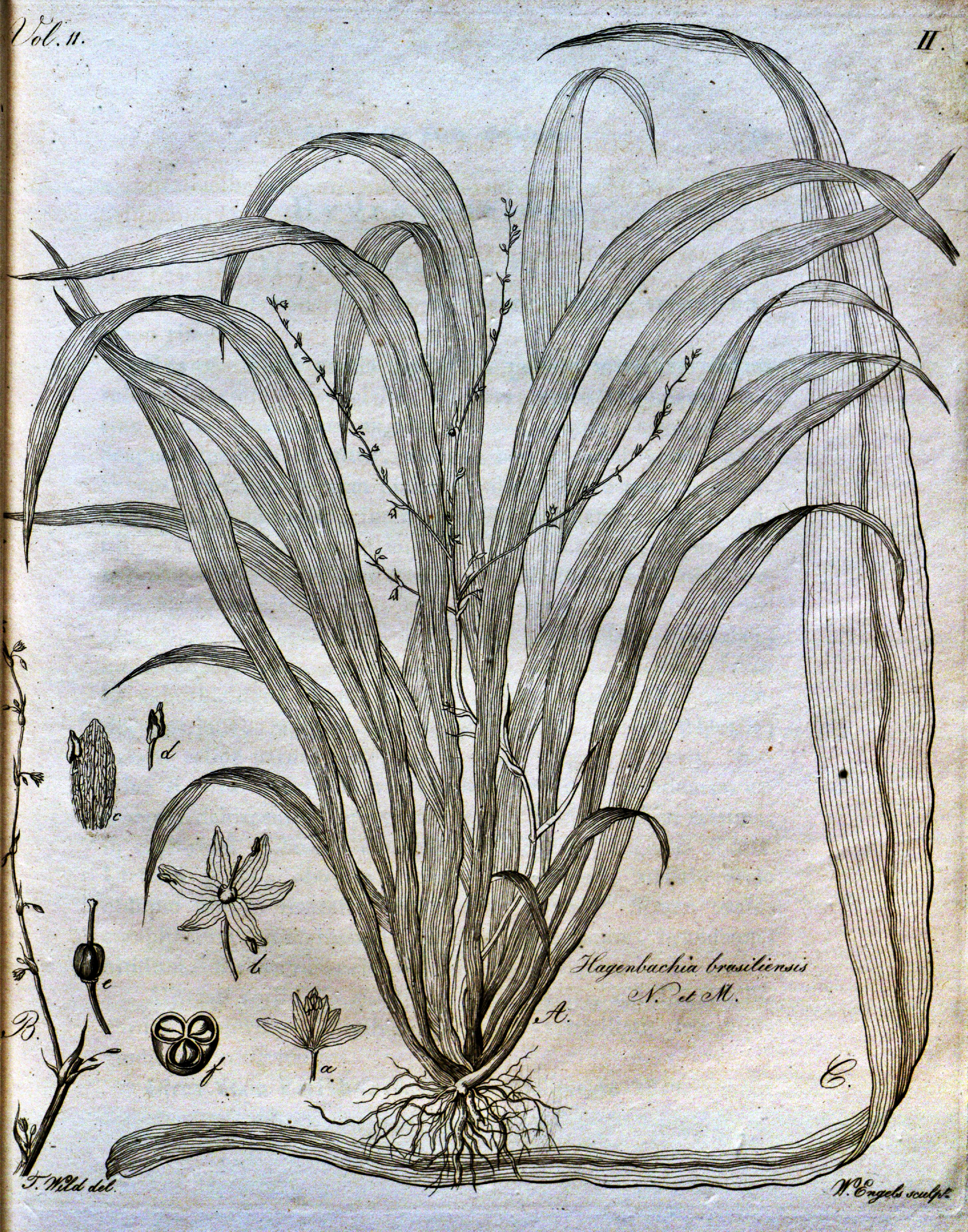
- Hagenbachia brasiliensis botanical illustration

Scientific classification
- Kingdom: Plantae
- Clade: Tracheophytes
- Clade: Angiosperms
- Clade: Monocots
- Order: Asparagales
- Family: Asparagaceae
- Subfamily: Agavoideae
- Genus: Hagenbachia; Nees & Mart.

Type species
- Hagenbachia brasiliensis Nees & Mart.

= Hagenbachia =

Genus of flowering plants

Hagenbachia is a genus of plants in the Agavoideae. It is native to Central America and tropical South America. The genus is name after Carl Friedrich Hagenbach.

- Hagenbachia brasiliensis Nees & Mart. - Brazil
- Hagenbachia columbiana Cruden - Colombia
- Hagenbachia ecuadorensis Cruden - Ecuador
- Hagenbachia hassleriana (Baker) Cruden - Paraguay, Bolivia
- Hagenbachia matogrossensis (Poelln.) Ravenna - Brazil, Bolivia, Paraguay
- Hagenbachia panamensis (Standl.) Cruden - Costa Rica, Panama, Colombia, Ecuador
