= Herreriopsis =

Scientific classification
- Kingdom: Plantae
- Clade: Tracheophytes
- Clade: Angiosperms
- Clade: Monocots
- Order: Asparagales
- Family: Asparagaceae
- Subfamily: Agavoideae
- Genus: Herreriopsis; H.Perrier
- Species: H. elegans

Binomial name
- Herreriopsis elegans H.Perrier

Genus of flowering plants

Herreriopsis is a monotypic genus of flowering plants in the family Asparagaceae. It is endemic to Madagascar. In the APG III classification system, the genus is placed in the family Asparagaceae, subfamily Agavoideae (formerly the family Agavaceae). The sole species is Herreriopsis elegans.
