= Petronymphe =

Scientific classification
- Kingdom: Plantae
- Clade: Tracheophytes
- Clade: Angiosperms
- Clade: Monocots
- Order: Asparagales
- Family: Asparagaceae
- Subfamily: Brodiaeoideae
- Genus: Petronymphe; H.E.Moore
- Petronymphe is endemic to Southwest Mexico

Genus of flowering plants

Petronymphe is a genus of flowering plants in the family Asparagaceae. It was first formally described by Harold Emery Moore in 1951. It is placed in the subfamily Brodiaeoideae. It is endemic to southwest Mexico.

== Species ==
It consists of two species:

- Petronymphe decora H.E.Moore
- Petronymphe rara J.Gut.

== Distribution ==
Petronymphe rara is endemic to the Mexican state of Oaxaca, and Petronymphe decora is endemic to Guerrero.
