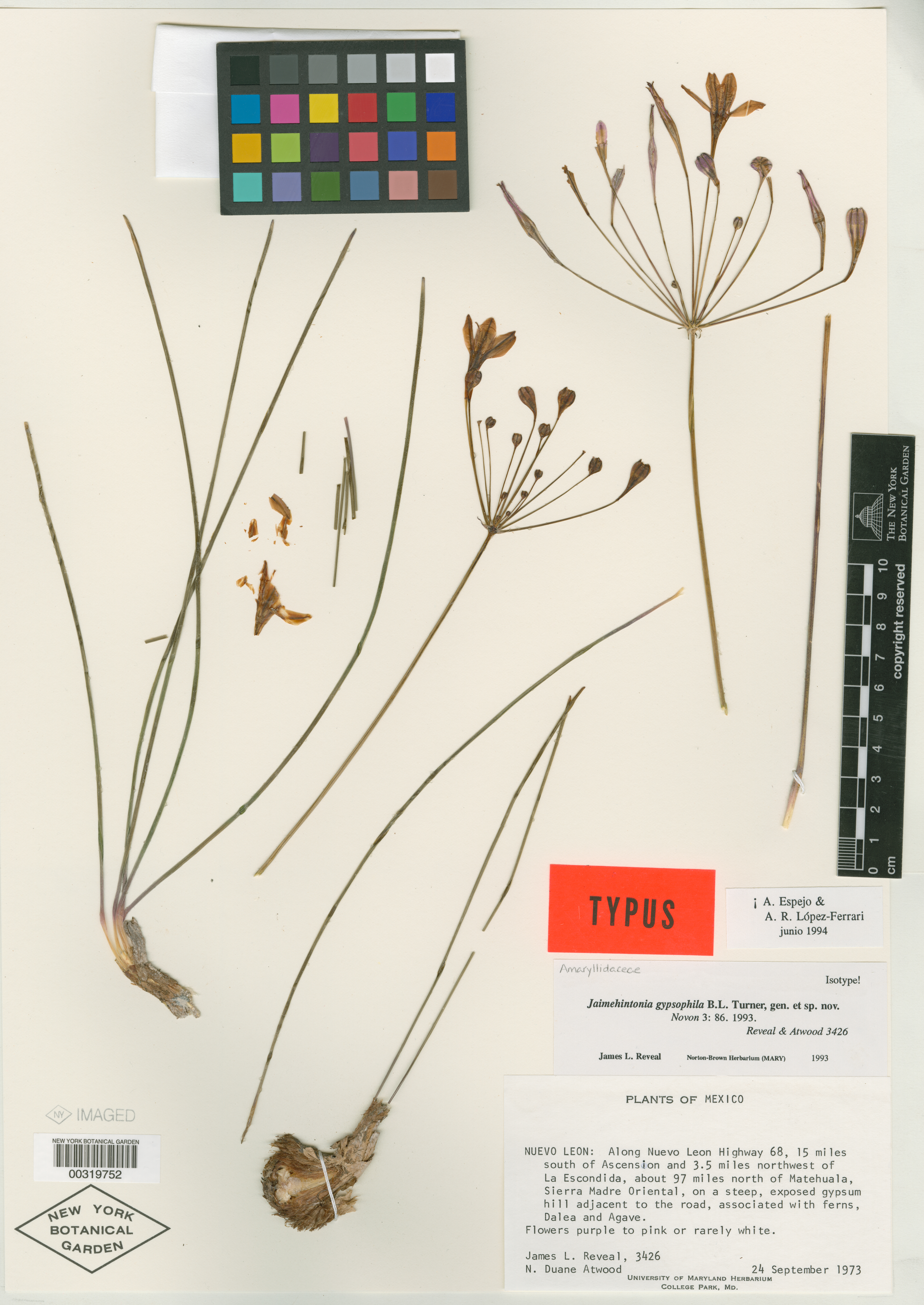

Scientific classification
- Kingdom: Plantae
- Clade: Tracheophytes
- Clade: Angiosperms
- Clade: Monocots
- Order: Asparagales
- Family: Asparagaceae
- Subfamily: Brodiaeoideae
- Genus: Jaimehintonia; B.L.Turner
- Species: J. gypsophila

Binomial name
- Jaimehintonia gypsophila B.L.Turner

= Jaimehintonia =

Genus of flowering plants

Jaimehintonia is a genus of plants in the family Asparagaceae, subfamily Brodiaeoideae, first described in 1993. It contains only one known species, Jaimehintonia gypsophila, endemic to the State of Nuevo León in northeastern Mexico.
