= Behria =

Scientific classification
- Kingdom: Plantae
- Clade: Tracheophytes
- Clade: Angiosperms
- Clade: Monocots
- Order: Asparagales
- Family: Asparagaceae
- Subfamily: Brodiaeoideae
- Genus: Behria; Greene

Species
- Behria leonis E.Gándara & Ruiz-Sanchez; Behria tenuiflora Greene

Genus of flowering plants

Behria is a genus of flowering plants in the family Asparagaceae. It includes two species native to Baja California Sur.

- Behria leonis E.Gándara & Ruiz-Sanchez
- Behria tenuiflora Greene
