= Dandya purpusii =

Scientific classification
- Kingdom: Plantae
- Clade: Tracheophytes
- Clade: Angiosperms
- Clade: Monocots
- Order: Asparagales
- Family: Asparagaceae
- Subfamily: Brodiaeoideae
- Genus: Dandya; H.E.Moore
- Species: D. purpusii

Binomial name
- Dandya purpusii (Brandegee) H.E.Moore

Synonyms
- Bloomeria purpusii (Brandegee) J.F.Macbr.; Brodiaea purpusii (Brandegee) J.W.Ingram; Muilla purpusii Brandegee

Genus of flowering plants

Dandya purpusii is a species of flowering plant endemic to northeastern Mexico. It is the only species in the genus Dandya. In the APG III classification system, it is placed in the asparagus family Asparagaceae, and the cluster lily subfamily Brodiaeoideae (formerly the family Themidaceae). The genus is named in honor of James Edgar Dandy.
