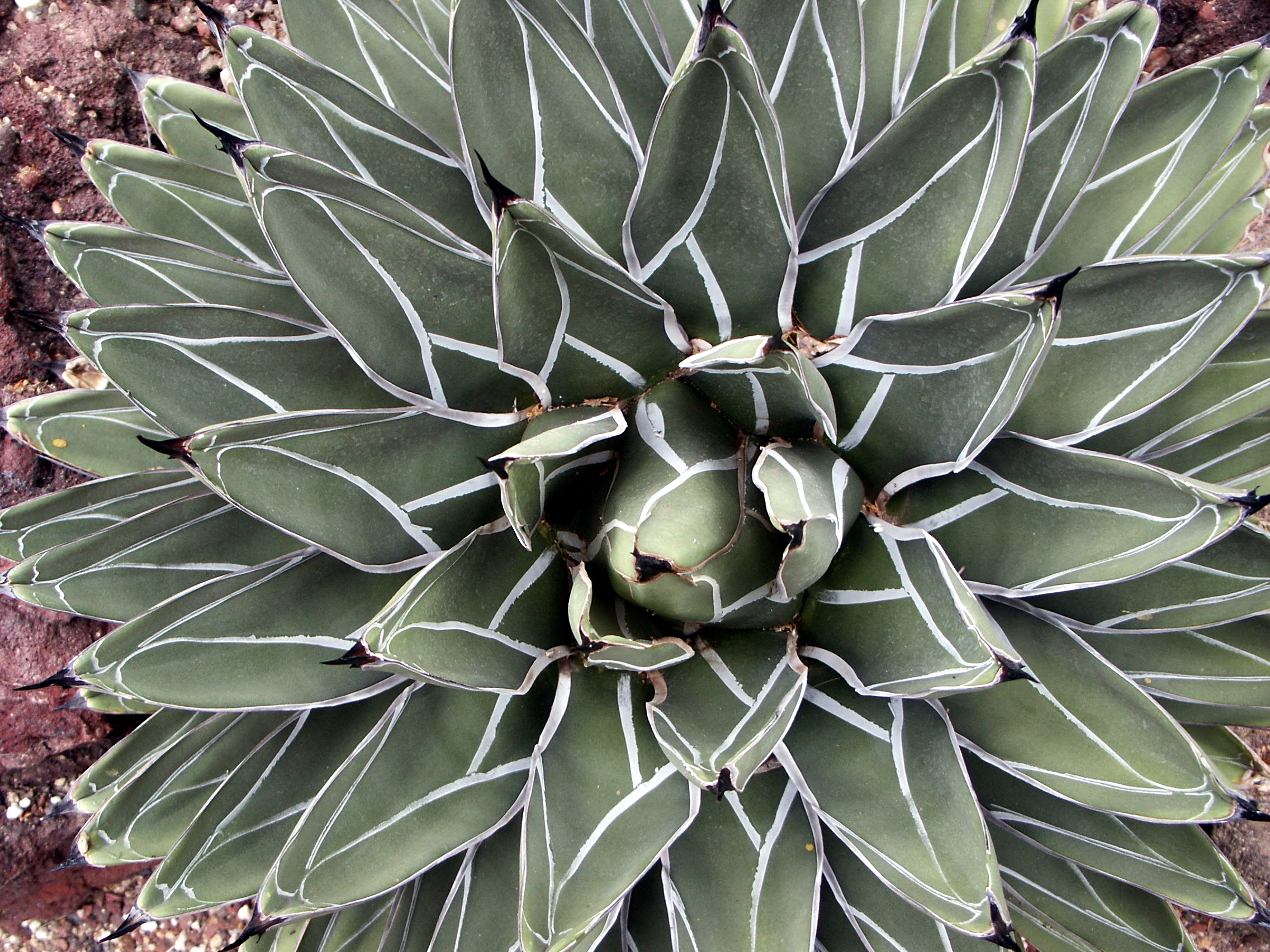
- Agave victoriae-reginae

Scientific classification
- Kingdom: Plantae
- Clade: Tracheophytes
- Clade: Angiosperms
- Clade: Monocots
- Order: Asparagales
- Family: Asparagaceae
- Subfamily: Agavoideae; Herb

Type genus
- Agave L.

Genera
- See text

= Agavoideae =

Subfamily of plants

Agavoideae is a subfamily of monocot flowering plants in the family Asparagaceae, order Asparagales. It has previously been treated as a separate family, Agavaceae.

The group includes many well-known desert and dry-zone types, such as the agaves and yuccas (including the Joshua tree). About 640 species are placed in around 23 genera; they are widespread in the tropical, subtropical, and warm temperate regions of the world.

== Description and uses ==
Species may be succulent or not. In general, Agavoideae leaves occur as rosettes at the end of a woody stem, which may range from extremely short to tree-like heights, as in the Joshua tree. The leaves are parallel-veined, and usually appear long and pointed, often with a hardened spine on the end, and sometimes with additional spines along the margins.

Agave species are used to make tequila, pulque, and mezcal, while others are valued for their fibers. They are quite popular for xeriscaping, as many have showy flowers.

== Systematics ==
The taxonomy of the group has varied widely. In the APG III system of 2009, adopted here, the Agavoideae are defined very broadly to include the former family Agavaceae along with other formerly separate families such as Anemarrhenaceae, Chlorogalaceae, Hostaceae, Yuccaceae, Anthericaceae, and Hesperocallidaceae, based on data from molecular systematics. Stevens comments that "The broad concept of Agavoideae [...] may not seem very satisfactory" but that none of the alternatives is better. Sources prior to 2009 will still have Agavaceae (in varying circumscriptions) as a separate family and may contain varying numbers of other families included in the Agavoideae in the APG III system.

Some genera formerly placed in this group (under whatever name) have been separated off; e.g. Dracaena, which superficially resembles some species of Agave, is currently placed in the subfamily Convallarioideae.

== Genera ==
A partial list of the genera included in the Agavoideae is given below. The reference is to the source that places the genus in this subfamily. As noted above, the genera currently included here have varied widely in their limits and assignment to families and subfamilies; some former family placements other than Agavaceae found in the literature are given below.

Genus	Former family placement(s) outside Agavaceae/Agavoideae
Agave L.
Anemarrhena Bunge	Anemarrhenaceae
Anthericum L.	Anthericaceae
Behnia Didr.	Behniaceae, Philesiaceae
Beschorneria Kunth
Camassia Lindl.	Chlorogalaceae, Hyacinthaceae
Chlorogalum (Lindl.) Kunth	Chlorogalaceae, Hyacinthaceae
Chlorophytum Ker Gawl.	Anthericaceae
Clara Kunth	Herreriaceae
Diamena Ravenna
Diora Ravenna	Anthericaceae
Diuranthera Hemsl.
Echeandia Ortega	Anthericaceae
Echinoagave A.Vázquez, Rosales & García-Mor.
Eremocrinum M.E.Jones
Furcraea Vent.
Hagenbachia Nees & Mart.
Hastingsia S.Watson	Chlorogalaceae, Hyacinthaceae
Herreria Ruiz & Pav.	Herreriaceae
Herreriopsis H.Perrier	Herreriaceae
Hesperaloe Engelm. in S.Watson
Hesperocallis A.Gray	Hesperocallidaceae, Hyacinthaceae
Hesperoyucca (Engelm.) Trel. (included in Yucca by some sources)	Yuccaceae
Hosta Tratt.	Hostaceae
Leucocrinum Nutt. ex A.Gray	Anthericaceae
Manfreda Salisb. (included in Agave by some sources)
Paleoagave A.Vázquez, Rosales & García-Mor.
Paraagave A.Vázquez, Rosales & García-Mor.
Paradisea Mazzuc.	Asphodelaceae
Polianthes L. (included in Agave by some sources)
Prochnyanthes S.Watson
Schoenolirion Durand	Chlorogalaceae, Hyacinthaceae
Trihesperus Herb.
Yucca L. (including Samuela)	Yuccaceae

== See also ==
- List of foliage plant diseases (Agavaceae)

== Sources ==
- David J. Bogler, J. Chris Pires and Javier Francisco-Ortega (2006). "Phylogeny of Agavaceae based on ndhF, rbcL, and ITS sequences: implications of molecular data for classification". Aliso. 22 (Monocots: Comparative Biology and Evolution): 313–328.
- David J. Bogler and Beryl B. Simpson (1995). "A Chloroplast DNA Study of the Agavaceae". Systematic Botany. 20 (2): 191–205. doi:10.2307/2419449. JSTOR 2419449.
- David J. Bogler and Beryl B. Simpson (September 1996). "Phylogeny of Agavaceae Based on ITS rDNA Sequence Variation". American Journal of Botany. 83 (9): 1225–1235. doi:10.2307/2446206. JSTOR 2446206.
