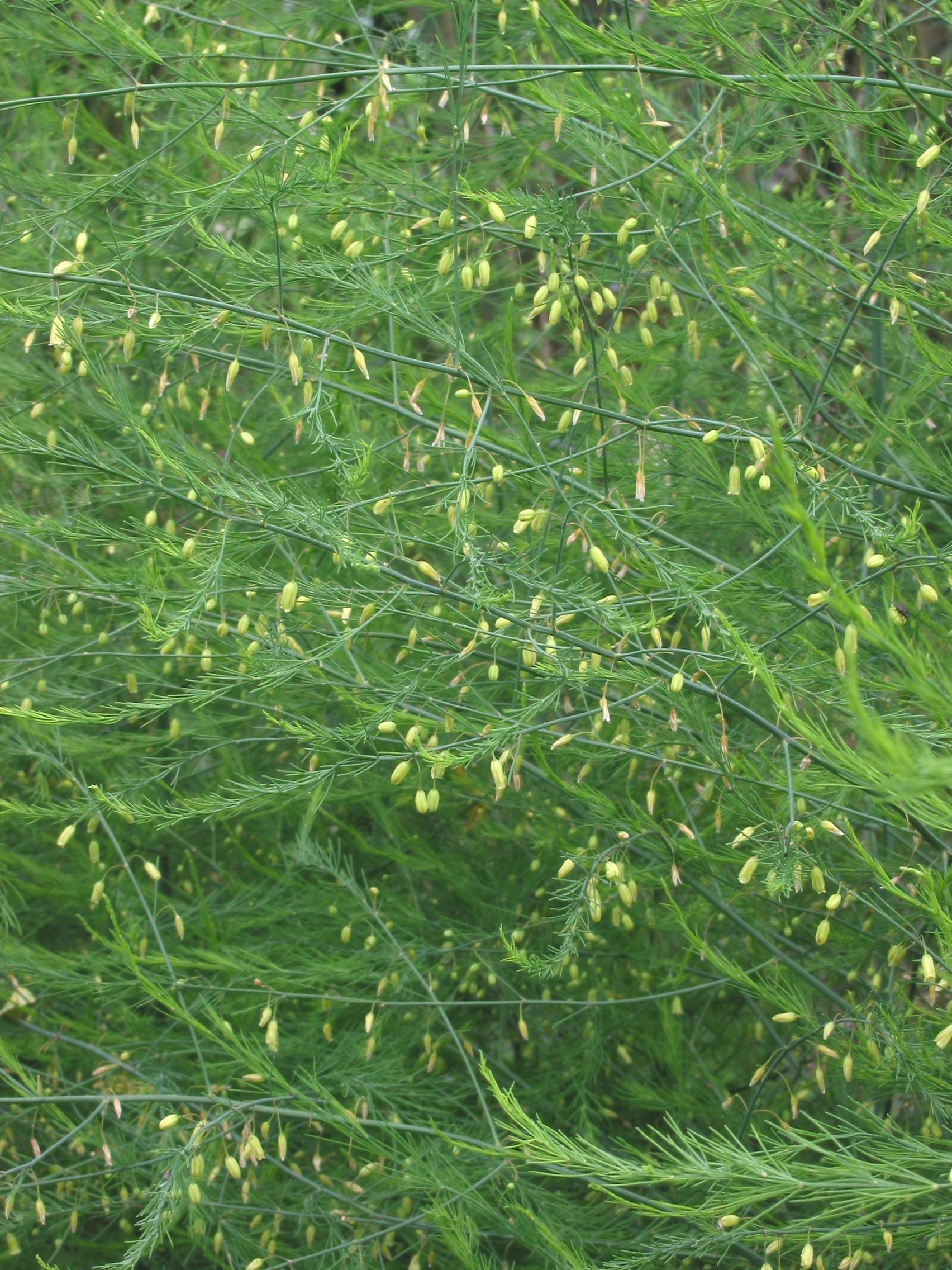
- Asparagus officinalis flowering

Scientific classification
- Kingdom: Plantae
- Clade: Tracheophytes
- Clade: Angiosperms
- Clade: Monocots
- Order: Asparagales
- Family: Asparagaceae; Juss.

Genera
- See text

Synonyms
- Asparageae

= Asparagaceae =

Family of plants

Asparagaceae (/əsˌpærəˈɡeɪsiˌaɪ, -siːˌiː/), known as the asparagus family, is a family of flowering plants, placed in the order Asparagales of the monocots. The family name is based on the edible garden asparagus, Asparagus officinalis. This family includes both common garden plants as well as common houseplants. The garden plants include asparagus, yucca, bluebell, lily of the valley, agave‚ and hosta, and the houseplants include snake plant, corn cane, spider plant, and plumosus fern.

The Asparagaceae is a morphologically heterogenous family with the included species varying widely in their appearance and growth form. It has a cosmopolitan distribution, with genera and species contained in the family native to all continents except Antarctica.

== Taxonomy ==
=== Early taxonomy ===
The plant family Asparagaceae was first named, described, and published in Genera Plantarum in 1789 by the French botanist Antoine Laurent de Jussieu, who is particularly noted for his work in developing the concept of plant families. From the time of first introduction until the 21st century, the Asparagaceae was a monotypic family containing only the single genus, Asparagus, after which the family was named.

=== Asparagaceae under the APG II system ===
In 2003, the formation of the APG II plant classification system radically expanded the Asparagaceae to include the genera and species previously contained in seven plant families. In the APG II system, two options were provided as to the circumscription of the family, with Asparagaceae sensu lato (meaning in the wider sense) being the broader circumscription of the family documented in the APG II; or, Asparagaceae sensu stricto (meaning in the strict sense) consisting of only Asparagus and Hemiphylacus. If opting to use Asparagaceae sensu lato, the paper outlining the APG II system recommended placing the previously recognised family in parentheses after Asparagaceae. The paper also recommended including grouping the families Anemarrhenaceae, Anthericaeae, Behniaceae and Herreriaceae with the Agavaceae, noting that in 2000, the Convallariaceae, Dracaenaceae, Eriospermaceae and Nolinaceae had been grouped together in the Ruscaceae.

Asparagaceae under the APG II system
| Family | Previously recognised families optionally included in APG II | Notes |
|---|---|---|
| Asparagaceae (sensu lato) | Agavaceae | Includes: Anemarrhenaceae Anthericaeae Behniaceae Herreriaceae |
| Asparagaceae (sensu lato) | Aphyllanthaceae | |
| Asparagaceae (sensu lato) | Asparagaceae (sensu stricto) | |
| Asparagaceae (sensu lato) | Hyacinthaceae | |
| Asparagaceae (sensu lato) | Laxmanniaceae | |
| Asparagaceae (sensu lato) | Ruscaceae | Includes: Convallariaceae Dracaenaceae Eriospermaceae Nolinaceae |
| Asparagaceae (sensu lato) | Themidaceae | |

=== Asparagaceae under the APG III system ===
In 2009, botanists proposed a major revision of the Asparagales order of plants, that included a vast expansion of three constituent plant families; the Amaryllidaceae, Asparagaceae and Xanthorrhoeaceae, to include large number of genera in former plant families by placing them into subfamilies nested within these three plant families. Under the APG III system, the Asparagaceae contain seven subfamilies, and unlike the APG II system, Asparagaceae was only circumscribed in the broad sense (sensu lato), but the Asparagaceae subfamily Asparagoideae is roughly equivalent to Asparagaceae (sensu stricto) under the APG II system. Whilst the subfamilies are broadly equivalent to the previous subdivision by families under the APG II system, genera previously included in one previously recognised family may have moved to another subfamily under the APG III system, or even placed into another family outside of the Asparagaceae.

Asparagaceae under the APG III system
| Family | Subfamily | Previous subdivision under the APG II system |
|---|---|---|
| Asparagaceae | Agavoideae | Agavaceae |
| Asparagaceae | Aphyllanthoideae | Aphyllanthaceae |
| Asparagaceae | Asparagoideae | Asparagaceae (sensu stricto) |
| Asparagaceae | Scilloideae | Hyacinthaceae |
| Asparagaceae | Lomandroideae | Laxmanniaceae |
| Asparagaceae | Convallarioideae (formerly Nolinoideae) | Ruscaceae |
| Asparagaceae | Brodiaeoideae | Themidaceae |

== Genera ==
As of July 2025, the family Asparagaceae includes 126 genera; and these genera contain approximately 3,170 accepted species altogether, although the number of accepted genera and their constituent species varies depending on authority and changes with time. The reference against the subfamily name is to the source which places the genus in that subfamily. (References may use the former subfamily name Nolinoideae rather than Convallarioideae.)

Asparagaceae genera
| Subfamily | Genus |
|---|---|
| Lomandroideae | Acanthocarpus Lehm. |
| Agavoideae | Agave L. |
| Scilloideae | Albuca L. (sometimes included in Ornithogalum) |
| Scilloideae | Alrawia (Wendelbo) Perss. & Wendelbo |
| Brodiaeoideae | Androstephium Torr. |
| Agavoideae | Anemarrhena Bunge |
| Agavoideae | Anthericum L. |
| Aphyllanthoideae | Aphyllanthes L. |
| Lomandroideae | Arthropodium R.Br. |
| Asparagoideae | Asparagus Tourn. ex L. |
| Convallarioideae | Aspidistra Ker Gawl. (including Antherolophus Gagnep., Colania Gagnep.) |
| Scilloideae | Autonoe (Webb & Berthel.) Speta |
| Scilloideae | Barnardia Lindl. |
| Convallarioideae | Beaucarnea Lem. (including Calibanus Rose.) |
| Agavoideae | Behnia Didr. |
| Brodiaeoideae | Behria Greene |
| Scilloideae | Bellevalia Lapeyr. (including Strangweja Bertol.) |
| Agavoideae | Beschorneria Kunth |
| Brodiaeoideae | Bessera Schult.f. |
| Brodiaeoideae | Bloomeria Kellogg |
| Scilloideae | Bowiea Harv. ex Hook.f. (Climbing Onion, Sea Onion) |
| Scilloideae | Brimeura Salisb. |
| Brodiaeoideae | Brodiaea Sm. |
| Agavoideae | Camassia Lindl. |
| Lomandroideae | Chamaexeros Benth. |
| Agavoideae | Chlorogalum (Lindl.) Kunth |
| Agavoideae | Chlorophytum Ker Gawl. |
| Agavoideae | Clara Kunth |
| Convallarioideae | Comospermum Rauschert |
| Convallarioideae | Convallaria L. |
| Lomandroideae | Cordyline Comm. ex R.Br. (including Cohnia Kunth) |
| Convallarioideae | Danae Medik. |
| Brodiaeoideae | Dandya H.E.Moore |
| Convallarioideae | Dasylirion Zucc. |
| Scilloideae | Daubenya Lindl. (including Amphisiphon W.F.Barker, Androsiphon Schltr.) |
| Agavoideae | Diamena Ravenna |
| Brodiaeoideae | Dichelostemma Kunth (including Brevoortia, Stropholirion) |
| Lomandroideae | Dichopogon Kunth (may be included in Arthropodium) |
| Agavoideae | Diora Ravenna |
| Scilloideae | Dipcadi Medik. (sometimes included in Ornithogalum) |
| Brodiaeoideae | Dipterostemon Rydb. |
| Convallarioideae | Disporopsis Hance |
| Agavoideae | Diuranthera Hemsl. |
| Convallarioideae | Dracaena Vand. ex L. (including Sansevieria Thunb) |
| Scilloideae | Drimia Jacq. (including Litanthus Harv., Rhadamanthus Salisb., Rhodocodon Baker, Schizobasis Baker, Sypharissa Salisb., Tenicroa Raf., Thuranthos C.H.Wright, Urginea Steinh., Urgineopsis Compton) |
| Scilloideae | Drimiopsis Lindl. & Paxton (sometimes included in Ledebouria) |
| Agavoideae | Echeandia Ortega |
| Agavoideae | Echinoagave A.Vázquez, Rosales & García-Mor. |
| Agavoideae | Eremocrinum M.E.Jones |
| Convallarioideae | Eriospermum Jacq. |
| Scilloideae | Eucomis L'Hér. |
| Lomandroideae | Eustrephus R.Br. |
| Scilloideae | Fessia Speta |
| Agavoideae | Furcraea Vent. |
| Scilloideae | Galtonia Decne. (included in Ornithogalum L. by Plants of the World Online and other sources) |
| Agavoideae | Hagenbachia Nees & Mart. |
| Agavoideae | Hastingsia S.Watson |
| Asparagoideae | Hemiphylacus S.Watson |
| Agavoideae | Herreria Ruiz & Pav. |
| Agavoideae | Herreriopsis H.Perrier |
| Agavoideae | Hesperaloe Engelm. in S.Watson |
| Agavoideae | Hesperocallis A.Gray |
| Agavoideae | Hesperoyucca (Engelm.) Trel. (included in Yucca by some sources) |
| Convallarioideae | Heteropolygonatum M.N.Tamura & Ogisu |
| Agavoideae | Hooveria D.W.Taylor & D.J.Keil |
| Agavoideae | Hosta Tratt. |
| Scilloideae | Hyacinthella Schur |
| Scilloideae | Hyacinthoides Heist. ex Fabr. (including Endymion Dumort.) |
| Scilloideae | Hyacinthus Tourn. ex L. |
| Brodiaeoideae | Jaimehintonia B.L.Turner |
| Scilloideae | Lachenalia Jacq. ex Murray (including Brachyscypha Baker, Periboea Kunth, Polyxena Kunth) |
| Lomandroideae | Laxmannia R.Br. (including Bartlingia F. Mueller) |
| Scilloideae | Ledebouria Roth (including Resnova van der Merwe) |
| Scilloideae | Leopoldia Parl. (included in Muscari Mill. by Plants of the World Online, may be treated as Muscari subg. Leopoldia) |
| Agavoideae | Leucocrinum Nutt. ex A.Gray |
| Convallarioideae | Liriope Lour. |
| Lomandroideae | Lomandra Labill. (including Xerotes R. Brown) |
| Convallarioideae | Maianthemum F.H.Wigg. (including Oligobotrya Baker, Smilacina Desf.) |
| Agavoideae | Manfreda Salisb. (included in Agave by some sources) |
| Scilloideae | Massonia Thunb. ex Houtt. (including Neobakeria Schltr., Whiteheadia Harv.) |
| Scilloideae | Merwilla Speta |
| Brodiaeoideae | Milla Cav. (including Diphalangium) |
| Brodiaeoideae | Muilla S.Watson ex Benth. |
| Scilloideae | Muscari Mill. (including Botryanthus Kunth, and Pseudomuscari Garbari & Greuter) |
| Scilloideae | Muscarimia Kostel. ex Losinsk. |
| Scilloideae | Namophila U.Müll.-Doblies & D.Müll.-Doblies |
| Convallarioideae | Nolina Michx. |
| Scilloideae | Occultia Stedje & Rulkens |
| Convallarioideae | Ophiopogon Ker Gawl. |
| Scilloideae | Ornithogalum L. (including Battandiera Maire, Elsiea F.M.Leight., Neopatersonia Schonl.) |
| Scilloideae | Oziroe Raf. (including Fortunatia J.F.Macbr.) |
| Agavoideae | Paleoagave A.Vázquez, Rosales & García-Mor. |
| Agavoideae | Paraagave A.Vázquez, Rosales & García-Mor. |
| Agavoideae | Paradisea Mazzuc. |
| Convallarioideae | Peliosanthes Andrews |
| Brodiaeoideae | Petronymphe H.E.Moore |
| Agavoideae | Polianthes L. (included in Agave by some sources) |
| Convallarioideae | Polygonatum Mill. |
| Agavoideae | Prochnyanthes S.Watson |
| Scilloideae | Prospero Salisb. |
| Scilloideae | Pseudogaltonia (Kuntze) Engl. (sometimes included in Ornithogalum) |
| Scilloideae | Pseudolachenalia G.D.Duncan |
| Scilloideae | Pseudoprospero Speta |
| Scilloideae | Puschkinia Adams |
| Convallarioideae | Reineckea Kunth |
| Scilloideae | Resnova van der Merwe |
| Convallarioideae | Rohdea Roth (including Campylandra Baker and Gonioscypha Baker) |
| Lomandroideae | Romnalda P.F.Stevens |
| Convallarioideae | Ruscus L. |
| Scilloideae | Schizocarphus van der Merwe |
| Agavoideae | Schoenolirion Durand |
| Scilloideae | Scilla L. (including Chionodoxa Boiss.) |
| Convallarioideae | Semele Kunth |
| Lomandroideae | Sowerbaea Sm. |
| Convallarioideae | Speirantha Baker |
| Scilloideae | Spetaea Wetschnig & Pfosser |
| Convallarioideae | Theropogon Maxim. |
| Lomandroideae | Thysanotus R.Br. (including Murchisonia Brittan) |
| Lomandroideae | Trichopetalum Lindl. (including Bottinaea Colla) |
| Agavoideae | Trihesperus Herb. |
| Brodiaeoideae | Triteleia Douglas ex Lindl. (including Hesperoscordium, Themis) |
| Brodiaeoideae | Triteleiopsis Hoover |
| Convallarioideae | Tupistra Ker Gawl. (including Tricalistra Ridl.) |
| Scilloideae | Veltheimia Gled. |
| Lomandroideae | Xerolirion A.S.George |
| Brodiaeoideae | Xochiquetzallia J.Gut |
| Agavoideae | Yucca L. (including Samuela Trel.) |
| Scilloideae | Zagrosia Speta |

=== Obsolete genera or species formerly included in the Asparagaceae ===
Calibanus was a former genus that was placed in the Asparagaceae (Convallarioideae subfamily) when the APG III system was introduced. Both members of the genus have since been transferred to the genus Beaucarnea (also a member of the Asparagaceae (Convallarioideae subfamily)) after molecular phylogenetic research demonstrated a strong phylogenetic relationship with species of Beaucarnea.

Sansevieria was a long recognised genus belonging to the Convallarioideae subfamily but on the basis of molecular phylogenetic studies, the species formerly including as belonging to the genus have been transferred to the genus Dracaena (also included in the Noliniodeae subfamily).

== Bibliography ==
- Chase, M.W.; Reveal, J.L. & Fay, M.F. (2009), "A subfamilial classification for the expanded asparagalean families Amaryllidaceae, Asparagaceae and Xanthorrhoeaceae", Botanical Journal of the Linnean Society, 161 (2): 132–136, doi:10.1111/j.1095-8339.2009.00999.x
- Pires, J. C.; Sytsma, K. J. (1 August 2002). "A phylogenetic evaluation of a biosystematic framework: Brodiaea and related petaloid monocots (Themidaceae)". American Journal of Botany. 89 (8): 1342–1359. doi:10.3732/ajb.89.8.1342. PMID 21665737.
