= List of Agave species =

As of May 2019, the World Checklist of Selected Plant Families and Plants of the World Online recognize about 270 species of Agave plus a number of natural hybrids. This includes species formerly placed in Manfreda and Polianthes. Other sources may use different circumscriptions.

== A ==
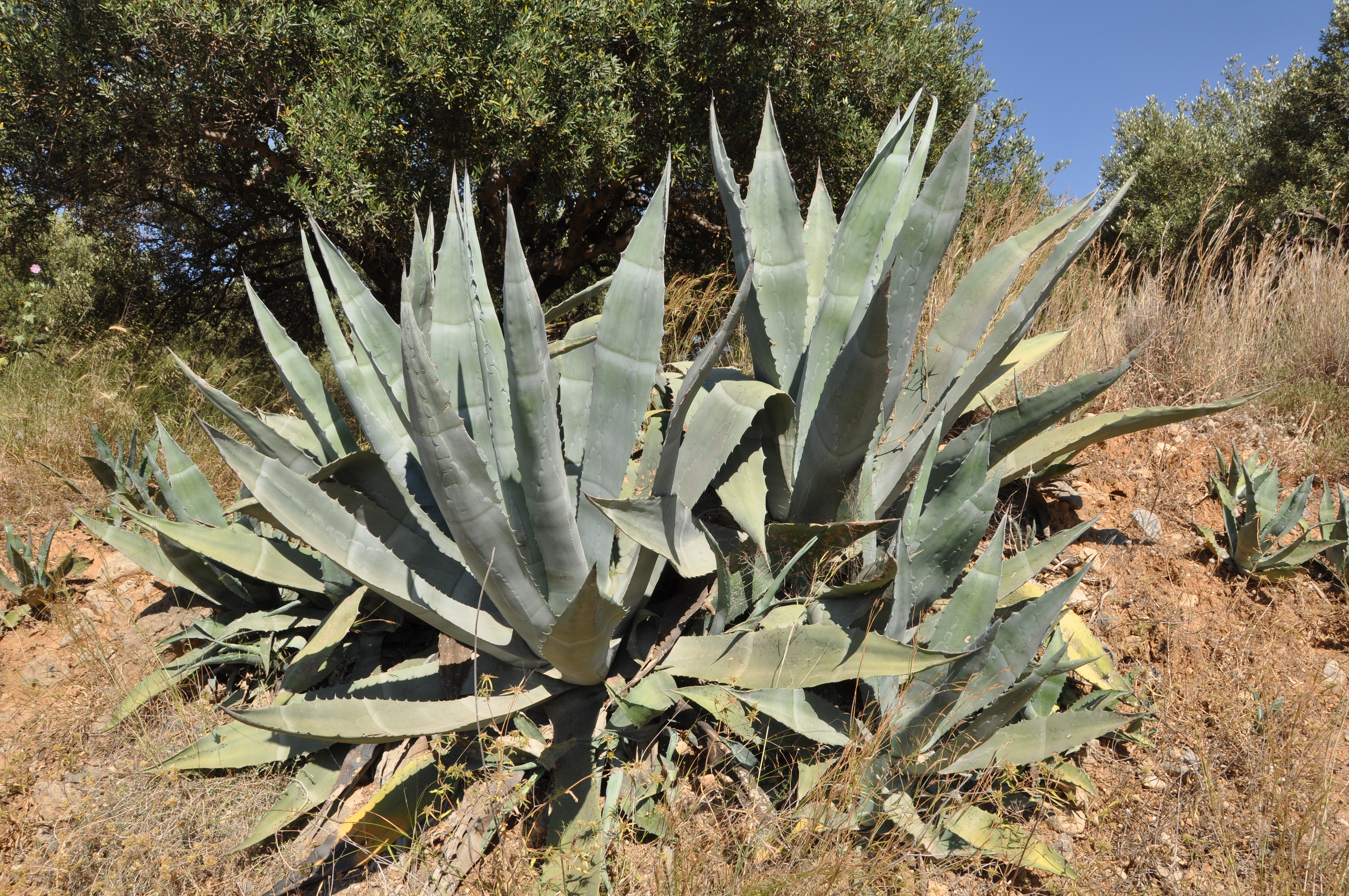
A. americana

- Agave abisaii A.Vázquez & Nieves – Mexico (Jalisco)
- Agave acicularis Trel. - Cuba
- Agave acklinicola Trel. - Bahamas
- Agave × ajoensis W.C.Hodgs. - Pima County in Arizona = A. deserti var. simplex × A. schottii var. schottii
- Agave aktites Gentry - Mexico (Sinaloa, Sonora)
- Agave albescens Trel. - Cuba
- Agave alboaustralis (E.Solano & Ríos-Gómez) Thiede - Oaxaca
- Agave albomarginata Gentry - northeastern Mexico
- Agave albopilosa I.Cabral - Mexico (Nuevo León)
- Agave americana L. – American Agave, American Century Plant, Century Plant, Maguey americano - Arizona, Texas, Mexico; naturalized in parts of Africa, Eurasia, Australia, South America various islands
- Agave amica (Medik.) Thiede & Govaerts – Mexico
- Agave andreae Sahagún & A.Vázquez – Mexico (Michoacán)
- Agave angustiarum Trel. - Mexico
- Agave angustifolia Haw. - Mexico, Central America; naturalized in Spain, South Africa, Indian Subcontinent, various islands
- Agave anomala Trel. - Bahamas, Cuba
- Agave antillarum Descourt. - Cuba, Hispaniola
- Agave apedicellata Thiede & Eggli – Mexico (Jalisco, San Luis Potosí)
- Agave applanata Lem. ex Jacobi - Mexico
- Agave arcedianoensis Cházaro - Mexico (Jalisco)
- Agave × arizonica Gentry & J.H.Weber = A. chrysantha × A. toumeyana var. bella - Arizona
- Agave arubensis Hummelinck - Aruba
- Agave asperrima Jacobi – Maguey spero, Rough Century Plant - Texas, Coahuila, Durango, Zacatecas
- Agave atrovirens Karw. ex Salm-Dyck - Oaxaca, Puebla, Veracruz
- Agave attenuata Salm-Dyck – Swan's Neck Agave, Dragon Tree Agave, Foxtail Agave - Mexico; naturalized in southeastern Australia
- Agave aurea Brandegee - Baja California Sur
- Agave avellanidens Trel. - Baja California
- Agave azurea R.H.Webb & G.D.Starr – Mexico (Baja California Sur)

== B ==
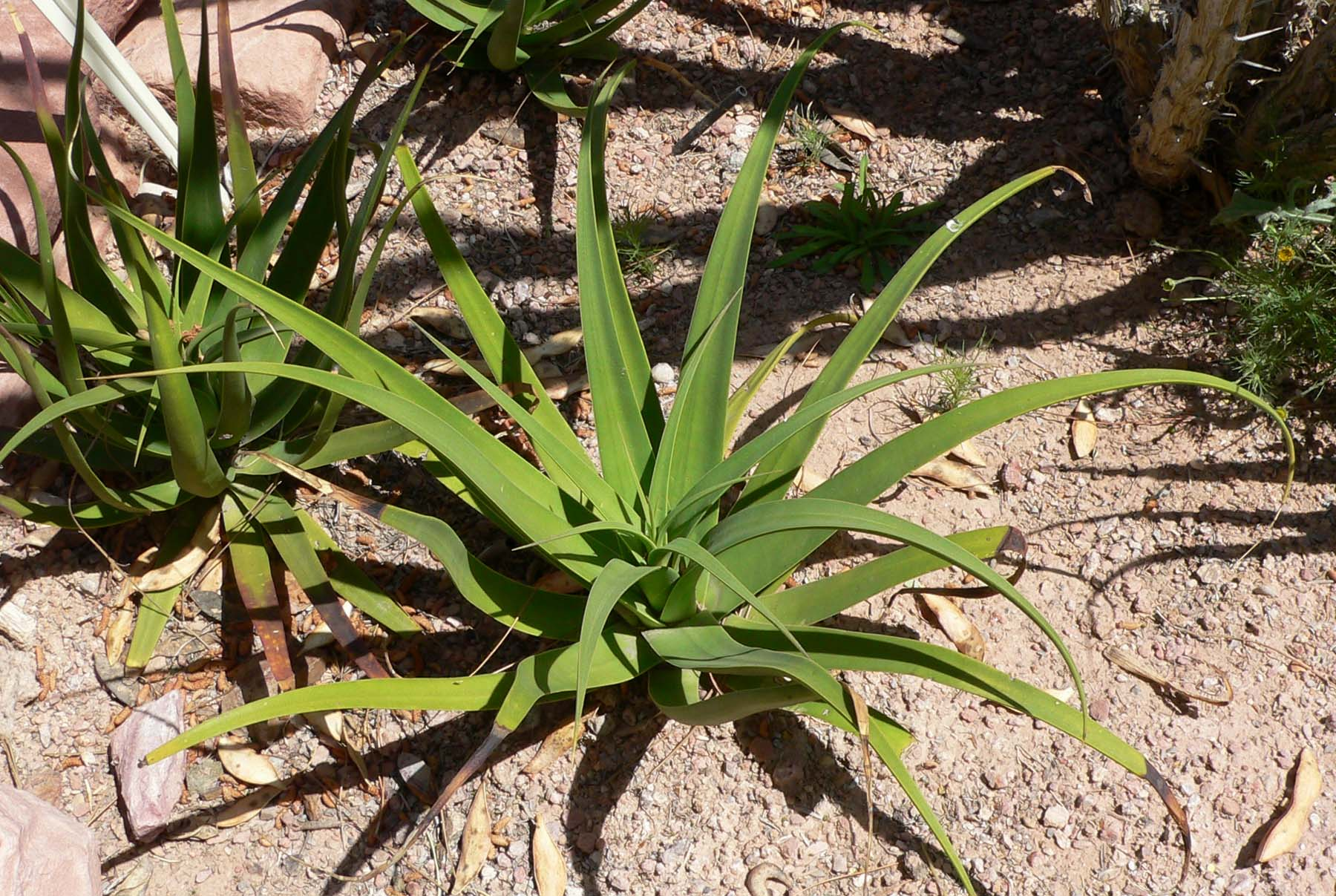
A. bracteosa

- Agave bahamana Trel. - Bahamas
- Agave beaulueriana Jacobi = Agave americana var. franzosini
- Agave bicolor (E.Solano & García-Mend.) Thiede & Eggli – Mexico (Oaxaca)
- Agave boldinghiana Trel. - Curaçao, Bonaire
- Agave bovicornuta Gentry – Cowhorn Agave - Chihuahua, Sinaloa, Sonora
- Agave braceana Trel. - Bahamas (Abaco)
- Agave bracteosa S.Watson ex Engelm. – Squid Agave - Mexico (Coahuila, Nuevo León)
- Agave brevipetala Trel. - Hispaniola
- Agave brevispina Trel. - Hispaniola
- Agave brittoniana Trel. - Cuba
- Agave brunnea S.Watson – NE. Mexico
- Agave bulbulifera (Castillejos & E.Solano) Thiede – Mexico (Guerrero)
- Agave bulliana (Baker) Thiede & Eggli - Mexico

== C ==
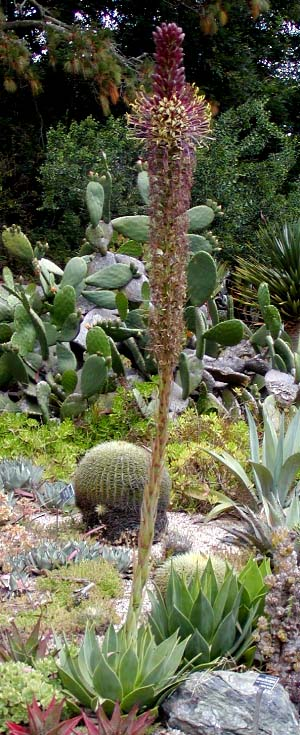
A. chiapensis

- Agave cacozela Trel. - Bahamas (Eleuthera)
- Agave cajalbanensis A.Álvarez - Cuba
- †Agave calodonta A.Berger - extinct
- Agave cantala (Haw.) Roxb. ex Salm-Dyck – Cantala, Maguey de la India - Mexico, El Salvador, Honduras
- Agave capensis Gentry - Baja California Sur = Agave aurea var. capensis
- Agave caribaeicola Trel. - Lesser Antilles
- Agave caymanensis Proctor - Cayman Islands
- Agave cerulata Trel. - Baja California
- Agave chamelensis (E.J.Lott & Verh.-Will.) Thiede & Eggli – Mexico (Jalisco)
- Agave chazaroi A.Vázquez & O.M.Valencia - Jalisco
- Agave chiapensis Jacobi - Oaxaca, Chiapas, Guatemala
- Agave chrysantha Peebles – Golden Flowered Agave, Golden Flower Century Plant - Arizona
- Agave chrysoglossa I.M.Johnst. - Baja California, Sonora
- Agave cocui Trel. - Colombia, Venezuela (incl Isla Margarita), Aruba, Bonaire, Curaçao
- Agave coetocapnia (M.Roem.) Govaerts & Thiede – Mexico
- Agave collina Greenm. - Morelos, Guerrero
- Agave colorata Gentry – Mescal ceniza - Sinaloa, Sonora
- Agave confertiflora Thiede & Eggli – Mexico (Chihuahua)
- Agave congesta Gentry - Chiapas
- Agave convallis Trel. - Oaxaca
- Agave cremnophila - Oaxaca
- Agave cryptica G.D.Starr & T.J.Davis - Mexico (Nuevo Leon, Tamaulipas)
- Agave cundinamarcensis A.Berger - Colombia
- Agave cupreata Trel. & A.Berger - Guerrero, Michoacán

== D ==
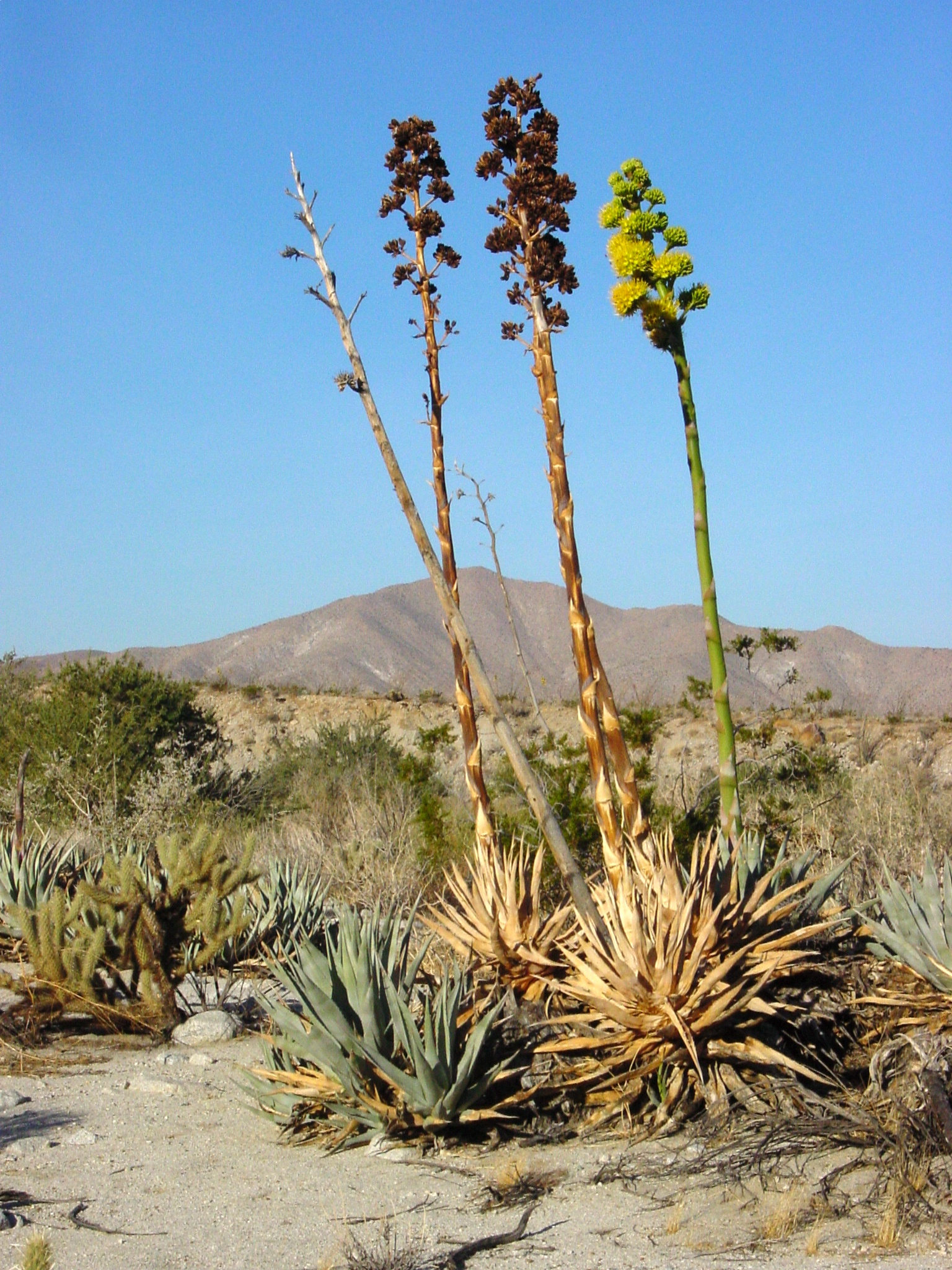
A. deserti

- Agave dasylirioides Jacobi & C.D.Bouché - Morelos, México State
- Agave datylio F.A.C.Weber - Baja California Sur
- Agave debilis A.Berger – C. & SW. Mexico (to Hidalgo)
- Agave decipiens Baker – False Sisal - Florida; naturalized in parts of Africa
- Agave delamateri W.C.Hodgs. & Slauson - Arizona
- Agave demeesteriana Jacobi - Sinaloa, Veracruz
- Agave deserti Engelm. – Desert Century Plant, Desert Agave, Maguey de Desierto - Baja California, California, Arizona
- Agave difformis A.Berger - Hidalgo, San Luis Potosí
- Agave doctorensis L.Hern. & Magallán – Mexico (Querétaro)
- Agave dolichantha Thiede & Eggli – Mexico (Jalisco, Michoacán)
- Agave durangensis Gentry - Durango, Zacatecas
- Agave dussiana Trel. - Lesser Antilles

== E ==
- Agave eggersiana Trel. – Eggers' Century Plant, St. Croix Agave - US Virgin Islands (St. Croix, St. Thomas)
- Agave ehrenbergii Jacobi - Cuba = Agave mitis Mart.
- Agave ellemeetiana Jacobi – Mexico (Veracruz, Oaxaca)
- Agave ensifera Jacobi
- Agave evadens Trel. - Trinidad, Venezuelan Antilles (Isla Margarita)

== F ==
- Agave felgeri Gentry – Mescalito - Sonora
- Agave filifera Salm-Dyck – Thread-leaf Agave - Querétaro to México State, Aguascalientes, Hidalgo, San Luis Potosí
- Agave flexispina Trel. - Chihuahua, Durango
- Agave fortiflora Gentry - Sonora
- Agave fourcroydes Lem. – Henequen, Maguey Henequen, Mexican Sisal - Mexico, Guatemala; naturalized in West Indies, Italy, Canary Islands
- Agave funkiana K.Koch & C.D.Bouché – Ixtle de Jaumav - Mexico (Tamaulipas to Chiapas)
- Agave fusca (Ravenna) Thiede & Eggli – Guatemala

== G ==
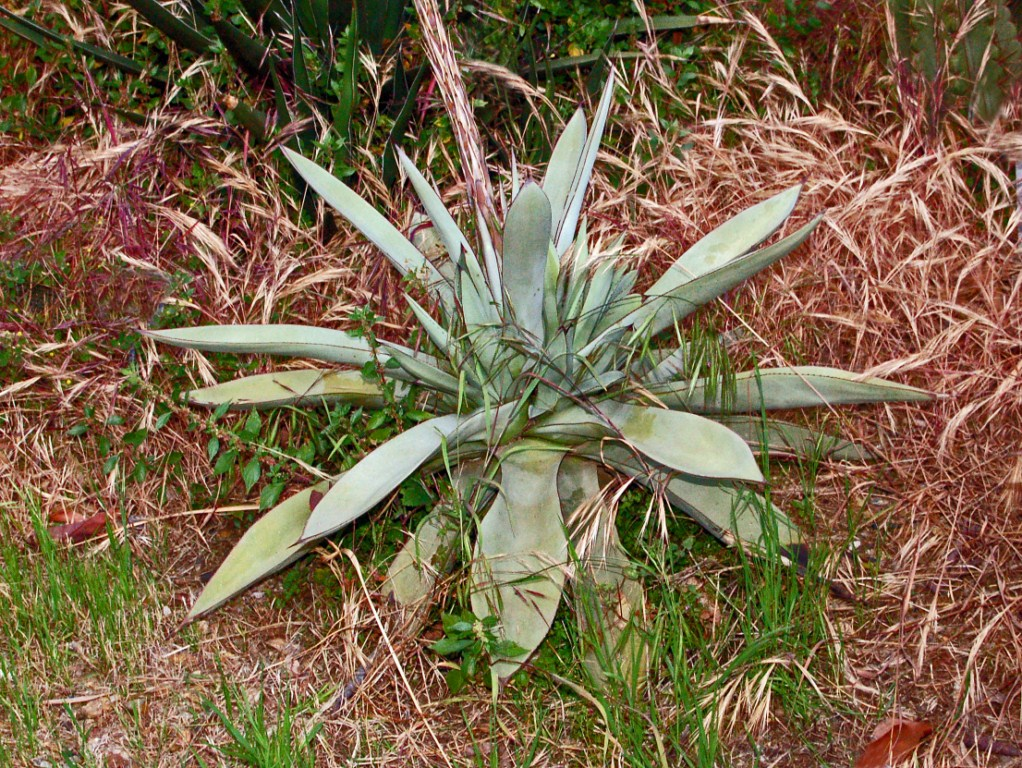
A. guiengola

- Agave galvaniae (A.Castañeda – Mexico (México State)
- Agave garciae-mendozae Galván & L.Hern. - Hidalgo
- Agave geminiflora (Tagl.) Ker Gawl. - Nayarit
- Agave gentryi B.Ullrich - Nuevo León, Querétaro
- Agave ghiesbreghtii Lem. ex Jacobi - Mexico, Guatemala
- Agave gigantensis Gentry - Sierra de la Giganta in Baja California Sur
- Agave gilbertii A.Berger - Mexico
- Agave × glomeruliflora (Engelm.) A.Berger = A. havardiana × A. lechuguilla - Coahuila, western Texas
- Agave gomezpompae Cházaro & Jimeno-Sevilla - Veracruz
- Agave gracielae Galvan & Zamudio – Mexico (Querétaro)
- Agave gracilipes Trel. – Maguey de pastizal, Slimfoot Century Plant - Chihuahua, southern New Mexico, western Texas
- Agave gracillima A.Berger – Mexico (Durango, Jalisco, Nayarit)
- Agave graminifolia (Rose) Govaerts & Thiede – NE. Mexico (to Jalisco)
- Agave grisea Trel. - Cuba
- Agave guadalajarana Trel. – Maguey chato - Jalisco, Nayarit
- Agave guerrerensis (Matuda) G.D.Rowley – Mexico (Guerrero)
- Agave guiengola Gentry - Oaxaca
- Agave guttata Jacobi & C.D.Bouché – NE. Mexico (to Jalisco)
- Agave gypsophila Gentry - Colima, Guerrero, Jalisco

== H ==
- Agave harrisii Trel. - Jamaica
- Agave hauniensis J.B.Petersen – C. Mexico (to Guerrero)
- Agave havardiana Trel. – Havard's Century Plant, Chisos Agave, Maguey de Havard - Chihuahua, Coahuila, Texas
- Agave hiemiflora Gentry - Chiapas, Guatemala
- Agave hookeri Jacobi - Jalisco, Michoacán
- Agave horrida Lem. ex Jacobi - Morelos, Veracruz, Oaxaca
- Agave howardii (Verh.-Will.) Thiede & Eggli – Mexico (Jalisco, Colima)
- Agave hurteri Trel. - Guatemala

== I–J ==
- Agave impressa Gentry - Sinaloa
- Agave inaequidens K.Koch - Mexico
- Agave inaguensis Trel. - Bahamas (Inagua), Turks and Caicos Islands
- Agave indagatorum Trel. - Bahamas (Watling Island)
- Agave intermixta Trel. - Hispaniola
- Agave involuta (McVaugh) Thiede & Eggli – Mexico (S. Zacatecas, SE. Nayarit, Jalisco)
- Agave isthmensis A.García-Mend. & F.Palma - Oaxaca, Chiapas
- Agave jaiboli Gentry - Sonora, Chihuahua
- Agave jaliscana (Rose) A.Berger – W. Mexico (to Durango)
- Agave jarucoensis A.Álvarez - Cuba
- Agave jimenoi Cházaro & A.Vázquez – Mexico (Veracruz)
- Agave justosierrana (García-Mend.) Thiede – Mexico (Guerrero)

== K–L ==
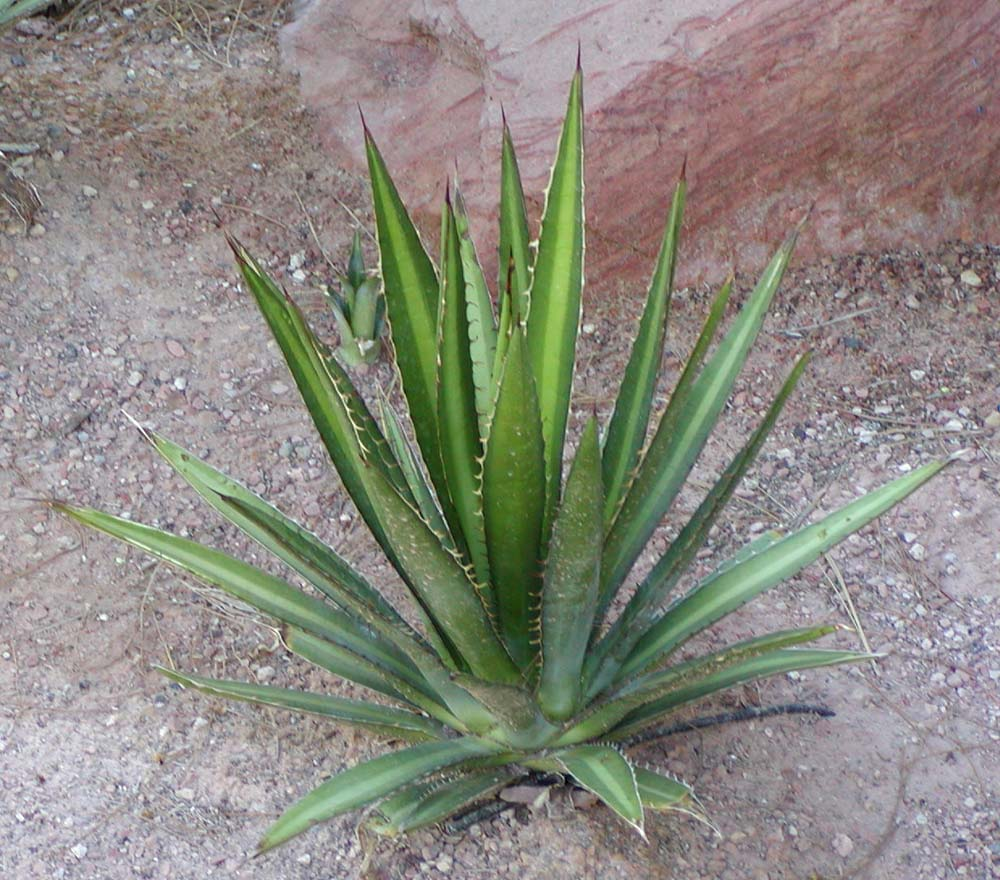
A. lechuguilla

- Agave karatto Mill. - Lesser Antilles, Netherlands Antilles
- Agave karwinskii Zucc. - Oaxaca, Puebla
- Agave kavandivi García-Mend. & C.Chávez – Mexico (Oaxaca)
- Agave kerchovei Lem. - Hidalgo, Oaxaca, Puebla
- Agave kewensis Jacobi - Chiapas
- Agave kristenii A.Vázquez & Cházaro – Mexico (Michoacán)
- Agave lagunae Trel. - Guatemala (Amatitlan)
- Agave lechuguilla Torr. – Agave lecheguilla, Lecheguilla, Lechuguilla, Maguey lechuguilla - northern Mexico, New Mexico, Texas
- Agave × leopoldii W.Watson – AGM
- Agave littoralis (García-Mend. – Mexico (Guerrero, Oaxaca)
- Agave longibracteata (Verh.-Will.) Thiede & Eggli – Mexico (Michoacán)
- Agave longiflora (Rose) G.D.Rowley – S. Texas to Mexico (Tamaulipas, Nuebo León)
- Agave longipes Trel. - Jamaica

== M ==
- Agave macroacantha Zucc. - Puebla, Oaxaca
- Agave maculata Regel – S. Texas to NE. Mexico
- Agave madrensis Villarreal – Mexico (Nuevo León)
- Agave manantlanicola Cuevas & Santana-Michel - Jalisco
- Agave mapisaga Trel. - Mexico
- Agave margaritae Brandegee - Baja California Sur
- Agave maria-patriciae Cházaro & Arzaba – Mexico (Veracruz)
- Agave marmorata Roezl - Puebla, Oaxaca
- Agave maximiliana Baker - Mexico
- Agave mckelveyana Gentry – Mckelvey Agave, McKelvey's Century Plant - Arizona (Yavapai + Mohave Cos)
- Agave melanacantha Lem. ex Jacobi – C. Cuba
- Agave michoacana (M.Cedano – Mexico (Michoacán)
- Agave microceps (Kimnach) A.Vázquez & Cházaro - Sinaloa
- Agave millspaughii Trel. - Bahamas (Exuma)

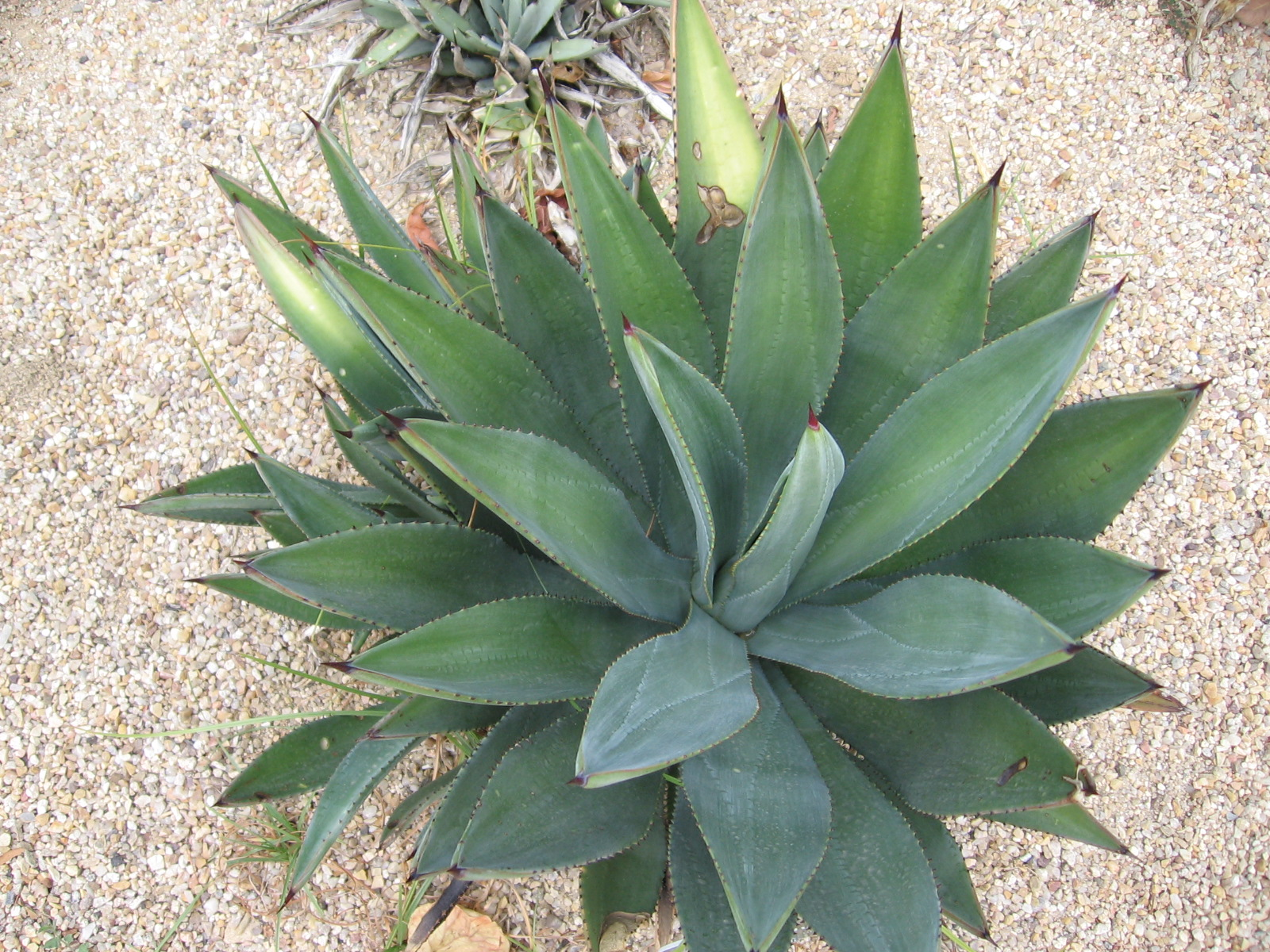
A. murpheyi

- Agave minor Proctor - Puerto Rico
- Agave missionum Trel. – Corita - Puerto Rico, U.S. Virgin Islands
- Agave mitis Mart. - Hidalgo
- Agave montana Villarreal - Nuevo León
- Agave montium-sancticaroli García-Mend. - Tamaulipas
- Agave moranii Gentry - Baja California
- Agave multicolor (E.Solano & Dávila) Thiede – Mexico (Guanajuato)
- Agave multifilifera Gentry - Chihuahua, Durango, Sinaloa
- Agave murpheyi Gibson – Maguey Bandeado, Murphey Agave, Murphey's Century Plant, Hohokam Agave - Arizona, Sonora

== N ==
- Agave nanchititlensis (Matuda) ined. – Mexico (México State)
- Agave nashii Trel. - Bahamas (Inagua)
- Agave nayaritensis Gentry - Sinaloa, Nayarit
- Agave neglecta Small – wild century plant = Agave weberi
- Agave neocernua Thiede - Jalisco
- Agave neonelsonii Thiede & Eggli – Mexico (Durango)
- Agave neopringlei Thiede & Eggli – Mexico
- Agave nickelsiae Rol.-Goss. - Coahuila
- Agave nizandensis Cutak – Dwarf Octopus Agave - Oaxaca
- Agave nuusaviorum García-Mend. - Oaxaca

== O ==
- Agave oaxacana (García-Mend. & E.Solano) Thiede – Mexico (Oaxaca)
- Agave obscura Schiede ex Schltdl. - Mexico
- Agave ocahui Gentry - Sonora
- Agave offoyana De Smet ex Jacobi – Cuba (Villa Clara)
- Agave ornithobroma Gentry – Maguey pajarito - Nayarit, Sinaloa
- Agave oroensis Gentry - Zacatecas
- Agave ortgiesiana (Baker) Trel. in L.H.Bailey - Colima, Jalisco
- Agave oteroi G.D. Starr & T.J. Davis - Oaxaca
- Agave ovatifolia G.D.Starr & Villarreal - Nuevo León

== P–Q ==
- Agave pablocarrilloi A.Vázquez – Mexico (Colima)
- Agave pachycentra Trel. - Chiapas, Guatemala, El Salvador, Honduras
- Agave palmeri Engelm. – Maguey de tlalcoyote, Palmer Agave, Palmer Century Plant, Palmer's Century Plant - Sonora, Chihuahua, Arizona, New Mexico
- Agave palustris (Rose) Thiede & Eggli – Mexico (Durango, Nayarit)
- Agave panamana Trel. – Panama

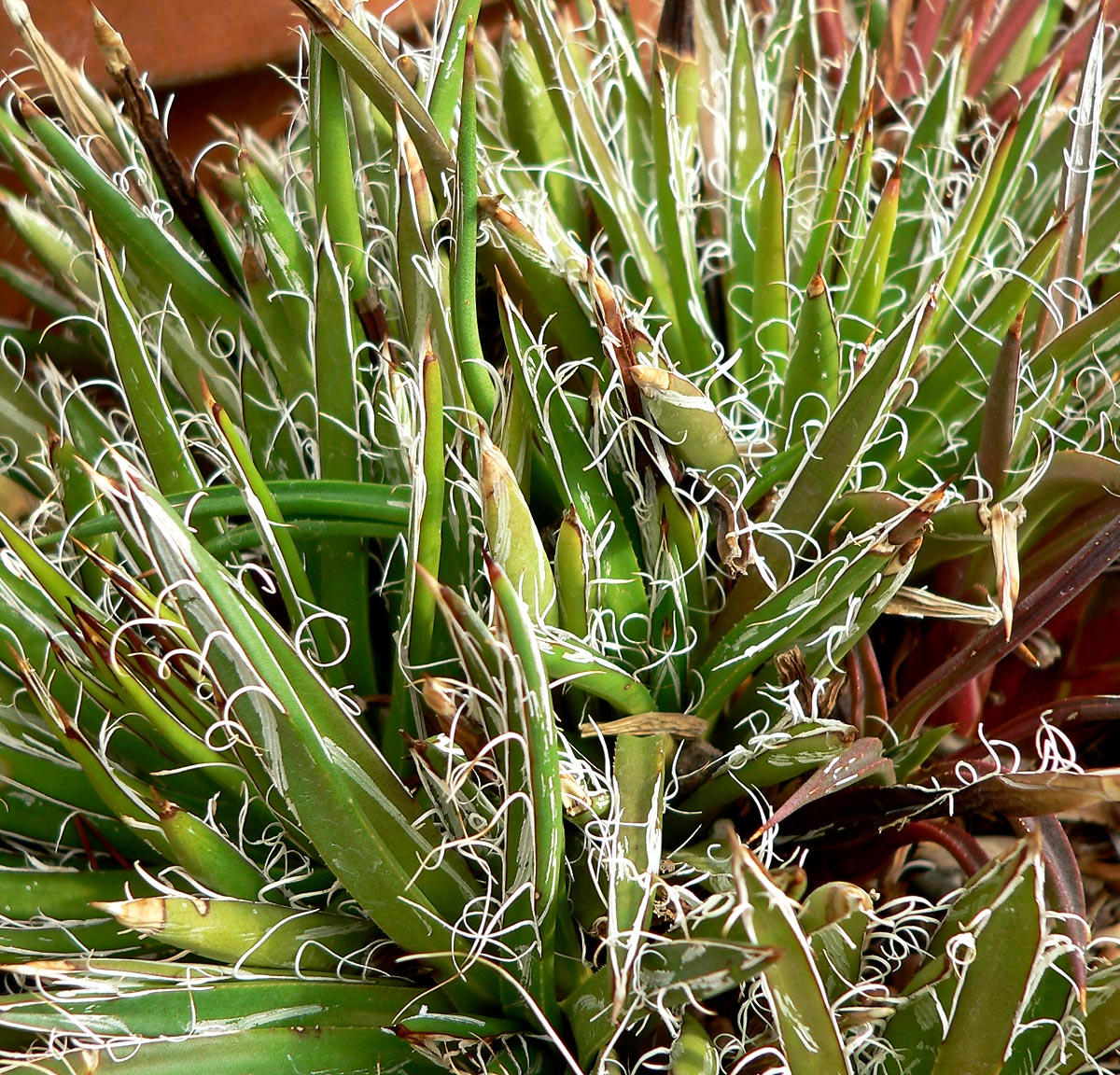
A. parviflora

- Agave paniculata (L.Hern. – Mexico (Yucatán)
- Agave papyrocarpa Trel. - Cuba (Isla de la Juventud)
- Agave parrasana A.Berger - Coahuila
- Agave parryi Engelm. – Mezcal yapavai, Parry Agave, Parry's Agave - Chihuahua, Durango, Guanajuato, Arizona, New Mexico, Texas
- Agave parva (Aarón Rodr.) Thiede – Mexico (Guerrero)
- Agave parvidentata Trel. - El Salvador, Honduras
- Agave parviflora Torr. in W.H.Emory – Maguey sbari, Smallflower Agave, Smallflower Century Plant, Little Princess Agave - Arizona, Sonora, Chihuahua
- Agave pax Gir.-Cañas - Colombia
- Agave peacockii Croucher - Puebla, Oaxaca
- Agave pelona Gentry – Bald Agave - Sonora
- Agave pendula Schnittsp. - Chiapas, Veracruz, Guatemala
- Agave petiolata Trel. - Curaçao
- Agave petrophila A.García-Mend. & E.Martínez - Puebla, Oaxaca, Guerrero
- Agave petskinil (R.A.Orellana – Mexico (Yucatán)
- Agave phillipsiana W.C.Hodgs. - Arizona (Coconino Co)
- Agave pintilla S.González - Durango
- Agave planifolia S.Watson – Mexico (Sonora, Chihuahua)
- Agave platyphylla (Rose) Thiede & Eggli – Mexico (Durango, Zacatecas, Jalisco)
- Agave polianthes Thiede & Eggli – C. & S. Mexico
- Agave polianthiflora Gentry - Chihuahua, Sonora
- Agave polyacantha Haw. - Oaxaca, San Luis Potosí, Tamaulipas, Veracruz
- Agave potatorum Zucc. – Drunkard Agave - Puebla, Oaxaca
- Agave potosina B.L.Rob. & Greenm. – NE. Mexico
- Agave potreriana Trel. - Mexico
- Agave pratensis A.Berger – Mexico (Jalisco, Nayarit)
- Agave pringlei Engelm. ex Baker – Mexico (N. Baja California)
- Agave producta Thiede & Eggli – Mexico (Guerrero)
- Agave promontorii Trel. - Baja California Sur
- Agave pubescens Regel & Ortgies – Mexico (Morelos, Oaxaca, Chiapas)
- Agave × pumila De Smet ex Baker = A. asperrima × A. nickelsiae - Coahuila
- Agave quilae (Art.Castro & Aarón Rodr.) Thiede & Govaerts - Mexico (Jalisco)

== R ==
- Agave revoluta Klotzsch – Mexico (México State)
- Agave rhodacantha Trel. - Mexico
- Agave rosei Thiede & Eggli – Mexico (Nayarit)
- Agave rovelliana Tod. - Texas
- Agave rutteniae Hummelinck - Aruba
- Agave rzedowskiana P.Carrillo - Sinaloa, Jalisco

== S ==
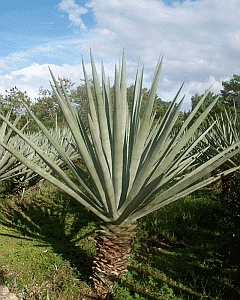
A. sisalana

- Agave salmiana Otto ex Salm-Dyck – Pulque, Maguey, Maguey de montaña - Mexico; naturalized in South Africa, Canary Islands, Portugal
- Agave sanpedroensis W.C.Hodgs. & Salywon – Arizona
- Agave scabra Ortega – Mexico to Nicaragua
- Agave scaposa Gentry - Oaxaca, Puebla
- Agave schidigera Lem. - northern + central Mexico
- Agave schneideriana A.Berger - Puebla
- Agave schottii Engelm. – Maguey puercoesp n, Schott Agave, Schott's Century Plant, Shindagger, Leather Agave - Sonora, Arizona, New Mexico
- Agave sebastiana Greene - Baja California
- Agave seemanniana Jacobi - Oaxaca, Chiapas, Costa Rica, Nicaragua, Guatemala, Honduras
- Agave shaferi Trel. - Cuba
- Agave shawii Engelm. – Coastal Agave, Maguey primavera - Baja California, California (San Diego Co)
- Agave shrevei Gentry - Chihuahua, Sonora
- Agave sileri (Verh.-Will.) Thiede & Eggli – SC. Texas to Mexico (Tamaulipas)
- Agave singuliflora (S.Watson) A.Berger – N. Mexico
- Agave sisalana Perrine – Maguey de Sisal, Sisal, Sisal Hemp - Chiapas; widely cultivated for fiber; naturalized in Spain, Ecuador, Brazil, Queensland, Central America, parts of Asia + Africa, various islands
- Agave sobolifera Houtt. - Cuba, Jamaica
- Agave sobria Brandegee - Baja California Sur
- Agave spicata Cav. - Hidalgo
- Agave stictata Thiede & Eggli – Mexico (México State, Guerrero, Oaxaca)
- Agave striata Zucc. - northeastern Mexico
- Agave stricta Salm-Dyck - Oaxaca, Puebla
- Agave stringens Trel. - Jalisco
- Agave subsimplex Trel. - Sonora

== T ==
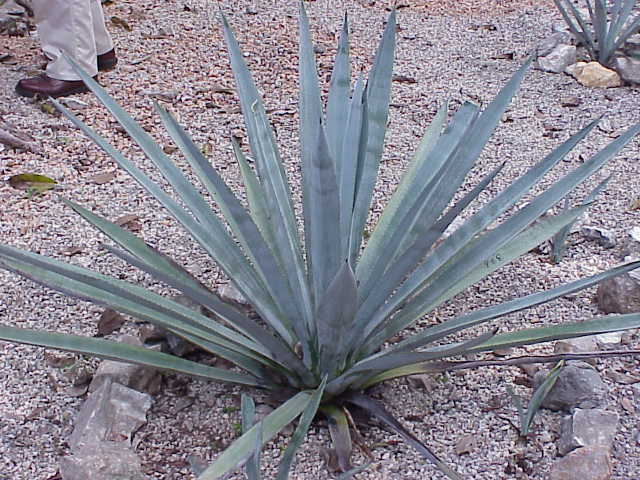
A. tequilana

- Agave tecta Trel. - Guatemala
- Agave temacapulinensis A.Vázquez & Cházaro – Mexico (Jalisco)
- Agave tenuifolia Zamudio & E.Sánchez - Querétaro
- Agave tequilana F.A.C.Weber – Mezcal azul tequilero, Tequila Agave, Weber Blue Agave - Mexico
- Agave thomasiae Trel. - Guatemala
- Agave titanota Gentry - Puebla, Oaxaca
- Agave toumeyana Trel. – Toumey Agave, Toumey's Century Plant - Arizona
- Agave triangularis Jacobi - Puebla, Oaxaca
- Agave tubulata Trel. - Cuba
- Agave turneri R.H.Webb & Salazar-Ceseña - Baja California

== U–V ==
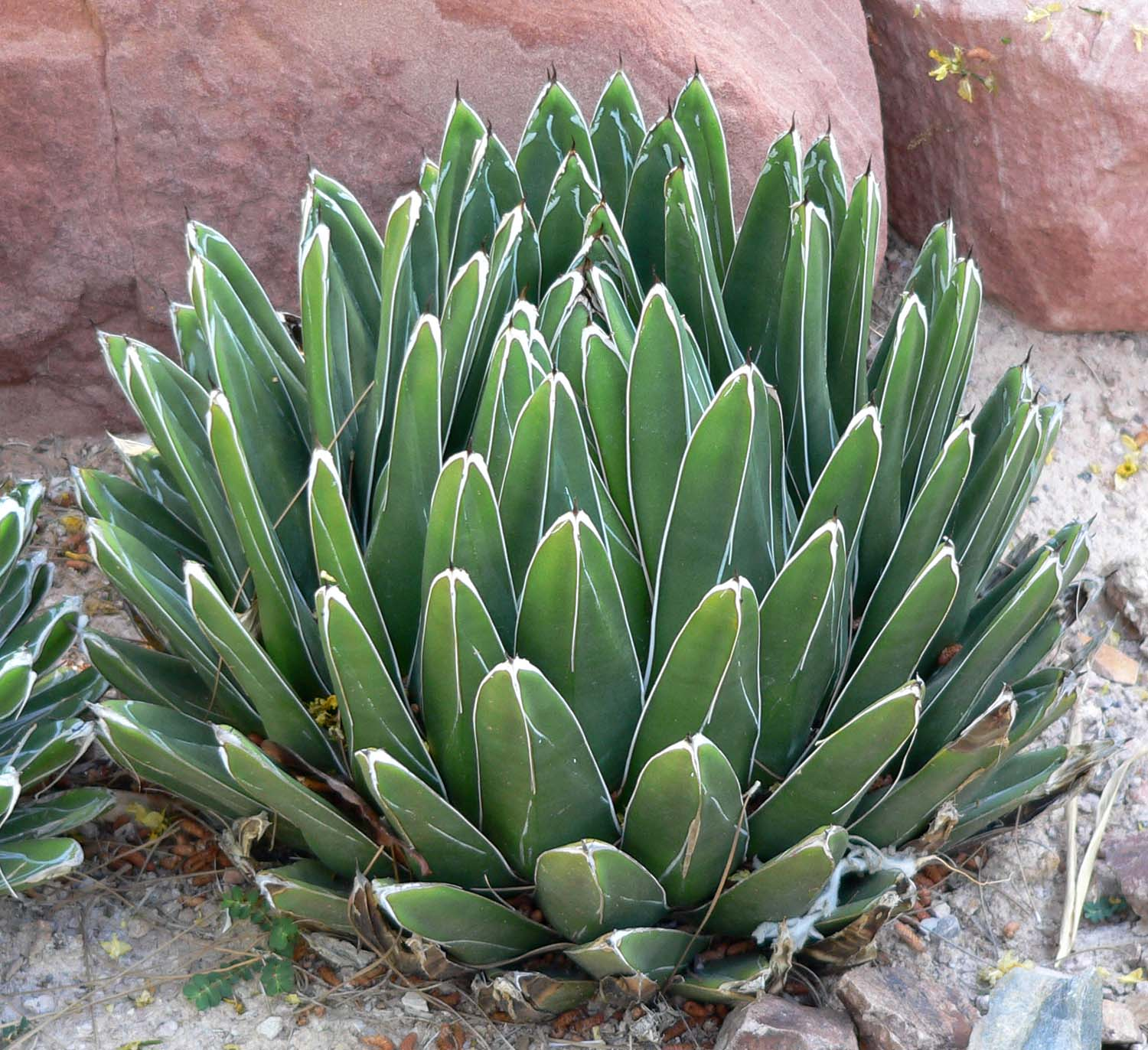
A. victoriae-reginae

- Agave umbrophila (García-Mend.) Thiede – Mexico (Guerrero, Oaxaca)
- Agave underwoodii Trel. - Cuba
- Agave undulata Klotzsch – Mexico (Tamaulipas)
- Agave univittata Haw. - Mexico, Texas
- Agave utahensis Engelm. in S.Watson – Utah Agave - Utah, Nevada, California, Arizona
- Agave valenciana Cházaro & A.Vázquez - Jalisco
- Agave variegata Jacobi – S. Texas to Mexico
- Agave vazquezgarciae Cházaro & J.A.Lomelí - Jalisco
- Agave vera-cruz Mill. - Veracruz, Oaxaca; naturalized in Indian Subcontinent, Thailand, various islands
- Agave verdensis W.C.Hodgs. & Salywon – Arizona
- Agave verhoekiae (García-Mend.) Thiede – Mexico (Oaxaca)
- Agave vicina Trel. - Netherlands Antilles, Venezuelan Antilles
- Agave victoriae-reginae T.Moore – Queen Victoria's Agave - Coahuila, Nuevo Leon, Durango
- Agave vilmoriniana A.Berger – Octopus Agave - Mexico
- Agave virginica L. – C. & E. U.S.A. to NE. Mexico
- Agave vivipara L. - Netherlands Antilles, Venezuelan Antilles; naturalized in parts of Australia + Africa
- Agave vizcainoensis Gentry - Baja California Sur

== W–Z ==
- Agave wallisii Jacobi - Colombia
- Agave warelliana Baker - Veracruz, Oaxaca, Chiapas
- Agave weberi J.F.Cels ex J.Poiss. – Maguey liso, Weber's Century Plant, Weber Agave - San Luis Potosí, Tamaulipas; naturalized in southern Texas
- Agave wendtii Cházaro - SE Veracruz
- Agave wercklei F.A.C.Weber ex Wercklé - Costa Rica; naturalized in parts of Africa
- Agave wildingii Tod. - Cuba
- Agave wocomahi Gentry - Sonora, Chihuahua, Durango, Sinaloa, Jalisco
- Agave xylonacantha Salm-Dyck – Century Plant, Maguey diente de tiburn - Hidalgo, San Luis Potosi
- Agave yavapaiensis W.C.Hodgs. & Salywon – Arizona
- Agave zapopanensis (E.Solano & Ríos-Gómez) Thiede – Mexico (Jalisco)
- Agave zebra Gentry - Sonora

== Formerly included ==
Manfreda and Polianthes species are now included in Agave.

- Agave argyrophylla, syn. of Furcraea parmentieri
- Agave aspera, syn. of Furcraea hexapetala
- Agave australis, syn. of Furcraea hexapetala
- Agave bulbosa, syn. of Furcraea foetida
- Agave campanulata, syn. of Furcraea tuberosa
- Agave commelyni, syn. of Furcraea foetida
- Agave cubensis, syn. of Furcraea hexapetala
- Agave foetida, syn. of Furcraea foetida
- Agave funifera, syn. of Hesperaloe funifera
- Agave gigantea, syn. of Furcraea foetida
- Agave hexapetala, syn. of Furcraea hexapetala
- Agave madagascariensis, syn. of Furcraea foetida
- Agave odorata, syn. of Furcraea hexapetala
- Agave spinosa, syn. of Furcraea tuberosa
- Agave toneliana, syn. of Furcraea parmentieri
- Agave tuberosa Mill. 1768 not (L.) Thiede & Eggli 1999, syn. of Furcraea tuberosa
