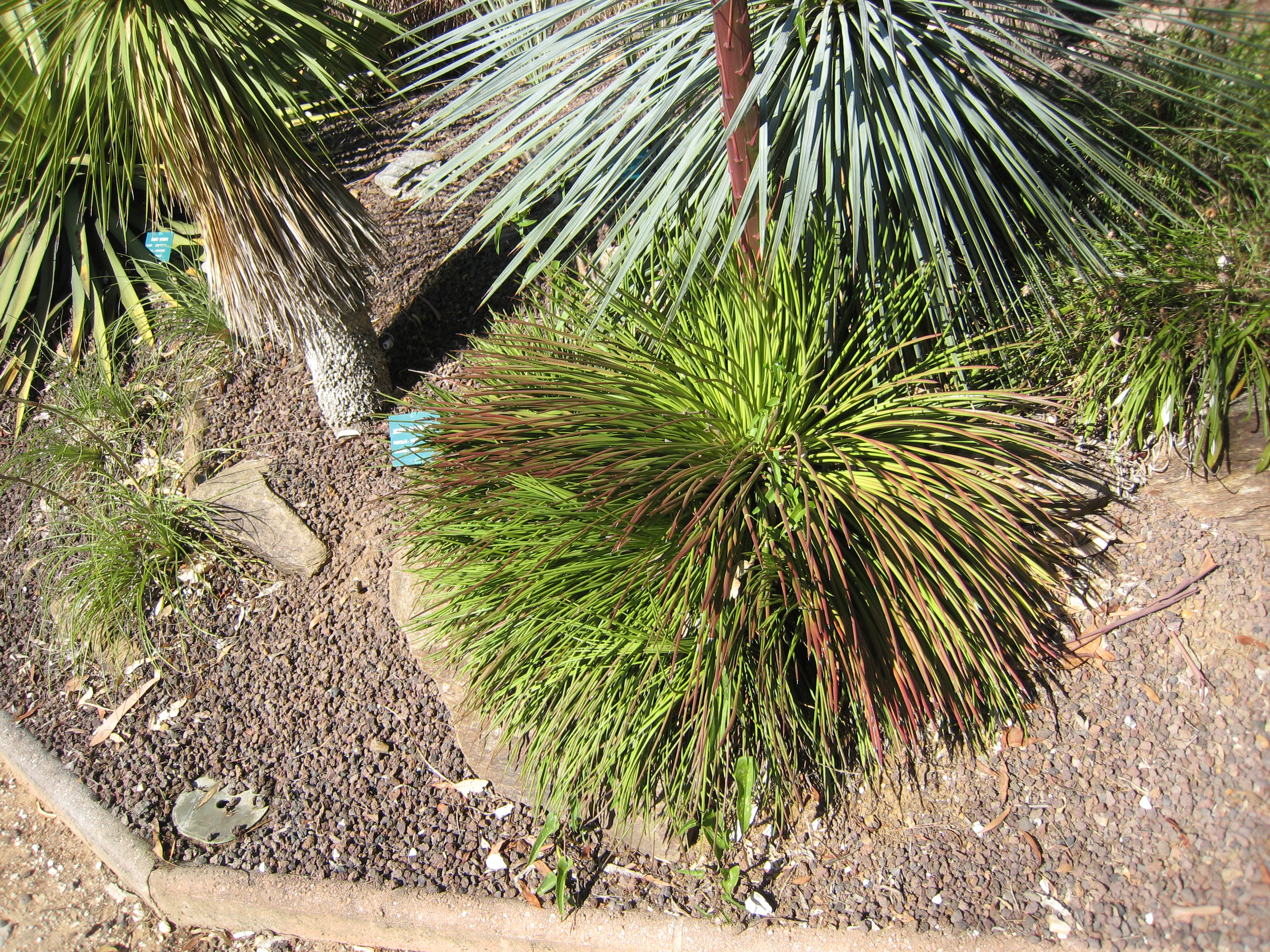
- In cultivation

Conservation status
- Vulnerable (IUCN 3.1)

Scientific classification
- Kingdom: Plantae
- Clade: Tracheophytes
- Clade: Angiosperms
- Clade: Monocots
- Order: Asparagales
- Family: Asparagaceae
- Subfamily: Agavoideae
- Genus: Agave
- Species: A. geminiflora

Binomial name
- Agave geminiflora (Tagl.) Ker Gawl.

Synonyms
- Littaea geminiflora Tagl.; Bonapartea juncea Haw., sensu auct.; Yucca boscii Hornem., nom. rej. prop.; Dracaena boscii (Hornem.) Zeyh.; Dracaena filamentosa Scan. ex Schult. & Schult.f. in J.J.Roemer & J.A.Schultes, pro syn.; Tillandsia juncea Willd. ex Steud., nom. inval.; Agave geminiflora var. filamentosa Hook.; Littaea juncea E.Morren.; Agave angustissima Engelm.; Agave geminiflora var. filifera A.Terracc.; Agave boscii (Hornem.) ined.

= Agave geminiflora =

Twin Flowered Agave

Species of flowering plant

Agave geminiflora is a species of Agave endemic to the Mexican States of Nayarit and Jalisco. The common name is twin flowered agave.

Agave geminiflora can have 100-200 leaves which are linear, moderately flexible, dark green, and have convex edges with white horny lines and curled threads. The flowers are 5 or 6 centimeters long on a tall inflorescence.
