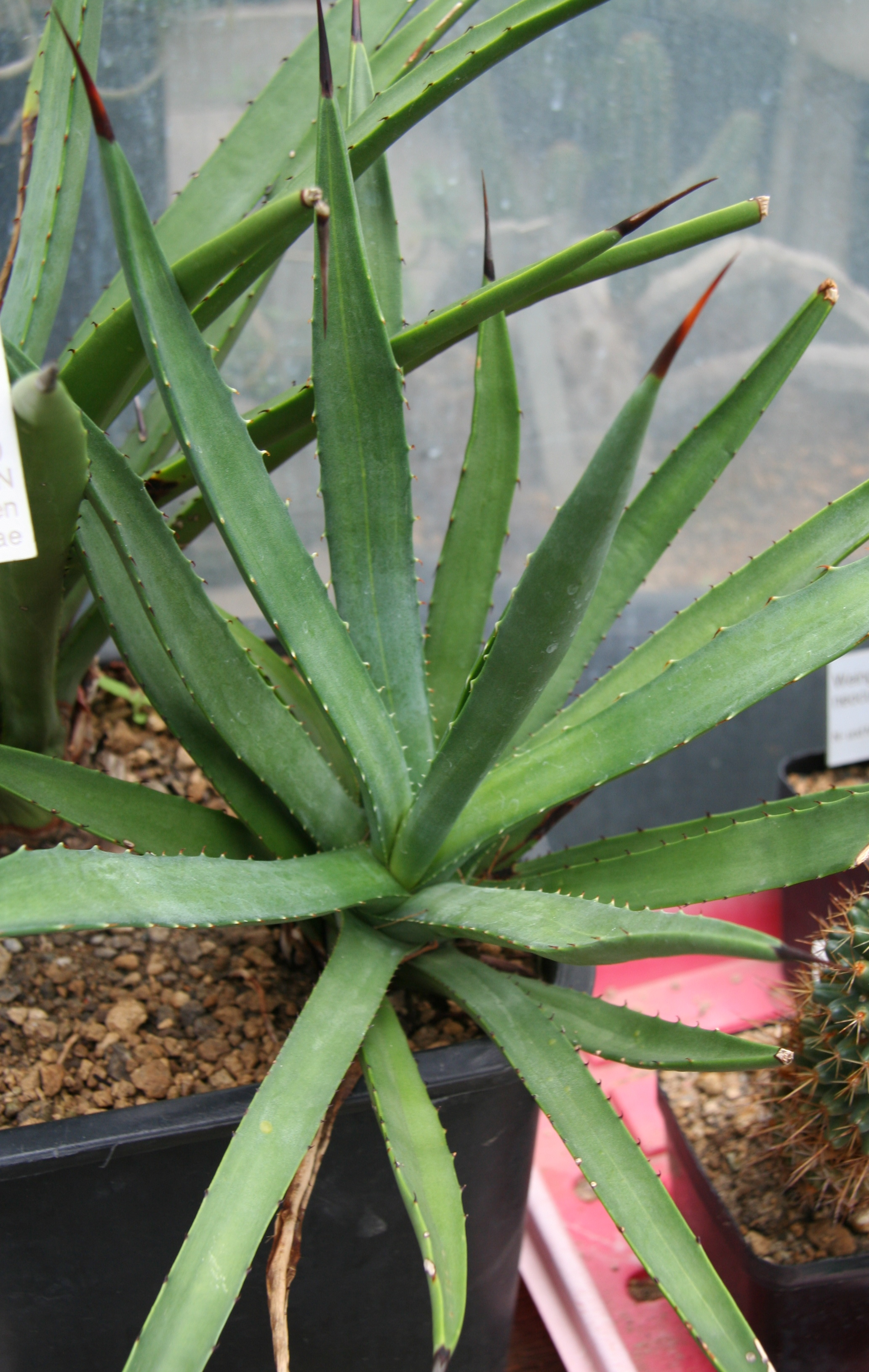

Conservation status
- Least Concern (IUCN 3.1)

Scientific classification
- Kingdom: Plantae
- Clade: Tracheophytes
- Clade: Angiosperms
- Clade: Monocots
- Order: Asparagales
- Family: Asparagaceae
- Subfamily: Agavoideae
- Genus: Agave
- Species: A. datylio

Binomial name
- Agave datylio Simon ex F.A.C.Weber

= Agave datylio =

Species of flowering plant

Agave datylio is a member of the Agavoideae subfamily and a succulent plant. It is native to Baja California Sur.

== Description ==
Agave datylio grows in a leaf rosette of about 3.3 feet (1.0 m) diameter. It has narrow, lanceolate leaves up to 2–2.6 ft (0.61–0.79 m) long, are grooved on top and with 1.6-inch (41 mm) spines at the tip, with 0.1–0.2-inch (2.5–5.1 mm) teeth spaced along the edges. The leaves are initially green when young, becoming yellow to a golden brown with age. The 1.6–2.2-inch (41–56 mm) flowers are greenish yellow, up to 55 mm (2.2 inches) long.

== Cultivation ==
Easy to garden, A. datylio prefers gentle slopes and open sunlight and propagates vegetatively, but can be propagated by seed.
