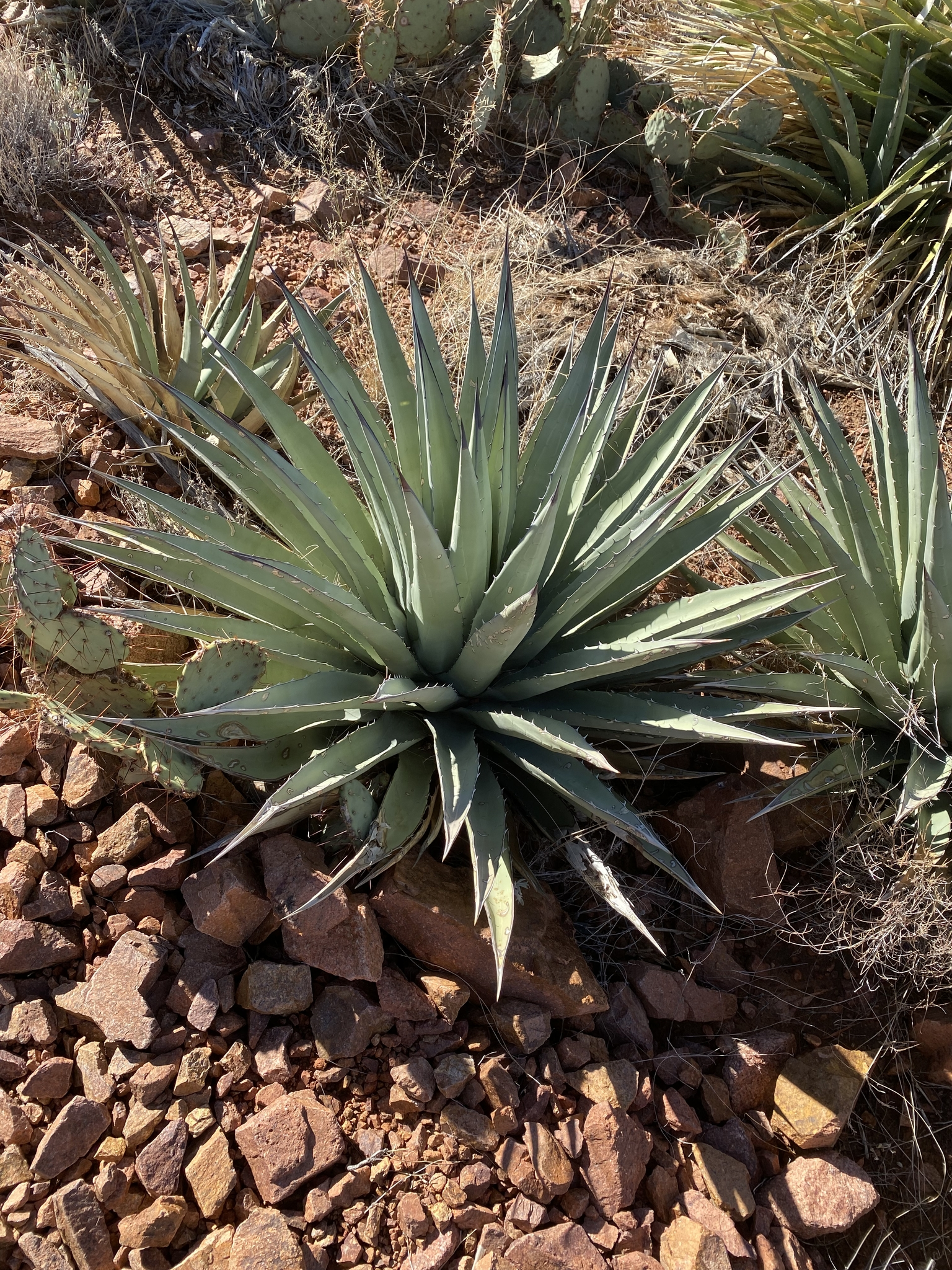
- In Franklin Mountains State Park, Texas

Conservation status
- Apparently Secure (NatureServe)

Scientific classification
- Kingdom: Plantae
- Clade: Tracheophytes
- Clade: Angiosperms
- Clade: Monocots
- Order: Asparagales
- Family: Asparagaceae
- Subfamily: Agavoideae
- Genus: Agave
- Species: A. gracilipes

Binomial name
- Agave gracilipes Trel.

= Agave gracilipes =

Species of flowering plant

Agave gracilipes, common names Maguey de pastizal or slimfoot century plant, is a plant species native to western Texas, southern New Mexico and Chihuahua. It is found in grasslands, desert scrub and open pinyon-juniper woodlands at elevations of 1,200 to 1,900 m (3,900 to 6,200 ft).

Agave gracilipes is not as large as some other species in the genus. Leaves are up to 30 cm (12 in) long, 7 cm (2.8 in) across. Flowering stalks can be as high as 5 m (16 ft) tall, with yellowish flowers.
