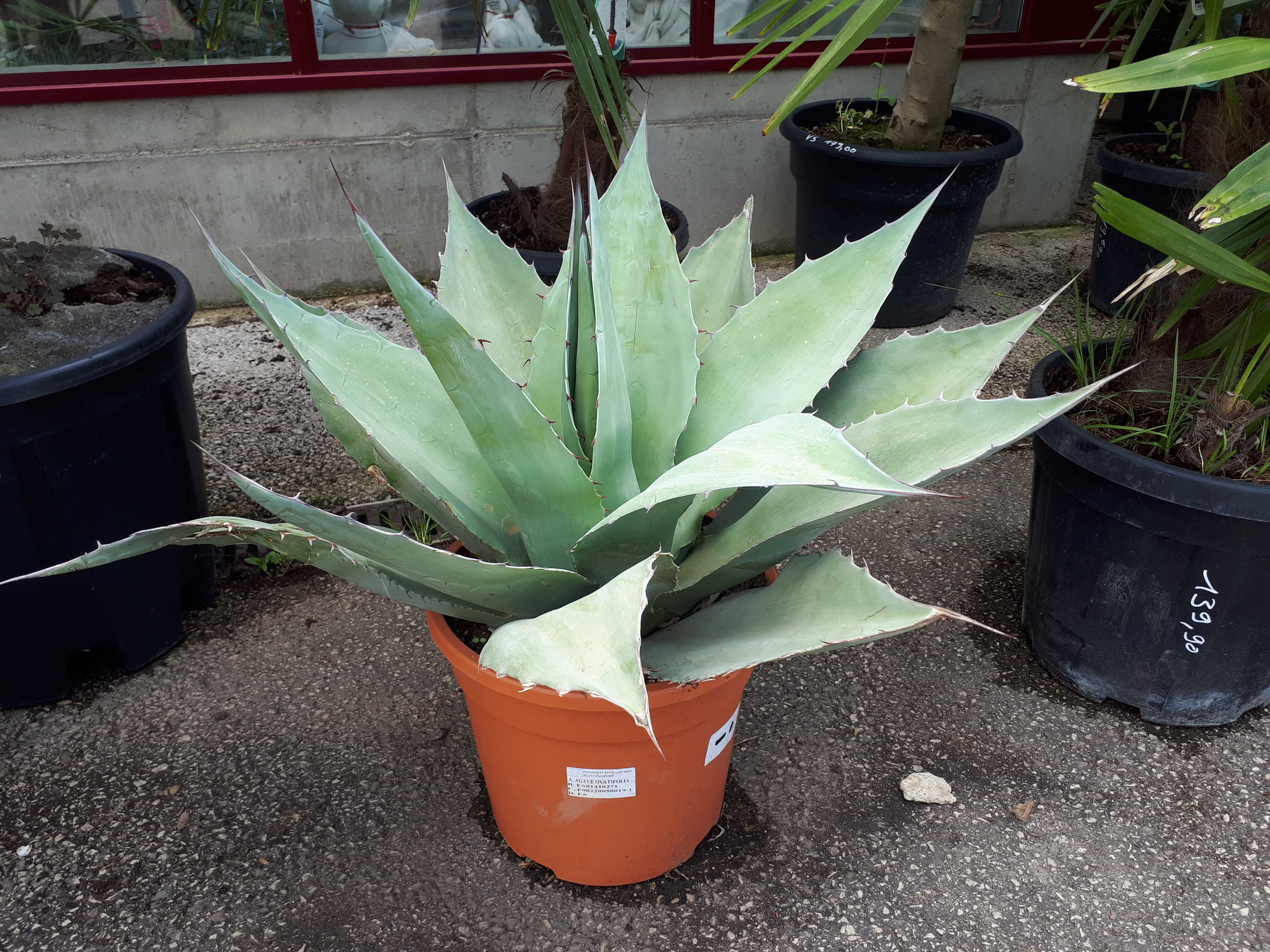

Conservation status
- Least Concern (IUCN 3.1)

Scientific classification
- Kingdom: Plantae
- Clade: Embryophytes
- Clade: Tracheophytes
- Clade: Angiosperms
- Clade: Monocots
- Order: Asparagales
- Family: Asparagaceae
- Subfamily: Agavoideae
- Genus: Agave
- Species: A. ovatifolia

Binomial name
- Agave ovatifolia G.D.Starr & Villarreal

= Agave ovatifolia =

Species of plant

Agave ovatifolia, the whale's tongue agave, is a species of flowering plant in the family Asparagaceae. It is native to the Nuevo Leon region of the Chihuahuan Desert in northern Mexico.

== Description ==
Agave ovatifolia grows solitarily with a growth height of 60 to 90 cm and is 80 to 120 cm wide. The bluish to grey, rigid, strong, wide elliptical to oval-shaped leaves are 35 to 4 cm long, 20 to 24 cm wide. The leaf edges are irregularly toothed. The dark grey to black variable tip to jad-dirthorn is 2 to 3 cm long.

The cracked, straight to somewhat curved inflorescence becomes 3.5 to 4 m high. The green to yellow, numerous flowers appear in the middle to the upper half of the inflorescence at the end of the loosely arranged, variable branches and are 65 to 75 mm long. The flower tube is 15 to 20 mm long.

The elongated three-chamber capsule fruits are 50 to 60 mm long and 15 to 20 mm wide. The shiny, black moon-shaped seeds are 5 to 6 mm long and 3 to 4 mm wide.

== Systematics and distribution ==
Agave ovatifolia grows endemic in Mexico in the states of Nuevo Leon in limestone soil, on stony, slopes, in forest and grassland at 1100 to 1300 m altitude. It is associated with Agave asperrima, Yucca rostrata, Dasylirion species, Ferocactus hamatacanthus and other cactus and succulent species.

The first description by Gregory Dirk Starr and José Angel Villarreal-Quintanilla was published in 2002.

Agave ovatifolia is a representative of the group Parryanae and grows endemic to the Sierra de Lampazos in North Nuevo Leon in Mexico. Plants were first found by nickel (1870) and known as "Agave Noah". William Trelease classified this invalidly described species as a synonym of Agave wislizenii in 1911. Characteristic are the compact, more open rosettes with the bluish to grey, variably arranged, stiff, strong, wide elliptical to oval-shaped leaves. The leaf edges are irregularly toothed. The dark grey to black pointed to jad-dirfung is 2 to 3 cm long.

Agave ovatifolia is closely related to Agave havardiana and Agave parasana, the other representatives of the Parryanae group, however, the differences in size, leaf and flower structure are visible.

Agave ovatifolia can survive short periods of frost up to just below 0°F when they are dry.
