= Agave chazaroi =

- Agave Chazaroi plant

Conservation status
- Vulnerable (IUCN 3.1)

Scientific classification
- Kingdom: Plantae
- Clade: Tracheophytes
- Clade: Angiosperms
- Clade: Monocots
- Order: Asparagales
- Family: Asparagaceae
- Subfamily: Agavoideae
- Genus: Agave
- Species: A. chazaroi

Binomial name
- Agave chazaroi A.Vázquez & O.M.Valencia

Species of plant

Agave chazaroi, commonly known as maguey de Miguel de Jesús Cházaro Basáñez, is a species of agave native to Jalisco, Mexico.

== Description ==
Agave chazaroi grows solitarily and forms runners with a height of up to 80 cm and a width of up to 145 cm. The dark green to yellow, broad, stiff, glossy, irregularly arranged leaves are up to 80 cm long and up to 20 cm wide. The reddish-brown leaf edges are irregularly finely toothed. The brown terminal spine is 3 to 5 cm long.

The spike-like, slender inflorescence grows up to 2.5 m tall. The numerous, white to cream-colored flowers growing in clusters appear between the leaves and are 20 to 30mm long.

The elongated capsule fruits are up to 20 mm long.

The flowering period lasts from March to April.

== Distribution ==
Agave chazaroi is widespread in Mexico, in the state of Jalisco, in tropical regions at elevations of 900m to 1200m. It is associated with Mammillaria scrippsiana, Stenocereus dumortieri, and various succulent species.

The first description by José Antonio Vázquez García and Oscar Manuel Valencia Pelayo was published in 2007.

Agave chazaroi is a representative of the Marginatae section. It grows in limited areas in Tequila, Jalisco, and the surrounding region. It is related to Agave pelona, however, differences in flower structure are noticeable.
