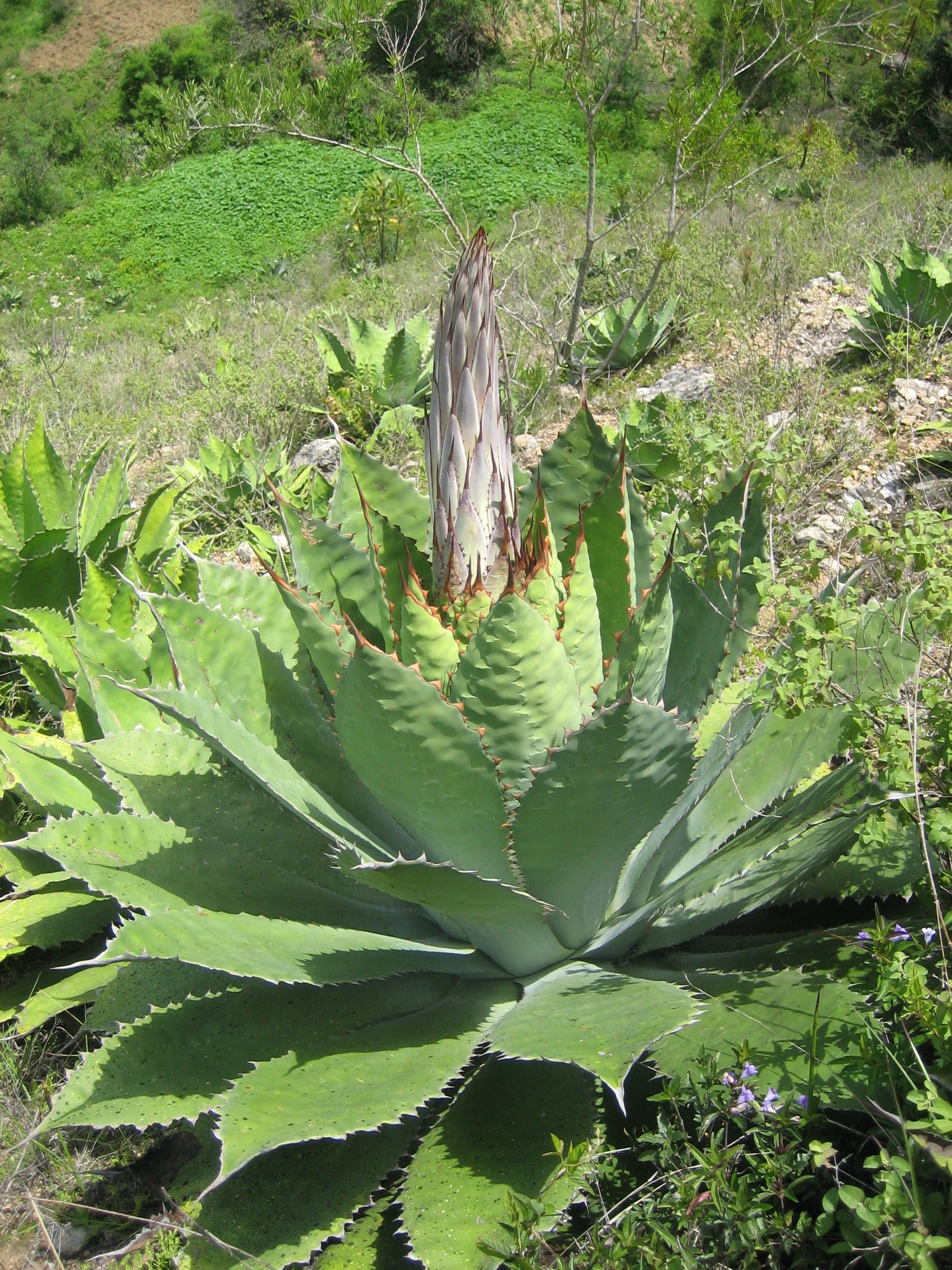

Conservation status
- Endangered (IUCN 3.1)

Scientific classification
- Kingdom: Plantae
- Clade: Embryophytes
- Clade: Tracheophytes
- Clade: Spermatophytes
- Clade: Angiosperms
- Clade: Monocots
- Order: Asparagales
- Family: Asparagaceae
- Subfamily: Agavoideae
- Genus: Agave
- Species: A. cupreata

Binomial name
- Agave cupreata Trel. & A.Berger

= Agave cupreata =

Species of flowering plant

Agave cupreata is a species of plant in the family Asparagaceae, and is found only on mountain slopes of the Rio Balsas basin in the Mexican states of Michoacán and Guerrero at elevations of 1,200–1,800 meters (3,900–5,900 ft). A. cupreata is a long-lived plant with mature leaves reaching between 40–80 cm (16–31 in) in length and a flowering stalk of 4–7 m (13–23 ft). The age of maturity for A. cupreata is variable, but generally occurs at any time from 5–15 years. A monocarpic perennial which does not reproduce clonally, A. cupreata allocates its accumulated resources toward the production of a single inflorescence and dies following the production of seeds.

Communities in the mountains of Guerrero harvest and make mezcal out of Agave cupreata, known locally as maguey papalote.
