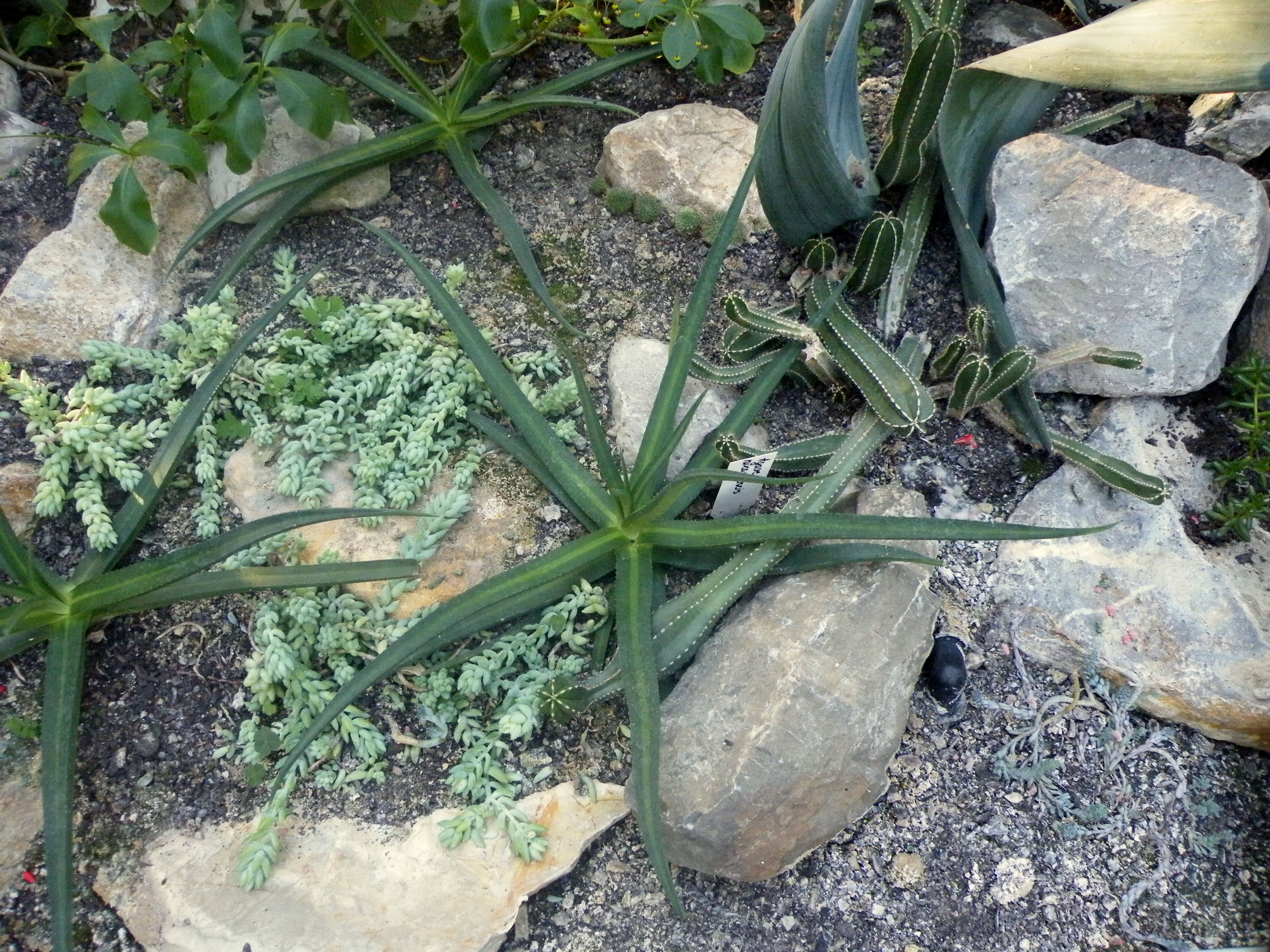
- Agave nizandensis (Botanical garden Jevremovac)

Conservation status
- Critically Endangered (IUCN 3.1)

Scientific classification
- Kingdom: Plantae
- Clade: Tracheophytes
- Clade: Angiosperms
- Clade: Monocots
- Order: Asparagales
- Family: Asparagaceae
- Subfamily: Agavoideae
- Genus: Agave
- Species: A. nizandensis

Binomial name
- Agave nizandensis Cutak

= Agave nizandensis =

Species of flowering plant

Agave nizandensis is a relatively small member of the genus Agave, in the family Asparagaceae. It is rare species endemic to a small region in the State of Oaxaca in southern Mexico.

== Description ==
Agave nizandensis produces a basal leaf rosette of up to 60 cm (2 foot) in diameter. Leaves are dark green with a pale stripe down the centre, and about 1 foot long and 1 inch wide, ending in blunt red spines at the tips. Edges are slightly jagged. Flowers are yellowish green and grow on a spike of 2–3.3 feet high.

== Cultivation ==
Agave nizandensis can be propagated vegetatively or by seed.
