= Agave anomala =

Scientific classification
- Kingdom: Plantae
- Clade: Tracheophytes
- Clade: Angiosperms
- Clade: Monocots
- Order: Asparagales
- Family: Asparagaceae
- Subfamily: Agavoideae
- Genus: Agave
- Species: A. anomala

Binomial name
- Agave anomala Trel.

Species of flowering plant

Agave anomala is a species of Agave in the family Asparagaceae. This species is found on Cuba and also on San Salvador Island in the Bahamas. Several other Agave including the ornamental species, A. americana (century plant) are present on San Salvador.

Agave anomala forms colonies of rosettes that spread vegetatively. Leaves are lanceolate, up to 100 cm (40 inches) long, either without prickles or with only a few prickles along the margins near the base. Flowering stalks can reach a height of up to 4 m (13 feet). Flowers are yellow, up to 7 cm (2.75 inches) long.

== See also ==
- Furcraea
- Agavoideae
