= Agave valenciana =

Conservation status
- Critically Endangered (IUCN 3.1)

Scientific classification
- Kingdom: Plantae
- Clade: Tracheophytes
- Clade: Angiosperms
- Clade: Monocots
- Order: Asparagales
- Family: Asparagaceae
- Subfamily: Agavoideae
- Genus: Agave
- Species: A. valenciana

Binomial name
- Agave valenciana Cházaro & A.Vázquez

Species of plant

Agave valenciana is a species of agave native to Jalisco, Mexico.
