= Agave phillipsiana =

Conservation status
- Imperiled (NatureServe)

Scientific classification
- Kingdom: Plantae
- Clade: Embryophytes
- Clade: Tracheophytes
- Clade: Angiosperms
- Clade: Monocots
- Order: Asparagales
- Family: Asparagaceae
- Subfamily: Agavoideae
- Genus: Agave
- Species: A. phillipsiana

Binomial name
- Agave phillipsiana W.C.Hodgson

Species of flowering plant

Agave phillipsiana is a rare species of flowering plant in the asparagus family known by the common names Grand Canyon century plant and Phillips agave. It is endemic to Arizona in the United States, where it lives only in Grand Canyon National Park. It is a perennial herb or shrub.

This plant forms one or more rosettes of large lance-shaped green to gray-green leaves with teeth along the edges and spines at the tips. The leaf blades grow up to 78 centimeters long by 11 wide. The flowering stalk grows up to 5.5 meters tall. The branching inflorescence has clusters of many flowers each 7 or 8 centimeters wide or more which are greenish and cream-colored with hints of maroon. Long stamens protrude from the flower corollas.

There are four occurrences of this plant, all within Grand Canyon National Park, where they grow on terraces next to rivers. Some occurrences are in locations inhabited by indigenous peoples long ago, who may have farmed the plant and selected it for its ease of propagation and harvest.

The plant's numbers are low but it grows in rugged terrain in a national park, which may protect it somewhat from human threats. It grows in sandy, gravelly, rocky soils in desert scrub, slopes, and hillsides.
