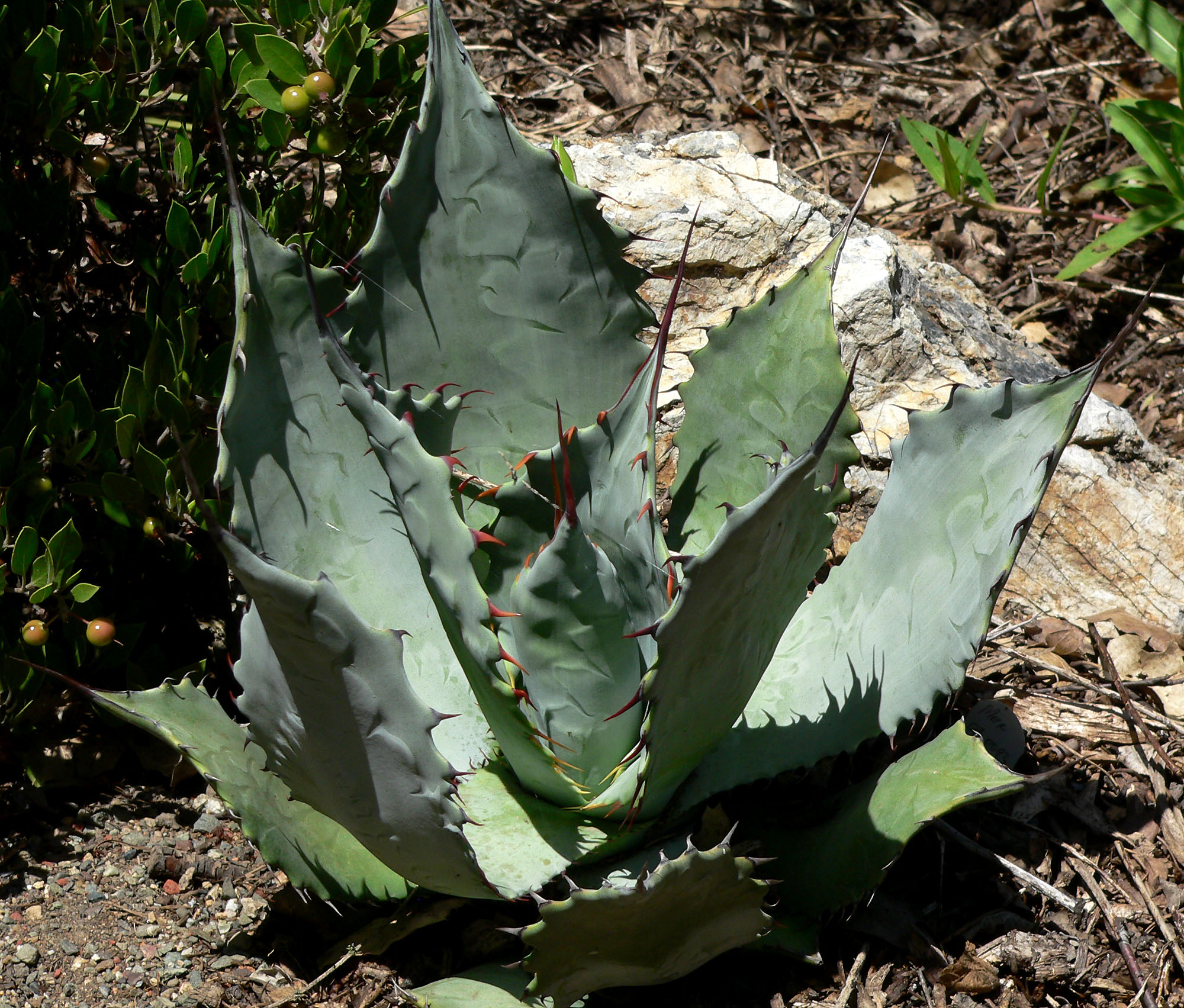
- Agave shrevei subsp. shrevei

Conservation status
- Least Concern (IUCN 3.1)

Scientific classification
- Kingdom: Plantae
- Clade: Tracheophytes
- Clade: Angiosperms
- Clade: Monocots
- Order: Asparagales
- Family: Asparagaceae
- Subfamily: Agavoideae
- Genus: Agave
- Species: A. shrevei

Binomial name
- Agave shrevei Gentry

Subspecies
- Agave shrevei subsp. matapensis Gentry; Agave shrevei subsp. magna Gentry

= Agave shrevei =

Species of flowering plant

Agave shrevei is a member of the family Asparagaceae, indigenous to the Sierra Madre Occidental in Mexico, along the boundary between the states of Chihuahua and Sonora. Two subspecies are currently recognized, although a third has been proposed (A. shrevei subsp. magna H.S. Gentry).

== Description ==
Agave shrevei subsp. matapensis grows as an open basal rosette of 0.7-0.8 inch long, 0.2-0.3 inch wide leaves bearing distinct compaction marks, fringed in small pale spines and tipped with particularly long apical needles with bases of up to 0.4 inches wide. Has small pale yellow flowers.

== Cultivation ==
Propagates mainly by seed and grows quite slowly compared to larger agaves.

== Uses ==
Some of the indigenous peoples of the region consume the plant as a food source. The immature flowering stalks are sweet and juicy and easy to harvest. People either eat them raw or brew them into alcoholic beverages. The leaf bases are also edible, but require roasting to destroy unpleasant chemical compounds
