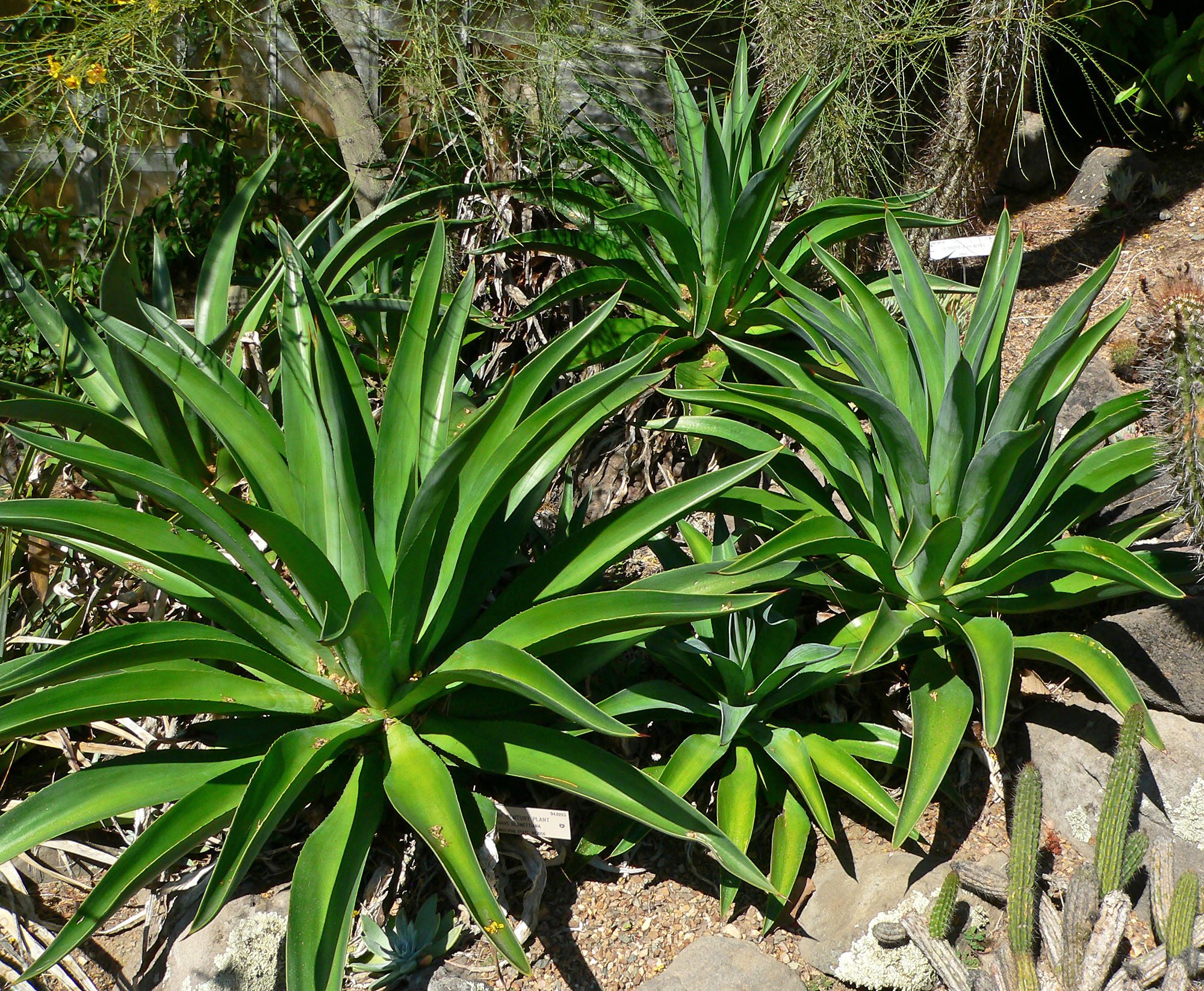

Scientific classification
- Kingdom: Plantae
- Clade: Tracheophytes
- Clade: Angiosperms
- Clade: Monocots
- Order: Asparagales
- Family: Asparagaceae
- Subfamily: Agavoideae
- Genus: Agave
- Species: A. demeesteriana

Binomial name
- Agave demeesteriana Jacobi

Synonyms
- Agave ananassoides DeJonghe & Jacobi; Agave miradorensis Jacobi; Agave miradorensis var. regeliana (Jacobi) A.Terracc.; Agave regeliana Jacobi

= Agave demeesteriana =

Species of flowering plant

Agave demeesteriana is a species of flowering plant in the family Asparagaceae. It is reported as native to the Mexican states of Sinaloa and Veracruz and reportedly naturalized in Florida.
