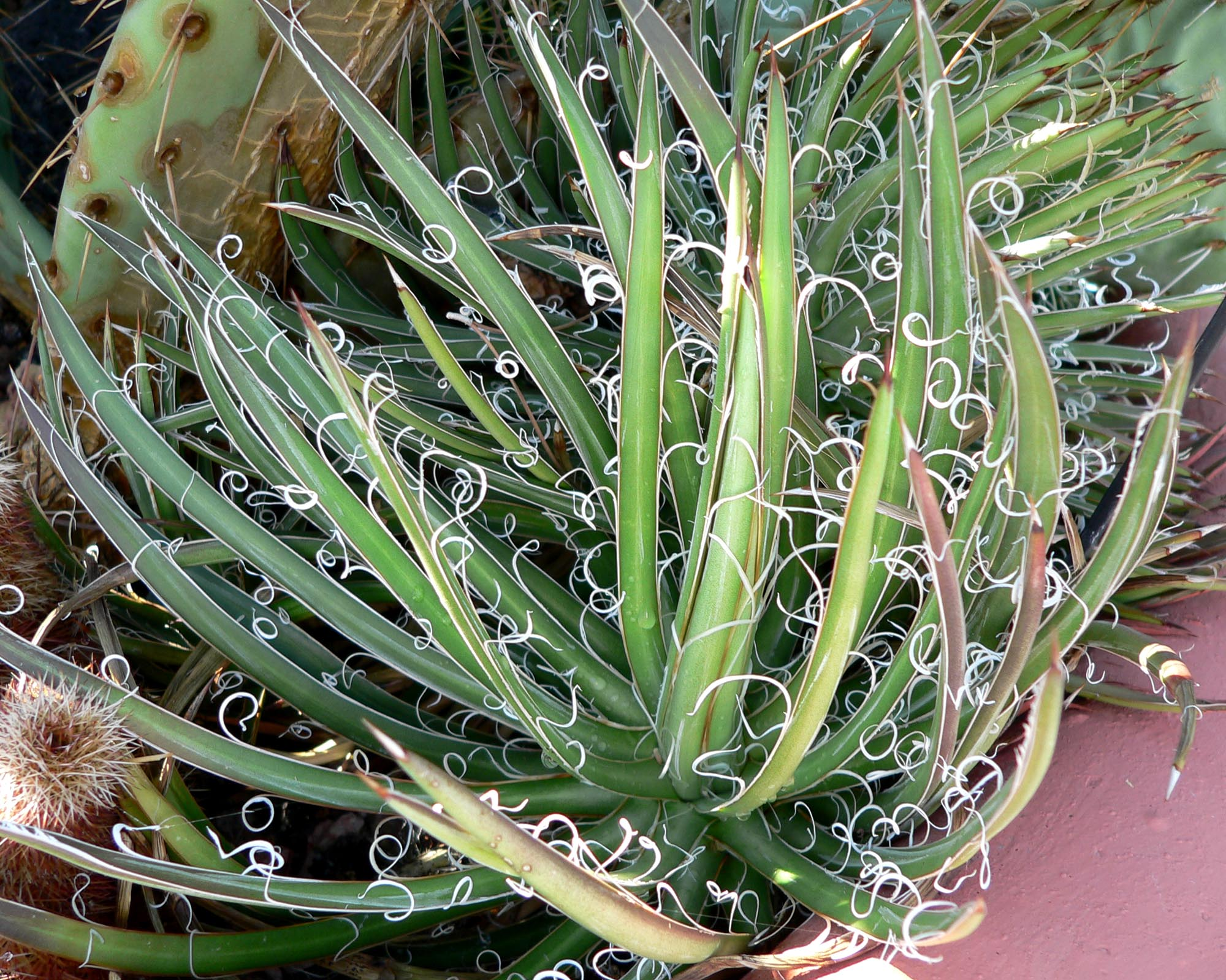
- At the Springs Preserve gardens in Las Vegas

Scientific classification
- Kingdom: Plantae
- Clade: Tracheophytes
- Clade: Angiosperms
- Clade: Monocots
- Order: Asparagales
- Family: Asparagaceae
- Subfamily: Agavoideae
- Genus: Agave
- Species: A. × leopoldii

Binomial name
- Agave × leopoldii W.Watson

Synonyms
- Agave × disceptata J.R.Drumm.; non Agave leopoldii Rafarin

= Agave × leopoldii =

Hybrid species of flowering plant

Agave × leopoldii is a hybrid species of flowering plant in the family Asparagaceae. It is the result of a cross between Agave filifera and Agave schidigera, conducted in the 1870s by W.B. Kellock in Stamford Hill, London, and does not strongly resemble either parent. It has gained the Royal Horticultural Society's Award of Garden Merit as an ornamental.
