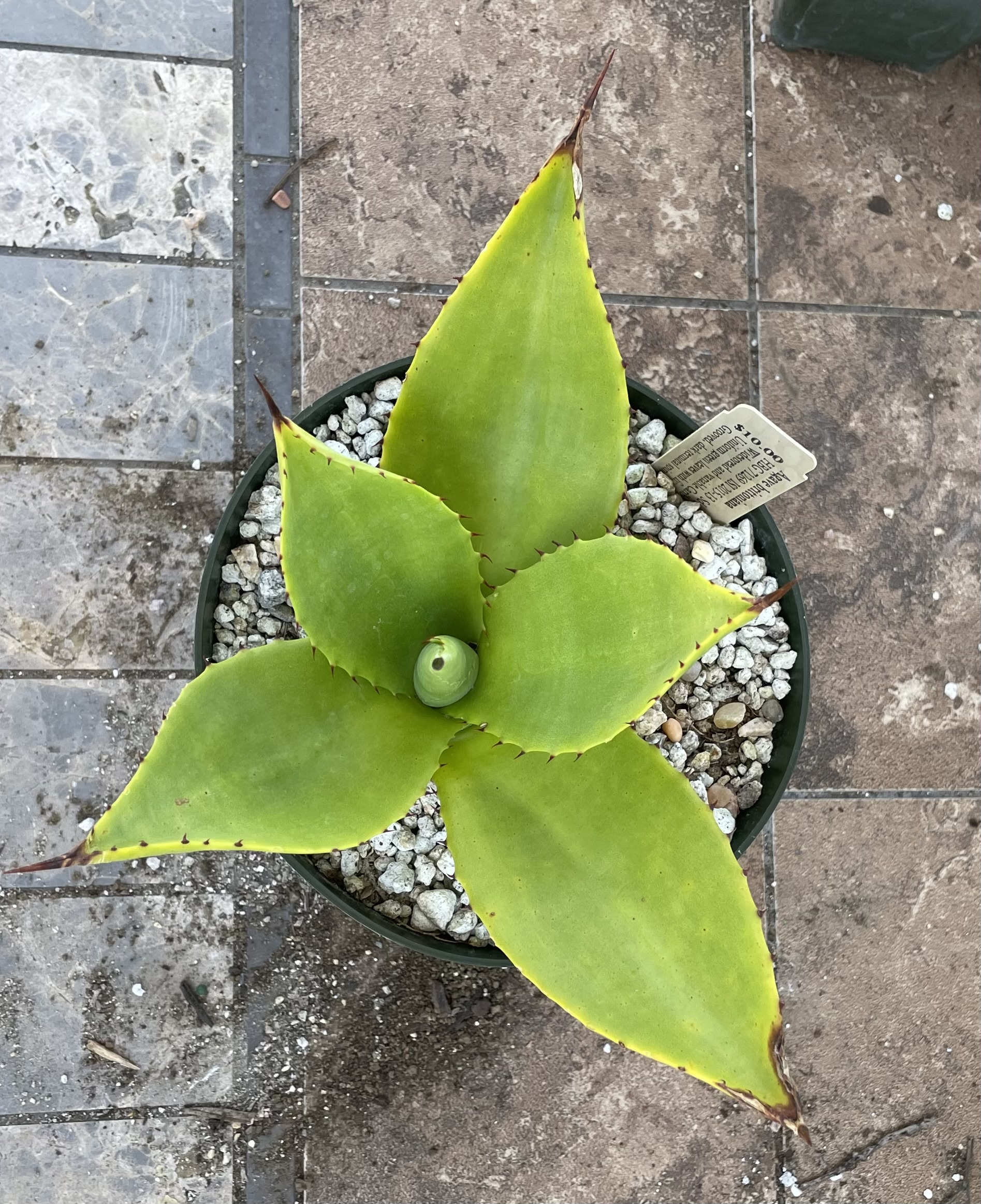

Scientific classification
- Kingdom: Plantae
- Clade: Tracheophytes
- Clade: Angiosperms
- Clade: Monocots
- Order: Asparagales
- Family: Asparagaceae
- Subfamily: Agavoideae
- Genus: Agave
- Species: A. brittoniana

Binomial name
- Agave brittoniana Trel.

= Agave brittoniana =

Species of Aloe

Agave brittoniana is a species of plant native to Cuba. It was first described in 1913 in the Mem. Natl. Acad. Sci. by William Trelease.

== Description of the plant ==
This is a light green agave. This agave is very rare outside of Cuba, therefore not much is known about their flowers. Its terminal spine, which is the spine on the end of leaves on all agaves, looks like polished ebony which fades out to mahogany wood look. Like many Caribbean agaves, this plant is uniformly green except for the spination. These tend to get big, like Agave americana. Due to its rarity in cultivation, frost tenderness is not well known.

== Distribution ==
This plant is very common in Cuba and is widespread there, but is very rare in cultivation.
