= Agave delamateri =

Conservation status
- Imperiled (NatureServe)

Scientific classification
- Kingdom: Plantae
- Clade: Embryophytes
- Clade: Tracheophytes
- Clade: Angiosperms
- Clade: Monocots
- Order: Asparagales
- Family: Asparagaceae
- Subfamily: Agavoideae
- Genus: Agave
- Species: A. delamateri

Binomial name
- Agave delamateri Hodgson & Slauson

Species of flowering plant

Agave delamateri is a species of plant in the agave subfamily, Agavoideae. It is known by the common names Tonto Basin agave and Rick's agave. It is endemic to central Arizona in the United States. It is generally found on gravelly soils in desert scrub and sometimes pinyon-juniper woodland, often near Mogollon or Salado archaeological sites.

Agave delamateri is an acaulescent (trunkless) species forming rosettes up to 100 cm (40 inches) in diameter. Leaves are up to 70 cm (28 inches) long, with a waxy coat giving them a bluish-green appearance. Leaves are well-armed, with teeth along the margins and on the tip. The flowering stalk can be up to 6 m (20 feet) tall, with flowers cream-colored with a greenish tinge.

This species is only known from a population of about 70 to 90 individuals in Gila, Maricopa, and Yavapai Counties in Arizona. These plants are all clones producing no fertile seed. The mature plant reproduces by sprouting "pups" from its base. The oldest existing mature clones may be hundreds of years old and there is practically no variation between them. The clones may be descendants of a cultivated population bred by pre-Columbian peoples.
