= Agave yavapaiensis =

Page Springs agave

Conservation status
- Critically Imperiled (NatureServe)

Scientific classification
- Kingdom: Plantae
- Clade: Tracheophytes
- Clade: Angiosperms
- Clade: Monocots
- Order: Asparagales
- Family: Asparagaceae
- Subfamily: Agavoideae
- Genus: Agave
- Species: A. yavapaiensis

Binomial name
- Agave yavapaiensis W.C.Hodgs. & Salywon

Species of plant

Agave yavapaiensis, the Page Springs agave, is a perennial plant in the family Asparagaceae, subfamily Agavoideae.

== Etymology ==
The scientific name makes reference to both Yavapai County and the Yavapai people, while the common name refers to the area where it occurs, Page Springs, Arizona.

== Description ==
Agave yavapaiensis is a perennial rosette-forming plant with succulent leaves, 60-70 cm tall and wide and producing abundant offsets. The leaves are narrowly elliptic to linear-oblanceolate, abruptly pointed, blue-green gray, with marginal teeth ranging from porrect to deflexed. Flowers have a sweet musky smell and are produced in clusters in large inflorescences 4-6 m tall. Tepals are greenish-yellow, the stamens are cream-yellow, and the ovary is green to dark green. The fruits are linear to linear-oblong, with valves 8–12 mm wide, stipes 4.5–6 mm long. Fully mature seeds are 4×5 mm. The species is diploid.

== Distribution ==
The species is only known from Yavapai County in Arizona. It grows primarily on rocky, igneous substrates, though it has been found on calcareous soils as well. It grows at altitudes of 1000–1700 m.

== Domestication ==
All populations of Agave yavapaiensis grow near archaeological sites from the Pre-Columbian Sinagua culture. The species reproduces mainly by offsets and only produces few viable seeds. As such, it is believed that it was domesticated and farmed by the Sinagua culture, likely for multiple uses including food, fibre and for making beverages. Apart from the abundant production of offsets, Agave yavapaiensis shows other traits that would have promoted harvesting and production, including a large size, small, curved marginal teeth on the leaves, ease of cut, and a very sweet taste when roasted. Cultivation was likely abandoned post-1450 CE following the decline, reorganization and migration of indigenous people in the American Southwest, but the species persisted in areas where it was formerly cultivated.

== Conservation ==
Agave yavapaiensis is listed as a Sensitive Species by the United States Forest Service.
