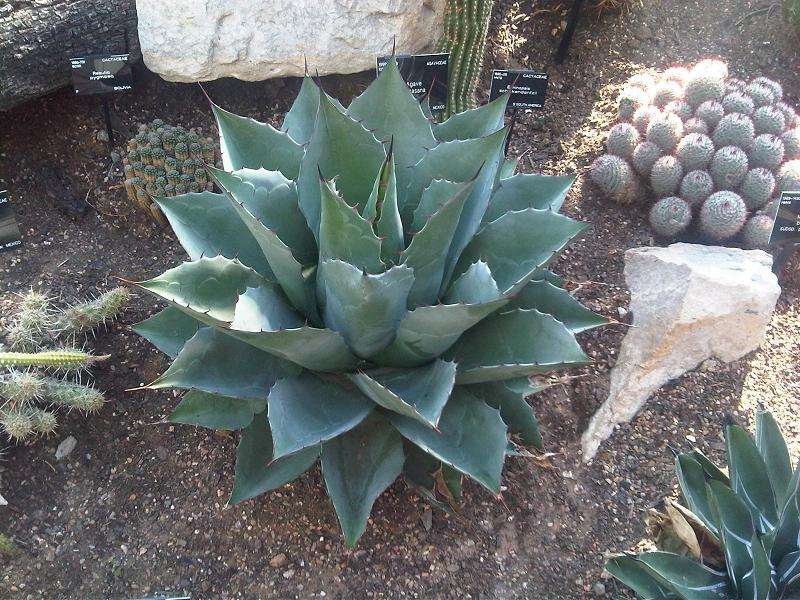
- in Kew Gardens
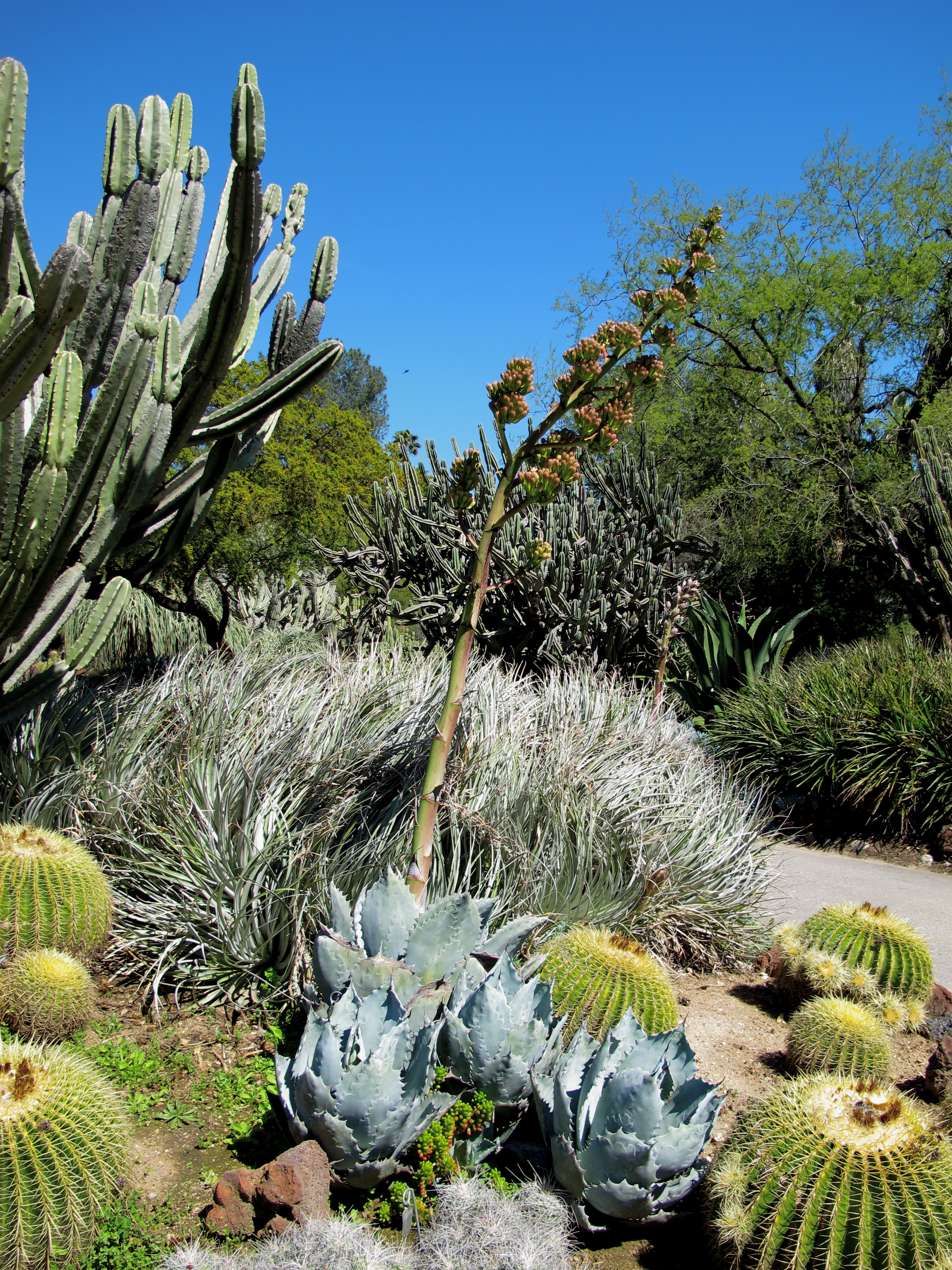
- Inflorescence

Conservation status
- Least Concern (IUCN 3.1)

Scientific classification
- Kingdom: Plantae
- Clade: Tracheophytes
- Clade: Angiosperms
- Clade: Monocots
- Order: Asparagales
- Family: Asparagaceae
- Subfamily: Agavoideae
- Genus: Agave
- Species: A. colorata

Binomial name
- Agave colorata Gentry

= Agave colorata =

Species of plant

Agave colorata, the mezcal cenizo, is a species of flowering plant in the family Asparagaceae. It is native to Sonora and southwestern Sinaloa in Mexico. A succulent reaching 1 to 1.5 m (3 to 5 ft), it is typically found on rocky outcrops in desert or dry scrubland at elevations from 50 to 500 m (200 to 1,600 ft). It has been assessed as Least Concern. Valued as an ornamental for its blue-grey leaves, it is available from commercial suppliers.

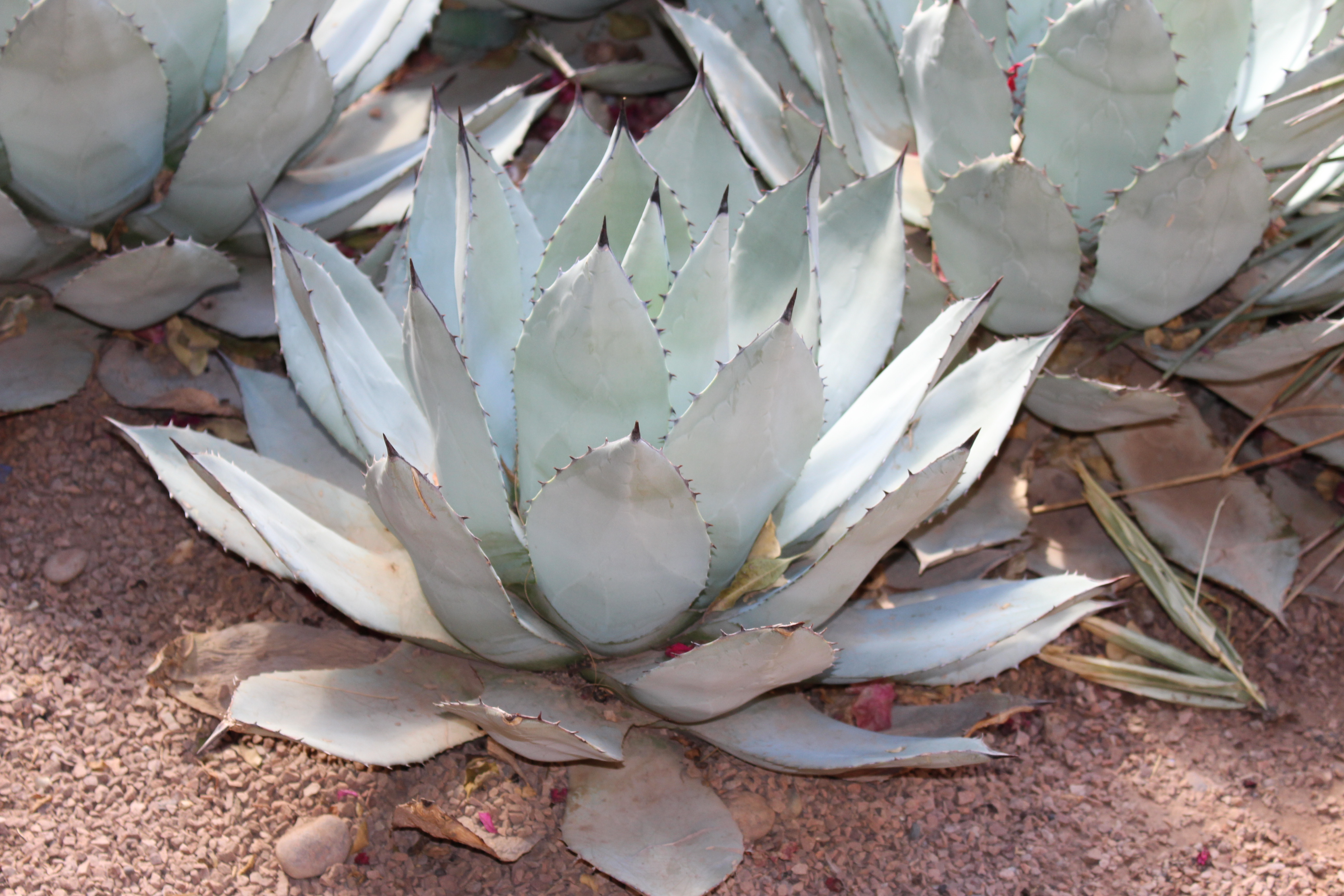
In Majorelle Garden, Marrakesh

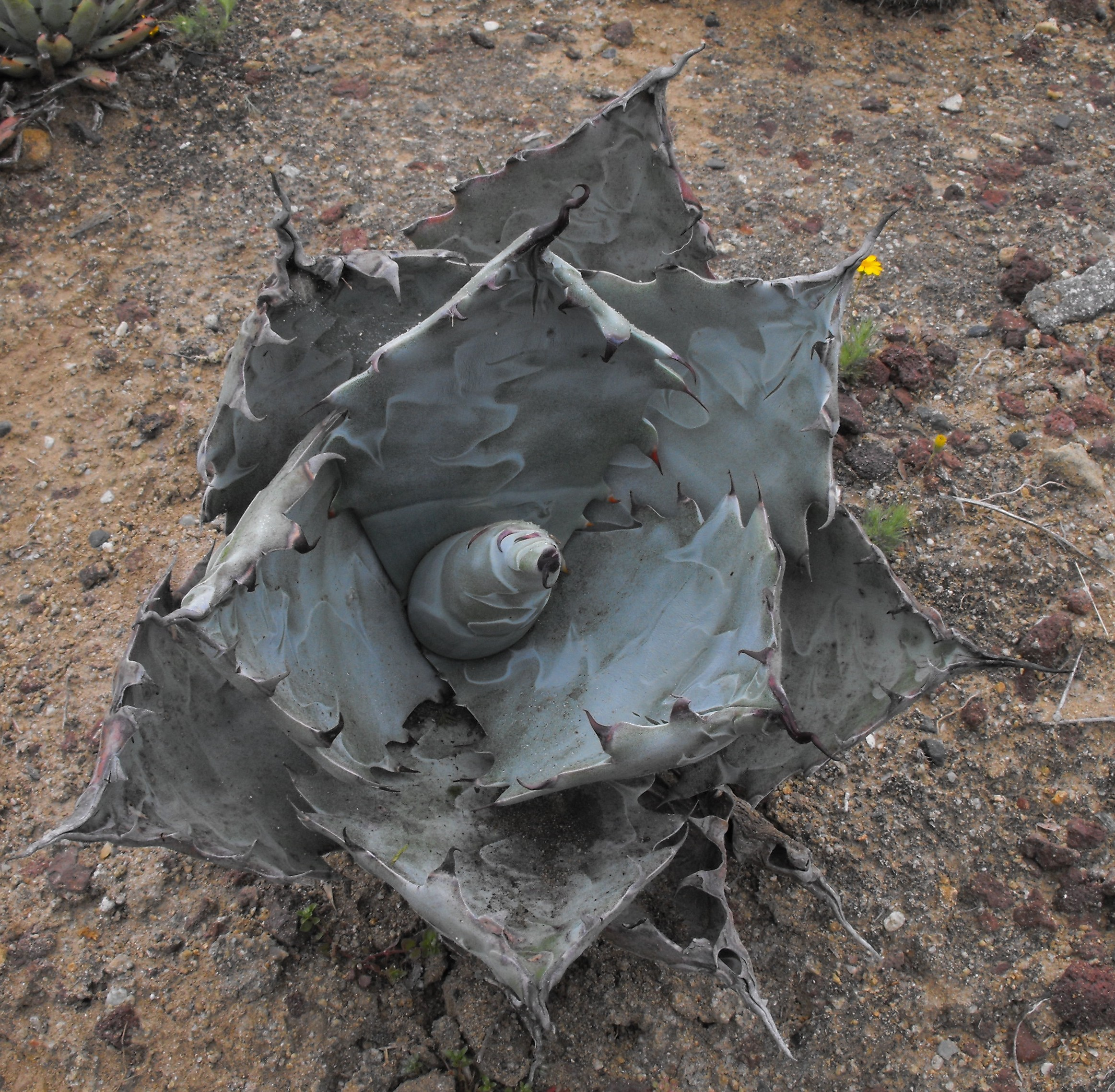
Wavy patterns are visible
