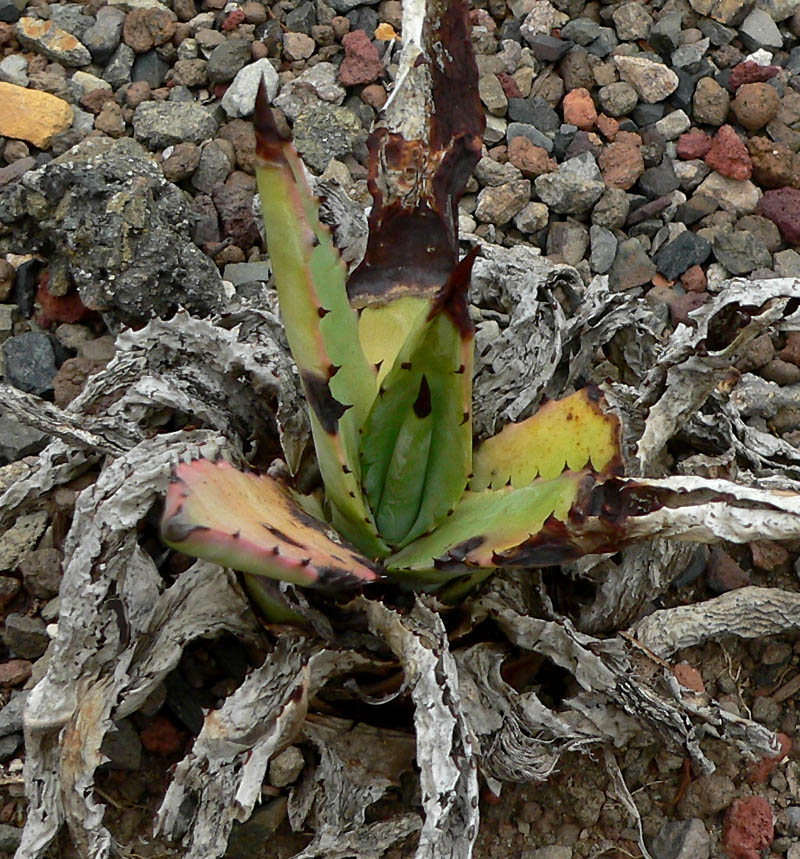

Conservation status
- Near Threatened (IUCN 3.1)

- Apparently Secure (NatureServe)

Scientific classification
- Kingdom: Plantae
- Clade: Tracheophytes
- Clade: Angiosperms
- Clade: Monocots
- Order: Asparagales
- Family: Asparagaceae
- Subfamily: Agavoideae
- Genus: Agave
- Species: A. mckelveyana

Binomial name
- Agave mckelveyana Gentry

= Agave mckelveyana =

Species of flowering plant

Agave mckelveyana, common name McKelvey's century plant, is a species endemic to west-central Arizona, at elevations of 800–2,200 m (2,600–7,200 ft).

Agave mckelveyana is an acaulescent (trunkless) species, usually producing a single rosette but sometimes growing suckers. Leaves are up to 40 cm (16 in) long, with spines along the margins and at the tip. The flowering stalk can be up to 5 m (16 ft) tall, with yellowish flowers.
