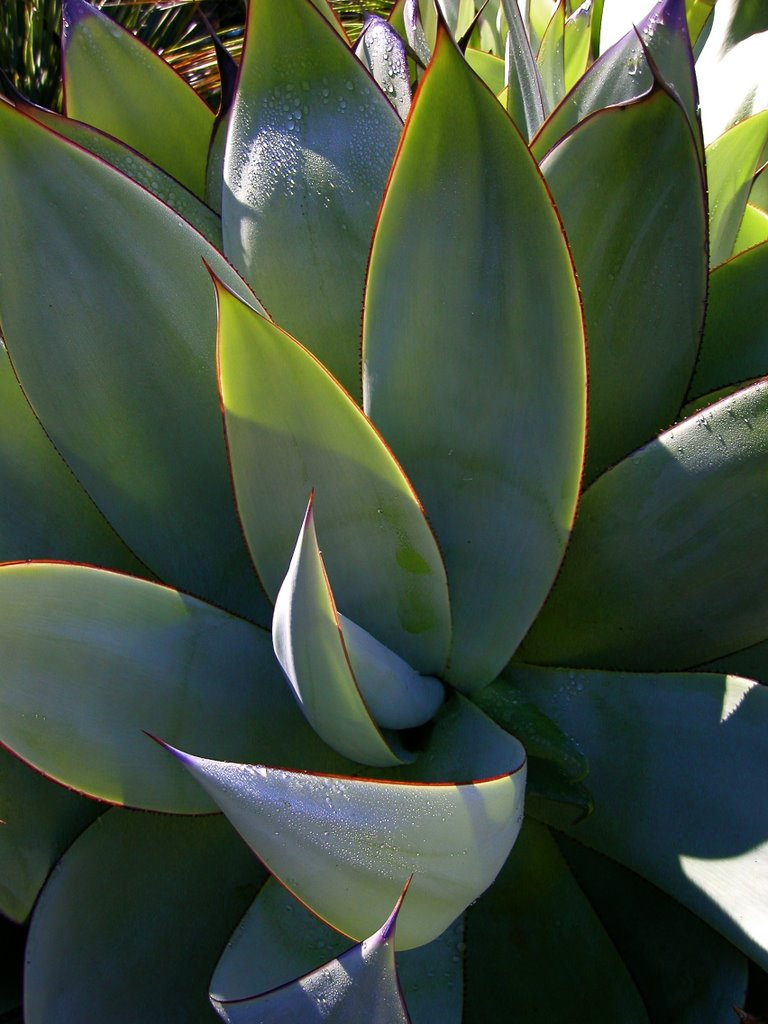
- A. mitis var. mitis

Conservation status
- Least Concern (IUCN 3.1)

Scientific classification
- Kingdom: Plantae
- Clade: Tracheophytes
- Clade: Angiosperms
- Clade: Monocots
- Order: Asparagales
- Family: Asparagaceae
- Subfamily: Agavoideae
- Genus: Agave
- Species: A. mitis

Binomial name
- Agave mitis Mart.

Synonyms
- Agave albicans Jacobi; Agave botteri Baker; Agave bouchei Jacobi; Agave celsiana Jacobi; Agave celsii Hook.; Agave concinna Baker nom. illeg.; Agave densiflora Regel nom. illeg.; Agave haseloffii Jacobi; Agave macrantha Tod.; Agave micracantha Salm-Dyck; Agave oblongata Jacobi; Agave ousselghemiana Jacobi; Agave rupicola Regel; Agave sartorii var. oblongata (Jacobi) A.Terracc.

= Agave mitis =

Species of flowering plant

Agave mitis is a plant species native to the Mexican states of Hidalgo, Tamaulipas and San Luis Potosí, referred to as Agave celsii in many publications.

Agave mitis forms rosettes of blue-green to yellow-green, fleshy leaves up to 60 cm (2 feet) long. The leaves have soft brown spines not nearly as imposing as those of other agaves. The flowering stalk is up to 2.5 m (8 feet) tall, with the flowers closely appressed against the stem forming a narrow column much more compact than most other species of the genus. Flowers are green, each up to 60 mm (2.4 inches) long.

Because the species is widespread and grows in several protected areas, it is not considered by the IUCN to be threatened.
