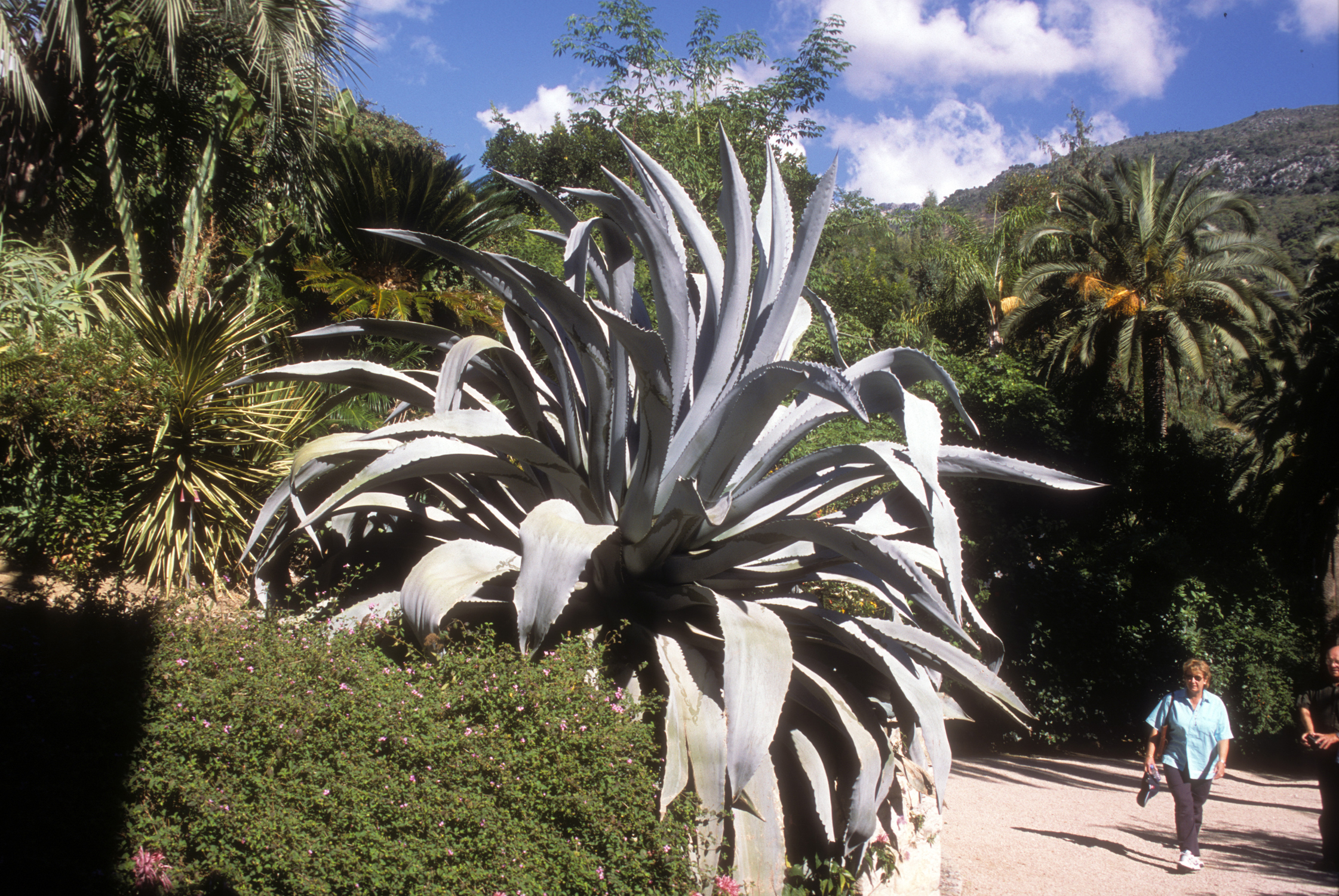

Scientific classification
- Kingdom: Plantae
- Clade: Tracheophytes
- Clade: Angiosperms
- Clade: Monocots
- Order: Asparagales
- Family: Asparagaceae
- Subfamily: Agavoideae
- Genus: Agave
- Species: A. americana
- Variety: A. a. var. franzosini

Trinomial name
- Agave americana var. franzosini Sprenger

Synonyms
- Agave franzosini (Sprenger) P.Sewell, nom. cons.; Agave beaulueriana Jacobi, nom. rej.

= Agave americana var. franzosini =

Variety of flowering plant

Agave america var. franzosini is an evergreen plant in the family Asparagaceae, subfamily Agavoideae. It is widely cultivated in many places, and has been known by several names, including Agave franzosini and Agave beaulueriana. The original reports say that the species is native to Mexico, but a more detailed location was not provided. The species has reportedly become naturalized in the Leeward Islands of the Caribbean, the Canary Islands and Spain. The leaves appear at the base of the plant, its flowers are funnel-shaped and yellow.

The varietal epithet was originally spelt franzosini, but has sometimes been changed to franzosinii. As of November 2024, the International Plant Names Index states that as no etymology was provided in the original, the epithet should remain as published.
