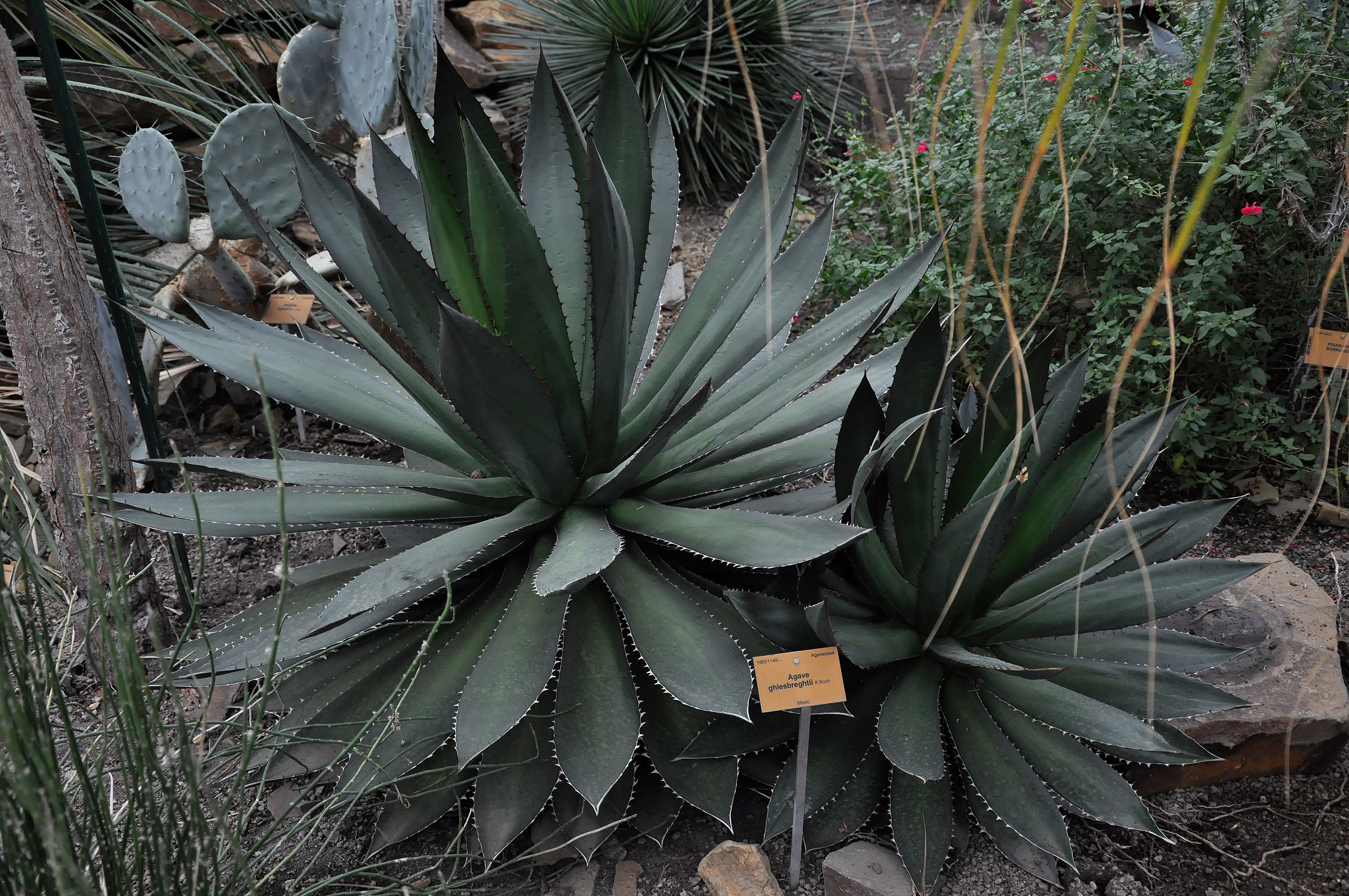
- Growing at the National Botanic Garden of Belgium

Conservation status
- Least Concern (IUCN 3.1)

Scientific classification
- Kingdom: Plantae
- Clade: Tracheophytes
- Clade: Angiosperms
- Clade: Monocots
- Order: Asparagales
- Family: Asparagaceae
- Subfamily: Agavoideae
- Genus: Agave
- Species: A. ghiesbreghtii

Binomial name
- Agave ghiesbreghtii Lem. ex Jacobi

= Agave ghiesbreghtii =

Species of flowering plant

Agave ghiesbreghtii is an evergreen plant belonging to the family Asparagaceae, subfamily Agavoideae. The plant grows in clustering rosettes, up to 75 cm in diameter and 50 cm tall with wide leaves which are guttered on top. In spring the plant produces dense greenish brown to purple flowers on the top half of the unbranched spike which measures between 2.5m - 5m tall. The species is endemic in Guatemala and the State of Mexico in Mexico.
