= Agave sanpedroensis =

Scientific classification
- Kingdom: Plantae
- Clade: Tracheophytes
- Clade: Angiosperms
- Clade: Monocots
- Order: Asparagales
- Family: Asparagaceae
- Subfamily: Agavoideae
- Genus: Agave
- Species: A. sanpedroensis

Binomial name
- Agave sanpedroensis W.C.Hodgs. & Salywon

Species of plant

Agave sanpedroensis, the San Pedro agave, is a perennial plant in the family Asparagaceae, subfamily Agavoideae.

== Etymology ==
The scientific name makes reference to the San Pedro River Valley, Arizona.

== Description ==
Agave sanpedroensis is a perennial rosette-forming plant with succulent leaves, 50–70 cm tall and wide and producing abundant offsets. The leaves are stiffly upright, gray to grayish green, with conspicuous banding and white bud-imprinting, and undulate margins. Inflorescences are sinuous and narrow, with sigmoid peduncles in the upper third or two-fifths of the stalk. The flowering season is short (July to August) and synchronous, i.e. all plants that flower in a given year develop around the same time. The species is polyploid and apparently sterile, as capsules do not form.

== Distribution ==
The species is known from few sites in Pinal and Pima counties in Arizona, at altitudes between 914 and 1117 m, along the San Pedro River and the slopes of the Tortolita Mountains.

== Domestication ==
All populations of Agave sanpedroensis grow near archaeological sites from the Pre-Columbian Hohokam culture, dated to approximately 800 to 1450 CE, including farming sites. The species appears to be entirely sterile and reproduces only by offsets. As such, it is believed that it was domesticated and farmed by the Hohokam culture, likely for multiple uses including food, fibre and for making beverages. Apart from the abundant production of offsets, Agave verdensis shows other traits that would have promoted harvesting and production, including a short, well-defined flowering period, small curved marginal teeth on the leaves, and ease of cut. Cultivation was likely abandoned post-1450 CE following the decline, reorganization and migration of indigenous people in the American Southwest, but the species persisted in areas where it was formerly cultivated.
