= Agave verdensis =

Conservation status
- Imperiled (NatureServe)

Scientific classification
- Kingdom: Plantae
- Clade: Tracheophytes
- Clade: Angiosperms
- Clade: Monocots
- Order: Asparagales
- Family: Asparagaceae
- Subfamily: Agavoideae
- Genus: Agave
- Species: A. verdensis

Binomial name
- Agave verdensis W.C.Hodgs. & Salywon

Species of plant

Agave verdensis, or the Sacred Mountain agave, is a perennial plant in the family Asparagaceae, subfamily Agavoideae.

== Etymology ==
The scientific name makes reference to Verde Valley, Arizona where the species occurs, while the common name refers to the Sacred Mountain archaeological site, as the species grows nearby and is believed to have been cultivated by the same culture.

== Description ==
Agave verdensis is a perennial rosette-forming plant with succulent leaves, 50–60 cm tall and wide and producing abundant offsets. The leaves are short-lanceolate to short-oblanceolate, pointed, bluish gray, maroon distally, typically with marginal teeth bent downwards but occasionally upright, upturned or recurved. Flowers have a sweet musky smell and are produced in clusters in large inflorescences 4.5-6 m tall. Tepals are greenish, the stamens are cream-yellow, and the ovary is light green. The fruits are linear-oblong to obovoid, with valves 11–18 mm wide, stipes 1–4 mm long. Fully mature seeds are 5×6.5 mm. The species is diploid. The flowering season is short (late June to mid July) and synchronous, i.e. all plants that flower in a given year develop around the same time.

== Distribution ==
The species grows on rocky substrates in Coconino and Yavapai counties in Arizona at altitudes between 900 and 1500 m.

== Domestication ==
All populations of Agave verdensis grow near archaeological sites from the Pre-Columbian Sinagua culture, dated to approximately 1100 to 1400 CE, and which include sites of major settlements as well as important farming and trade sites. The species reproduces mainly by offsets and only produces a few seeds in the upper branches of the inflorescence.As such, it is believed that it was domesticated and farmed by the Sinagua culture, likely for multiple uses including food, fibre and for making beverages. Apart from the abundant production of offsets, Agave verdensis shows other traits that would have promoted harvesting and production, including a short, well-defined flowering period, small downward-facing marginal teeth on the leaves, ease of cut, and a very sweet taste when roasted. Cultivation was likely abandoned post-1450 CE following the decline, reorganization and migration of indigenous people in the American Southwest, but the species persisted in areas where it was formerly cultivated.

== Conservation ==
Agave verdensis is listed as a Sensitive Species by the United States Forest Service.
