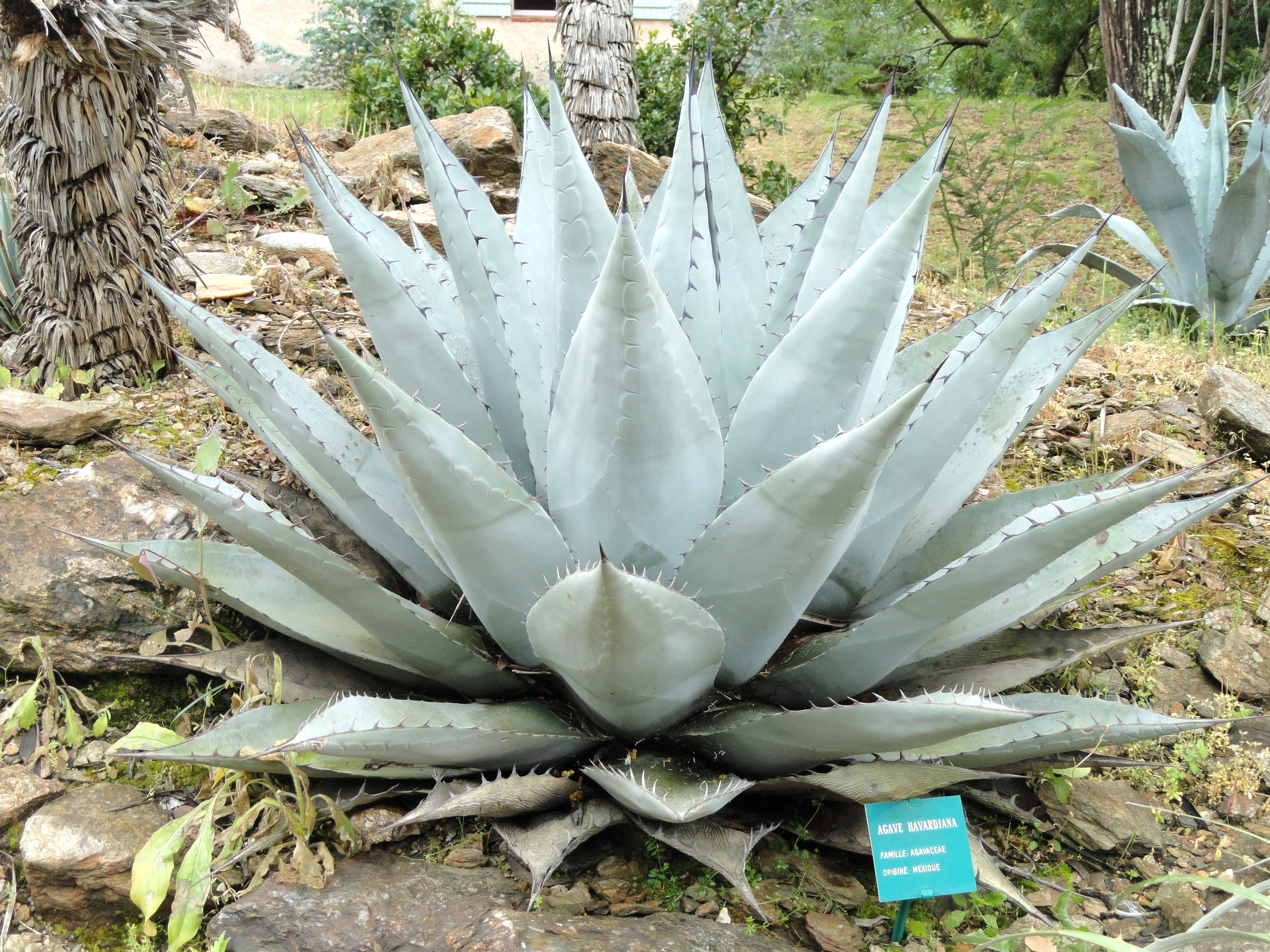
- Agave havardiana specimen in the Jardin d'oiseaux tropicaux, La Londe-les-Maures, France.

Conservation status
- Vulnerable (IUCN 3.1)

- Apparently Secure (NatureServe)

Scientific classification
- Kingdom: Plantae
- Clade: Tracheophytes
- Clade: Angiosperms
- Clade: Monocots
- Order: Asparagales
- Family: Asparagaceae
- Subfamily: Agavoideae
- Genus: Agave
- Species: A. havardiana

Binomial name
- Agave havardiana Trel.

= Agave havardiana =

Species of flowering plant

Agave havardiana is a plant species native to the Big Bend area of western Texas as well as Chihuahua and Coahuila. It prefers grassy to rocky slopes or woodlands at elevations of 1200–2000 m.

Agave havardiana is an acaulescent species forming rosettes low to the ground, sometimes creating suckers but not forming large colonies like some other species. Leaves are up to 70 cm (28 inches) long, with teeth along the margins and at the tip. Flowering stalks can be up to 7 m (23 feet) tall, with yellow to yellow-green flowers. Fruits are dry, oblong, up to 6 cm (2.4 inches) long.

This species is under threat from habitat loss, mostly for cattle ranching.
