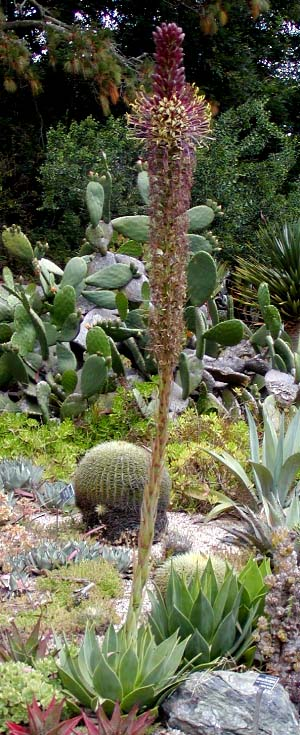
- In bloom

Conservation status
- Vulnerable (IUCN 3.1)

Scientific classification
- Kingdom: Plantae
- Clade: Tracheophytes
- Clade: Angiosperms
- Clade: Monocots
- Order: Asparagales
- Family: Asparagaceae
- Subfamily: Agavoideae
- Genus: Agave
- Species: A. chiapensis

Binomial name
- Agave chiapensis Jacobi

Synonyms
- Agave teopiscana Matuda

= Agave chiapensis =

Species of flowering plant

Agave chiapensis is a species of Agave native to the Mexican states of Chiapas and Oaxaca. It has also been reported from Costa Rica and Guatemala. Populations of this species are relatively small and isolated, and are threatened by urban and agricultural expansion, particularly in Chiapas.

It is a medium-sized agave, with spreading rosettes of light green leaves that are variable, but tend toward the ovate. The teeth of the leaf margins are deltoid and may be found either small (3–4 mm) and closely spaced, or larger (5–10 mm) and further apart. The strong terminal spine of the leaf is 2–3.5 cm in length.

The flower spike typically reaches 2 m in height, with the flowers spread along the upper third to quarter of its length. The flowers are 60–70 mm long, and yellow or green in color, but flushed with red or purple shading, as well as the bractlets, giving an overall darker appearance. The filaments are also dark and at 70–80 mm extend far out of the flower, with 30-mm anthers on the ends.
