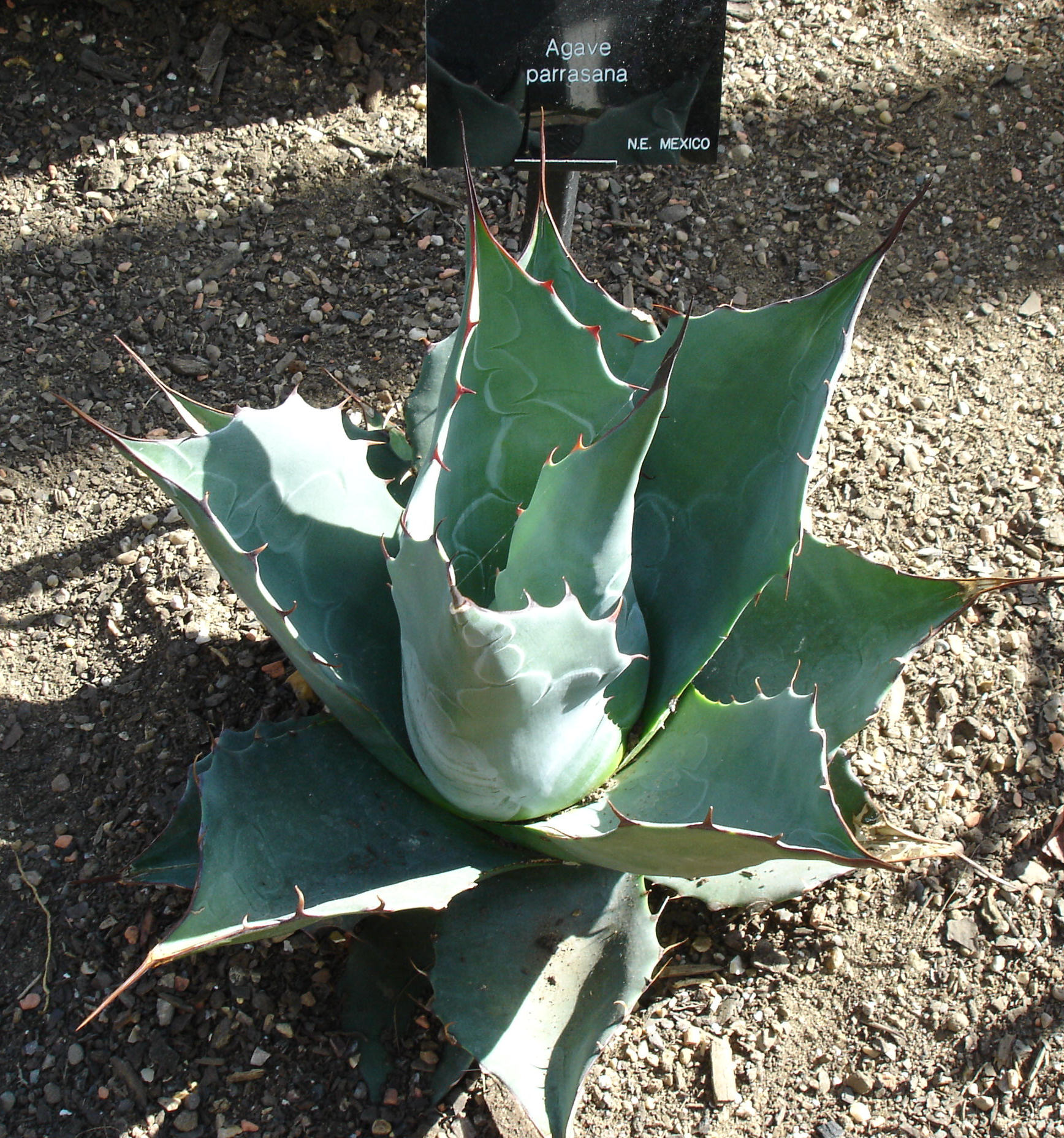
- Kew Gardens, August 2005 (Bluemoose)

Conservation status
- Vulnerable (IUCN 3.1)

Scientific classification
- Kingdom: Plantae
- Clade: Embryophytes
- Clade: Tracheophytes
- Clade: Spermatophytes
- Clade: Angiosperms
- Clade: Monocots
- Order: Asparagales
- Family: Asparagaceae
- Subfamily: Agavoideae
- Genus: Agave
- Species: A. parrasana

Binomial name
- Agave parrasana A.Berger

Synonyms
- Agave wislizeni subsp. parrasana

= Agave parrasana =

Species of flowering plant

Agave parrasana, the cabbage head agave or cabbage head century plant, is a flowering plant in the family Asparagaceae. A slow-growing evergreen succulent from North East Mexico, it produces a compact rosette of fleshy thorn-tipped grey-green leaves, 60 cm (24 in) tall and wide. The leaves are blue green and the thorns are red. The whole plant may reach 100 cm (39 in) tall and wide. Occasionally, mature plants produce a spectacular flower head up to 6 m (20 ft) tall, opening red and turning yellow. This signals the death of the flowering rosette. However, offsets may form and continue growing.

As it can tolerate temperatures of −12 °C (10 °F) or less, it is a popular plant to grow outdoors in a sheltered cactus garden or similar environment, and has gained the Royal Horticultural Society's Award of Garden Merit. In the US, it may be grown outdoors in USDA hardiness zones 7–10. It is susceptible to scale and chlorosis resulting from magnesium deficiency.
