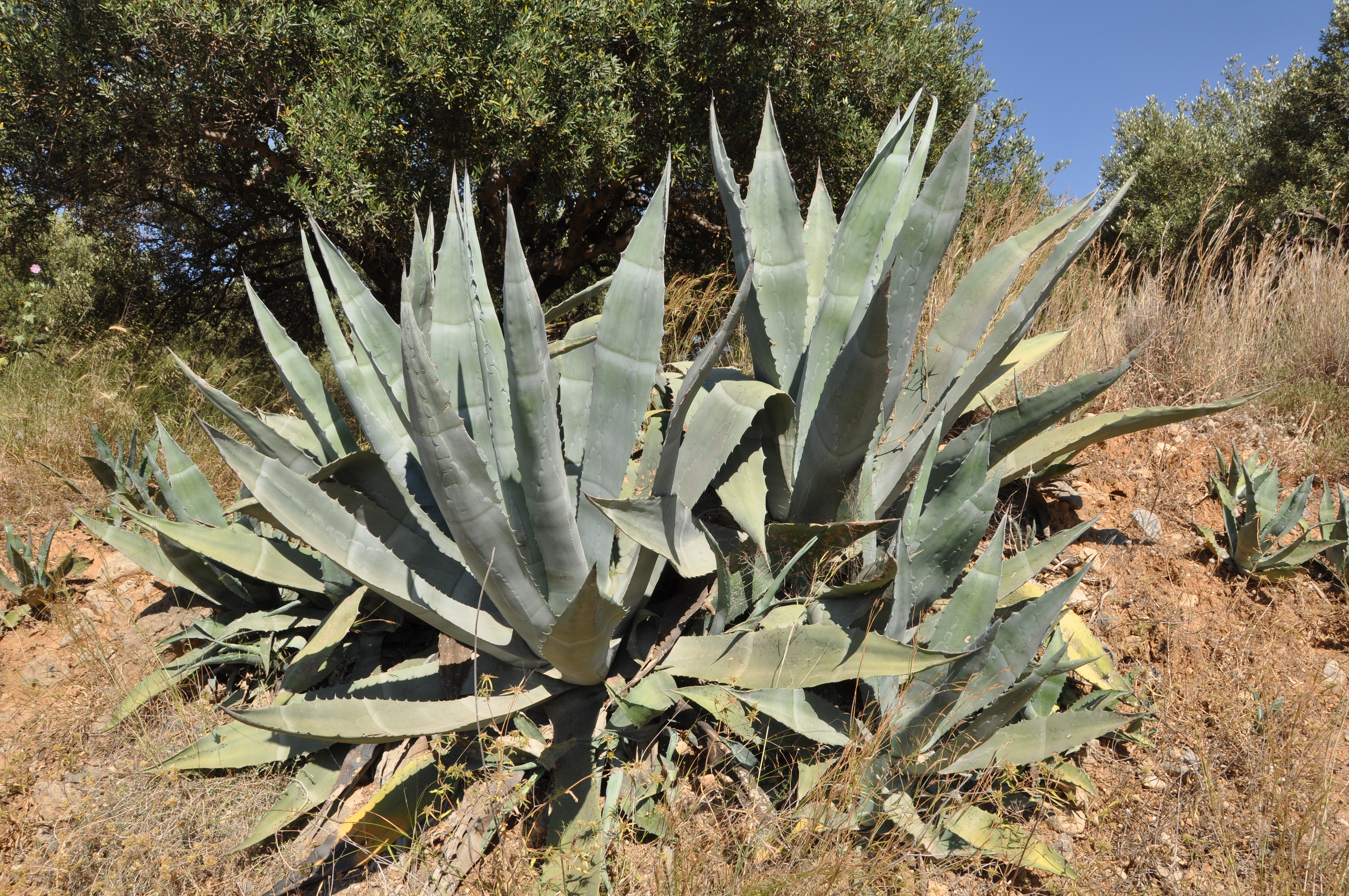
- Agave americana

Scientific classification
- Kingdom: Plantae
- Clade: Tracheophytes
- Clade: Angiosperms
- Clade: Monocots
- Order: Asparagales
- Family: Asparagaceae
- Subfamily: Agavoideae
- Genus: Agave; L.

Type species
- Agave americana Linnaeus, 1753

Species
- See text. See also full listing.

Synonyms
- Delpinoa H.Ross; Ghiesbreghtia Roezl; Littaea Tagl.

= Agave =

Genus of flowering plants

Agave (/əˈɡɑːvi/; also UK: /əˈɡeɪvi/; Anglo-Hispanic, also US: /əˈɡɑːveɪ/) is a genus of monocots native to the arid regions of the Americas. The genus is primarily known for its succulent and xerophytic species that typically form large rosettes of strong, fleshy leaves.

Many plants in this genus may be considered perennial, because they require several to many years to mature and flower. However, most Agave species are more accurately described as monocarpic rosettes or multiannuals, since each individual rosette flowers only once and then dies; a small number of Agave species are polycarpic.

Along with plants from the closely related genera Yucca, Hesperoyucca, and Hesperaloe, various Agave species are popular ornamental plants in hot, dry climates, as they require very little supplemental water to survive. Most Agave species grow very slowly. Some Agave species are known by the common name "century plant".

Maguey is a Spanish word that refers to all of the large-leafed plants in the Asparagaceae family, including agaves and yuccas. Maguey flowers are eaten in many indigenous culinary traditions of Mesoamerica.

== Nomenclature ==
Agave as natively known among the Aztecs are called metl (Nahuatl pronunciation: [ˈmetɬ]).

As they were introduced to the 'Old World', they gained various new local names: the Maltese referred to them as sabbara (related to Arabic: صَبَّارَة, romanized: ṣabbāra); Agave americana is sabbara tal-Amerika while A. sisalana is sabbara ta' Sisal. In East Asia, agaves have been dubbed with the Sino-Xenic compound word 'dragon tongue orchid' (simplified Chinese: 龙舌兰; traditional Chinese: 龍舌蘭; pinyin: lóngshélán; Japanese: 竜舌蘭, romanized: ryūzetsuran; Korean: 용설란; Hanja: 龍舌蘭; RR: yongseollan).

== Description ==
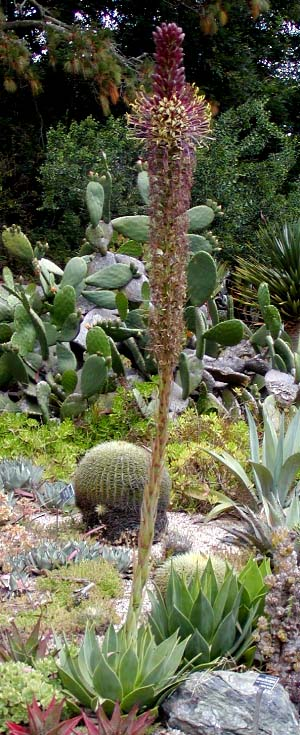
The large flower spike of Agave chiapensis, San Francisco Botanical Garden

The succulent leaves of most Agave species have sharp marginal teeth, an extremely sharp terminal spine, and are very fibrous inside. The stout stem is usually extremely short, which may make the plant appear as though it is stemless.

Agave rosettes are mostly monocarpic, though some species are polycarpic. During flowering, a tall stem or "mast" ("quiote" in Mexico), which can grow to be 12 metres (40 feet) high, and Agave salmiana can be significantly taller. The panicle grows apically from the center of the rosette and bears a large number of short, tubular flowers and sometimes vegetatively produced bulbils (a form of asexual reproduction). After pollination/fertilization and subsequent fruit development, in monocarpic species, the original rosette dies. However, throughout the lifetime of many Agave species, rhizomatous suckers develop above the roots at the base of the rosette. These suckers go on to form new plants after the original rosette desiccates and dies. Not all agaves produce suckers throughout their lifetimes; some species rarely or never produce suckers, while others may only develop suckers after final maturation with inflorescence. Some varieties can live for 60 years before flowering.

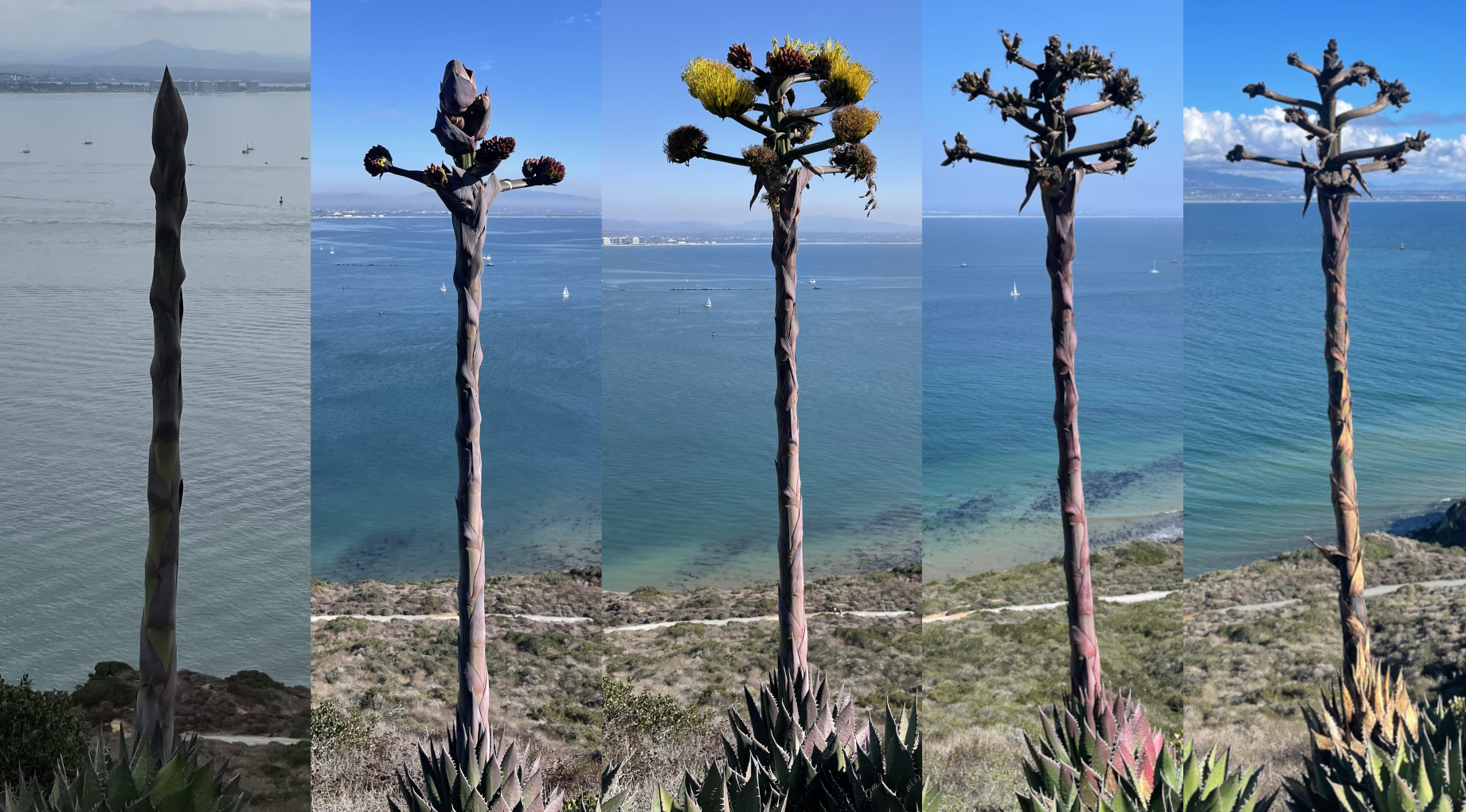
Agave shawii mast before, during, and after flowering, Cabrillo National Monument

Agaves can be confused with cacti, aloes, or stonecrops, but although these plants all share similar morphological adaptations to arid environments (e.g. succulence), each group belongs to a different plant family and probably experienced convergent evolution. Further, cactus (Cactaceae) and stonecrop (Crassulaceae) lineages are eudicots, while aloes (Asphodelaceae) and agaves (Asparagaceae) are monocots.

=== Adaptations ===
The agave root system, consisting of a network of shallow rhizomes, allows the agave to efficiently capture moisture from rain, condensation, and dew. In addition to growing from seeds, most agaves produce 'pups' – young plants from runners. Agave vilmoriniana (the octopus agave) produces hundreds of pups on its bloom stalk. Agave leaves store the plant's water and are crucial to its continued existence. The coated leaf surface prevents evaporation. The leaves also have sharp, spiked edges. The spikes discourage predators from eating the plant or using it as a source of water and are so tough that ancient peoples used them for sewing needles. The sap is acidic. Some agaves bloom at a height up to 9 m (30 ft) so that they are far out of reach to animals that might attack them. Smaller species, such as Agave lechuguilla, have smaller bloom stalks.

== Taxonomy ==
The genus name Agave come from the Ancient Greek αγαυή agauê from ἀγαυός agauós meaning "illustrious, noble" having to do with very tall flower spikes found on its many species.

The genus Agave was erected by Carl Linnaeus in 1753, initially with four species. The first listed was Agave americana, so this became the type species. In the Cronquist system and others, Agave was placed in the family Liliaceae, but phylogenetic analyses of DNA sequences later showed it did not belong there. In the APG II system, Agave was placed in the segregated family Agavaceae. When this system was superseded by the APG III system in 2009, the Agavaceae were subsumed into the expanded family Asparagaceae, and Agave was treated as one of 18 genera in the subfamily Agavoideae, a position retained in the APG IV system of 2016. However, Agavaceae had regained its taxonomic status as an independent family by 2020.

Agaves and close relatives have long presented significant taxonomic difficulty. These difficulties could be due to the relatively young evolutionary age of the group (major diversification events of the group most likely occurred 8–10 million years ago), ease of hybridization between species (and even genera), incomplete lineage sorting, and long generation times. Within a species, morphological variations can be considerable, especially in cultivation; many named species may be variants of original wild-type species that horticulturalists bred to appear unique in cultivation.

With the advent of DNA sequencing, new karyologic and evolutionary phylogenetic studies showed that the genera Manfreda, Polianthes and Prochnyanthes were genetically nested within the traditional circumscription of Agave, rendering the genus paraphyletic. Early in the 21st century, these new phylogenetic results led to a reclassification and inclusion of Manfreda, Polianthes and Prochnyanthes together as Agave subgenus Manfreda.

There was reaction against the changes from those who noted that the large morphological differences between the genera in this new Agave s.l. making them "counter-intuitive from a horticultural point of view". Manfreda morphologically differs from the classic Agave description in being herbaceous and bulbous, while Polianthes are deciduous with narrow leaves and no spines. Mexican taxonomists have continued to adhere to the traditional classifications and have published new species of Polianthes.

Thus, based on a wider consideration of previously established genetic, morphological, and estimated genetic divergence times, Vázquez-García et al. proposed a narrower circumscription of Agave s.str. by creating three new genera: Echinoagave, Paleoagave and Paraagave. These new genera have gained some acceptance, (Note: Plants of the World Online accepts Echinoagave Paleoagave and Paraagave.) and pave the way for a reconsideration of Manfreda, Polianthes and Prochnyanthes.

=== Commonly grown species ===
Some commonly grown species include Agave americana, A. angustifolia, A. attenuata, A. murpheyi, A. palmeri, A. parryi, A. parviflora, A. tequilana, A. victoriae-reginae, and A. vilmoriniana.

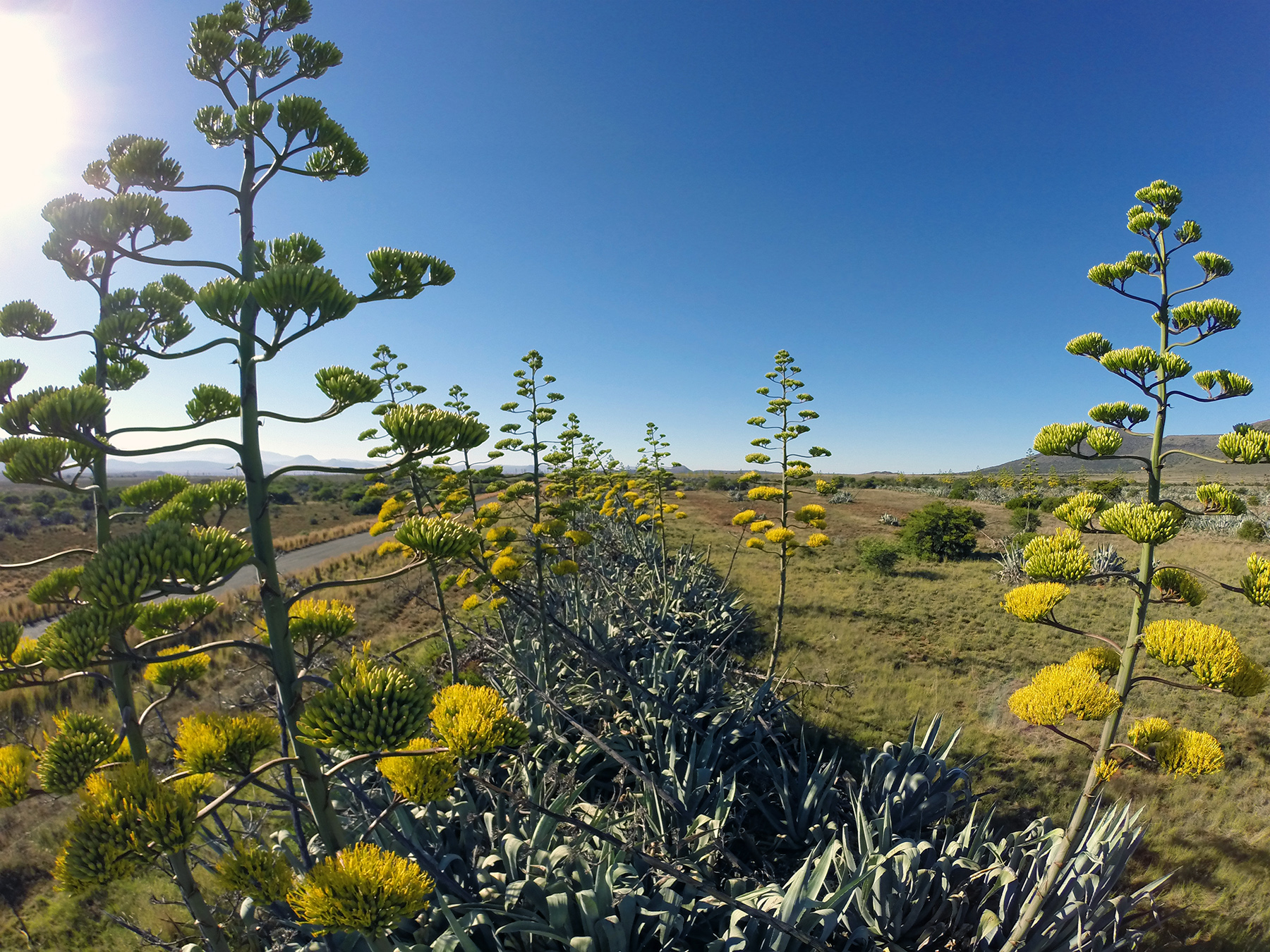
A row of agaves in bloom in the Karoo region of South Africa: the inflorescences of the plants are clearly visible.

In the UK the Plant Heritage collection is held by Ian Mills of Harold Wood in Essex, with 123 species, 76 cultivars and 217 taxa.

=== A. americana ===
One of the most familiar species is A. americana, a native of tropical America. Common names include century plant, maguey (in Mexico), or American aloe (though not related to the genus Aloe). The name "century plant" refers to the long time the plant takes to flower. The number of years before flowering occurs depends on the vigor of the individual plant, the richness of the soil, and the climate; during these years, the plant is storing in its fleshy leaves the nourishment required for the effort of flowering.

A. americana, century plant, was introduced into southern Europe about the middle of the 16th century and is now naturalized as well as widely cultivated as an ornamental, as it is in the Americas. In the variegated forms, the leaf has a white or yellow marginal or central stripe. As the leaves unfold from the center of the rosette, the impression of the marginal spines is conspicuous on the still erect younger leaves. The plant is reported being hardy to −9.5 to −6.5 °C or Zone 8b 15-20f. Being succulents, they tend to rot if kept too wet. In areas such as America's Pacific Northwest, they might be hardy for cold winter temperatures, but need protection from winter rain. They mature very slowly and die after flowering but are easily propagated by the offsets from the base of the stem.

A. americana (a blue variety) occurs in abundance in the Karoo, and arid highland regions of South Africa. Introduced by the British settlers in 1820, the plant was originally cultivated and used as emergency feed for livestock. Today, it is used mainly for the production of syrup and sugar.

=== A. attenuata ===
A. attenuata is a native of central Mexico and is uncommon in its natural habitat. Unlike most species of agave, A. attenuata has a curved flower spike from which it derives one of its numerous common names – the foxtail agave. It is also commonly grown as a garden plant. Unlike many agaves, A. attenuata has no teeth or terminal spines, making it an ideal plant for areas adjacent to footpaths. Like all agaves, it is a succulent and requires little water or maintenance once established, but cannot withstand frost.

=== A. tequilana ===
Agave azul (blue agave) is used in the production of tequila. It is native to the Caribbean as well as many regions of Mexico like Colima, Nayarit, Jalisco and more. In 2001, the Mexican government and European Union agreed upon the classification of tequila and its categories. All 100% blue agave tequila must be made from the A. tequilana 'Weber's Blue' agave plant, to rigorous specifications and only in the state of Jalisco. Blue agave is significantly different from other types of agave because it is higher in fructose and much sweeter compared to the rest. It is therefore the primary source for agave syrup, a nectary sweetener made for consumption.

== Ecology ==
Agave species are used as food plants by the larvae of some Lepidoptera (butterfly and moth) species, including Batrachedra striolata, which has been recorded on A. shawii.

== Toxicity ==
Some species contain components in their juice which can cause dermatitis for some people.

== Uses ==
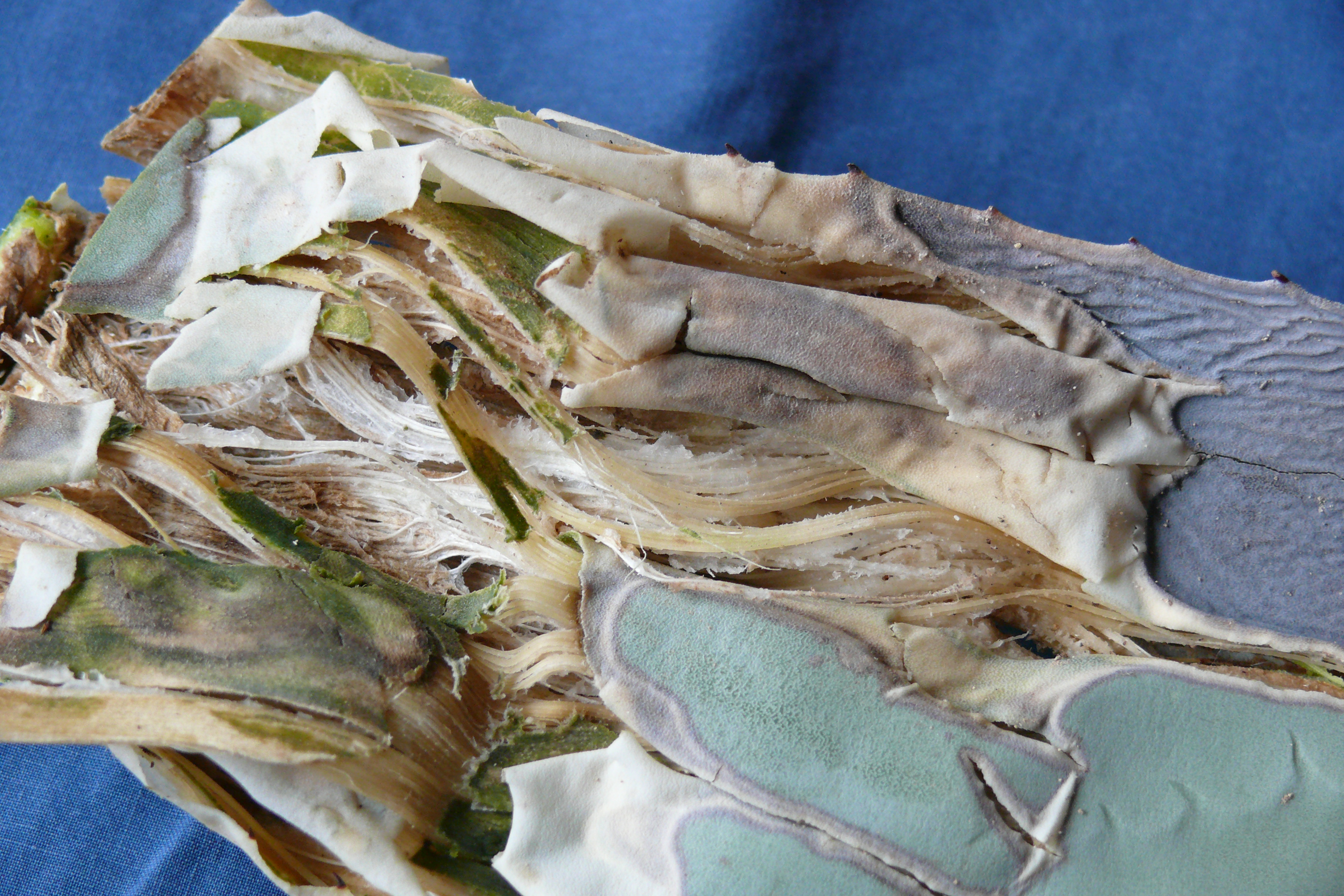
Fibers inside a huachuca agave leaf (Agave parryi)

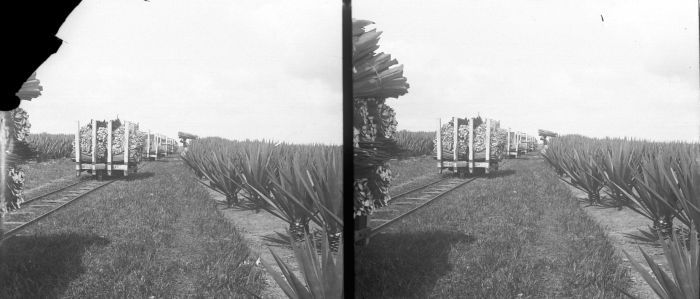
Agave harvesting in Java, 1917

The ethnobotany of the agave was described by William H. Prescott in 1843:

But the miracle of nature was the great Mexican aloe, or maguey, whose clustering pyramids of flowers, towering above their dark coronals of leaves, were seen sprinkled over many a broad acre of the table-land. As we have already noticed its bruised leaves afforded a paste from which paper was manufactured, its juice was fermented into an intoxicating beverage, pulque, of which the natives, to this day, are extremely fond; its leaves further supplied an impenetrable thatch for the more humble dwellings; thread, of which coarse stuffs were made, and strong cords, were drawn from its tough and twisted fibers; pins and needles were made from the thorns at the extremity of its leaves; and the root, when properly cooked, was converted into a palatable and nutritious food. The agave, in short, was meat, drink, clothing, and writing materials for the Aztec! Surely, never did Nature enclose in so compact a form so many of the elements of human comfort and civilization!

The four major edible parts of the agave are the flowers, the leaves, the stalks or basal rosettes, and the sap (in Spanish: aguamiel, meaning "honey water"). The sap of some species can also be used as soap.

=== Food and fiber ===
Each agave plant produces several pounds of edible flowers during its final season. The stalks, which are ready during the summer, before the blossom, weigh several pounds each. Roasted, they are sweet and can be chewed to extract the sap or aguamiel, like sugarcane. When dried out, the stalks can be used to make didgeridoos. The leaves may be collected in winter and spring, when the plants are rich in sap, for eating. The leaves of several species also yield fiber, for instance, A. sisalana, the sisal hemp, and A. decipiens, the false sisal hemp. A. americana is the source of pita fiber, and is used as a fiber plant in Mexico, the West Indies, and southern Europe.

The agave, especially A. murpheyi, was a major food source for the prehistoric indigenous people of the Southwestern United States. The Hohokam of southern Arizona cultivated large areas of agave. In southern California and the Baja California Peninsula, the roasted hearts of A. shawii and A. deserti were historically among the most important foods for the Cahuilla, Kumeyaay, Kiliwa, and Paipai peoples, leaving ubiquitous archeological evidence in the form of agave-roasting pits throughout the region.

The Navajo similarly found many uses for the agave plant. A beverage is squeezed from the baked fibers, and the heads can be baked or boiled, pounded into flat sheets, sun dried, and stored for future use. The baked, dried heads are also boiled and made into an edible paste, eaten whole, or made into soup. The leaves are eaten boiled, and the young, tender flowering stalks and shoots are roasted and eaten as well. The fibers are used to make rope, the leaves are used to line baking pits, and the sharp-pointed leaf tips are used to make basketry awls.

During the development of the inflorescence, sap rushes to the base of the young flower stalk. Agave syrup (commonly called agave nectar), a sweetener derived from the sap, is used as an alternative to sugar in cooking, and can be added to breakfast cereals as a binding agent. Extracts from agave leaves are under preliminary research for their potential use as food additives.

=== Beverages and tequila ===
The sap of A. americana and other species is used in Mexico and Mesoamerica to produce pulque, an alcoholic beverage. The flower shoot is cut out and the sap collected and subsequently fermented. By distillation, a spirit called mezcal is prepared; one of the best-known forms of mezcal is tequila. A. tequilana or A. tequilana var. azul is used in the production of tequila. A. angustifolia is widely used in the production of mezcal and pulque, though at least 10 other Agave species are also known to be used for this.

=== Research ===
Agave can be used as the raw material for industrial production of fructans as a prebiotic dietary fiber. Agave contains fructooligosaccharides, which are naturally occurring oligosaccharides that support safely subjecting peanut-allergic people to allergen immunotherapy. Resulting from its natural habitat in stressful environments, agave is under preliminary research for its potential use in germplasm conservation and in biotechnology to better anticipate the economic effects of global climate change. It may also have use as a bioethanol or bioenergy feedstock. Agave plantations have potential applications on marginal lands unsuitable for grain crops.

== Gallery of species and cultivars ==
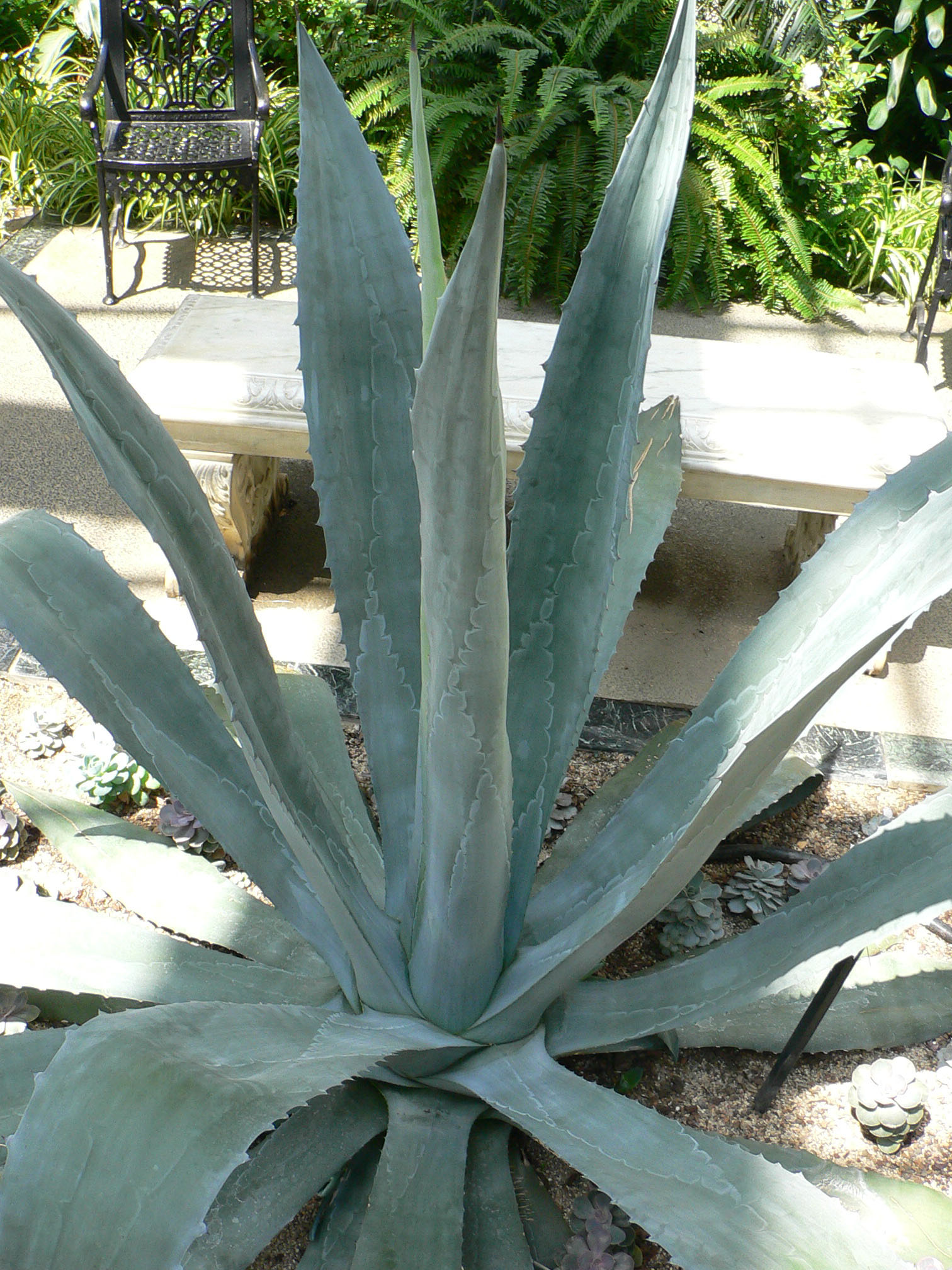
Agave americana var. americana

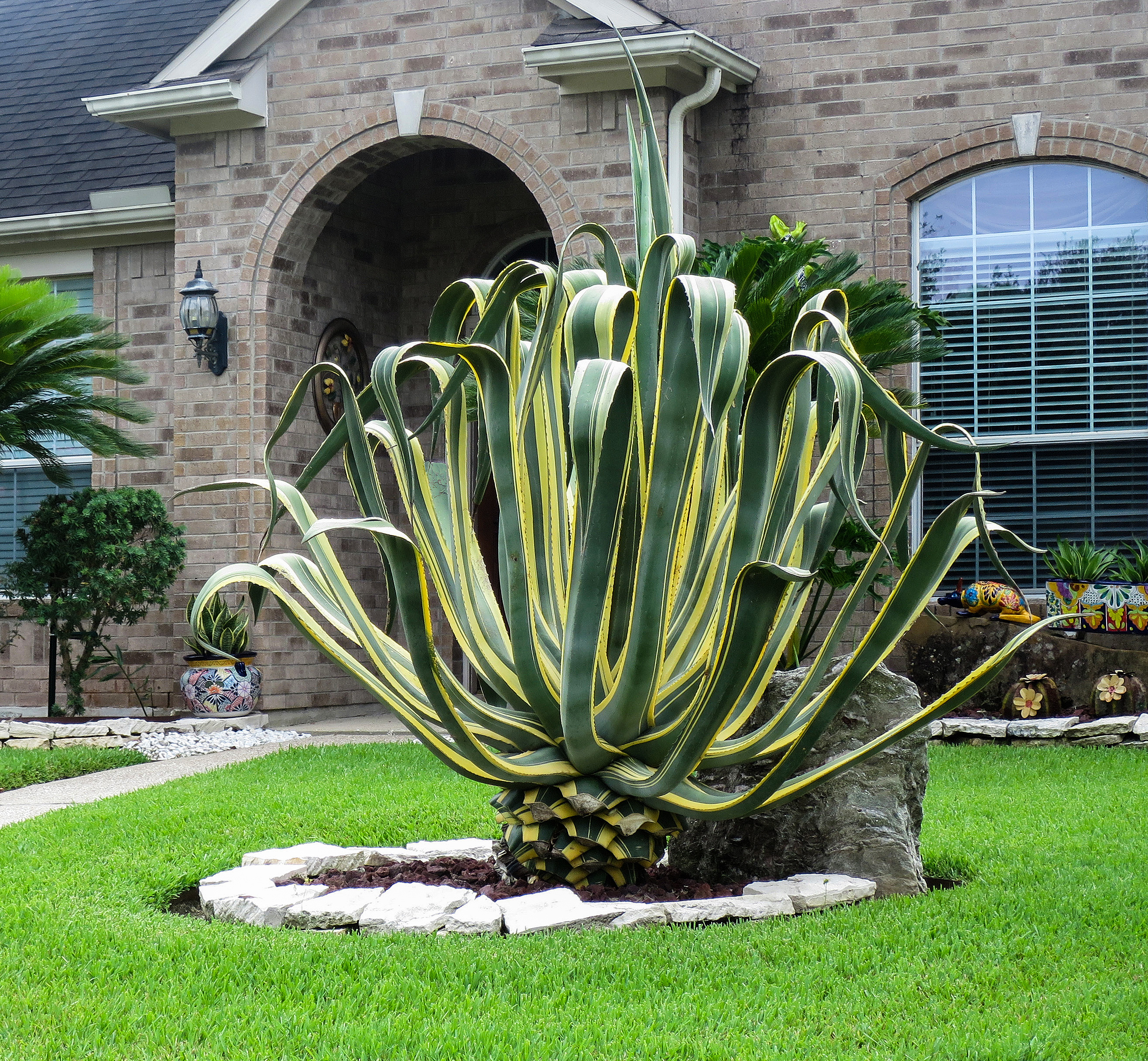
Variegated Century Plant -- Agave americana 'Marginata'

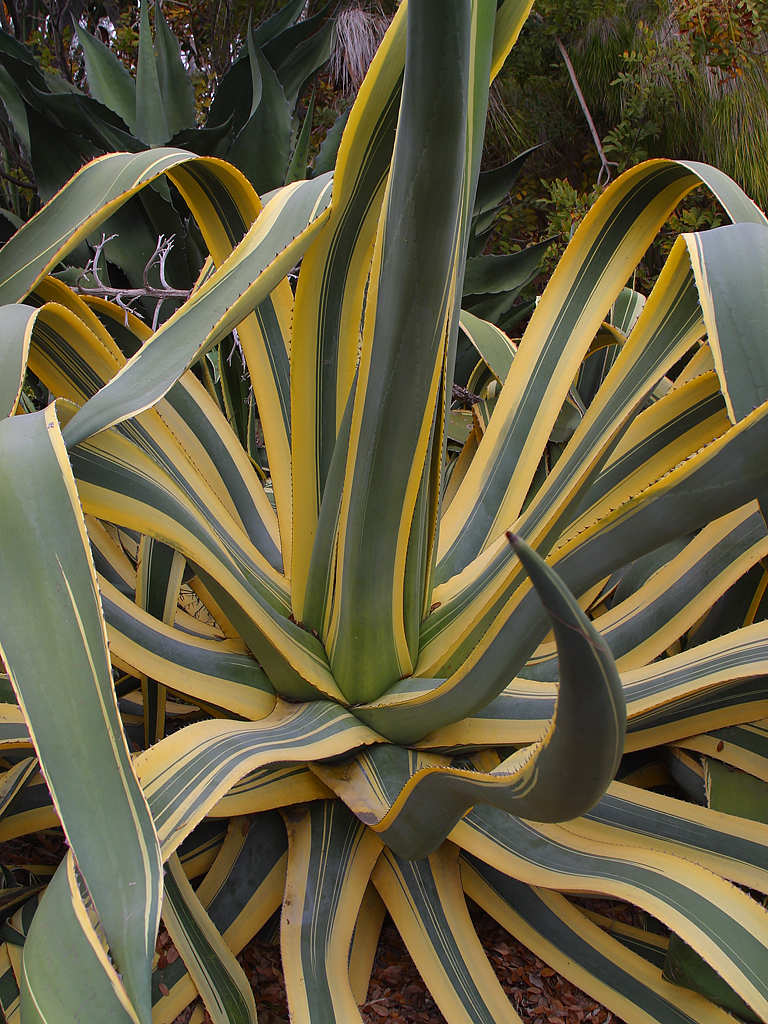
Agave americana 'Marginata'

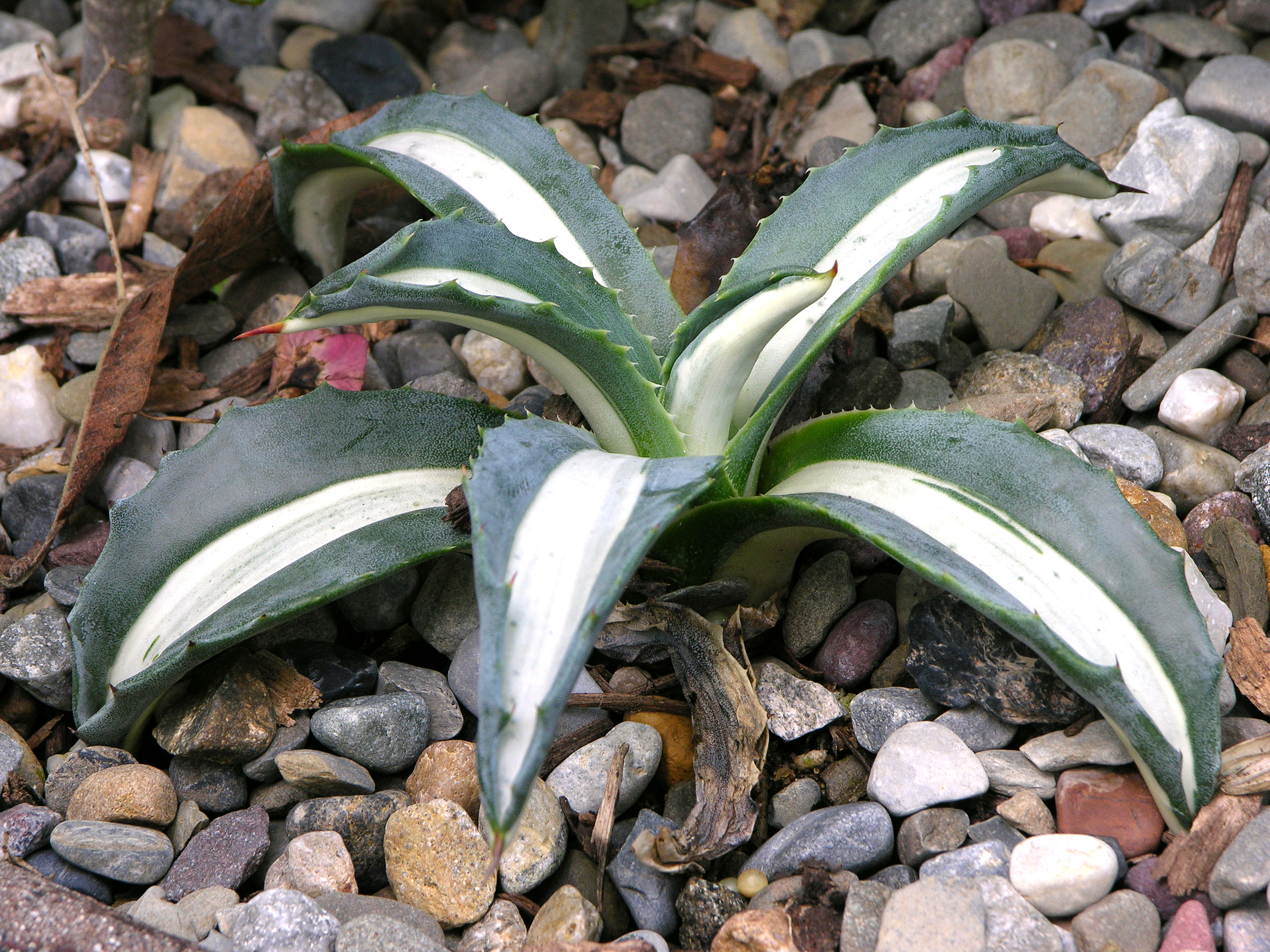
Agave americana cv. 'Mediopicta Alba'

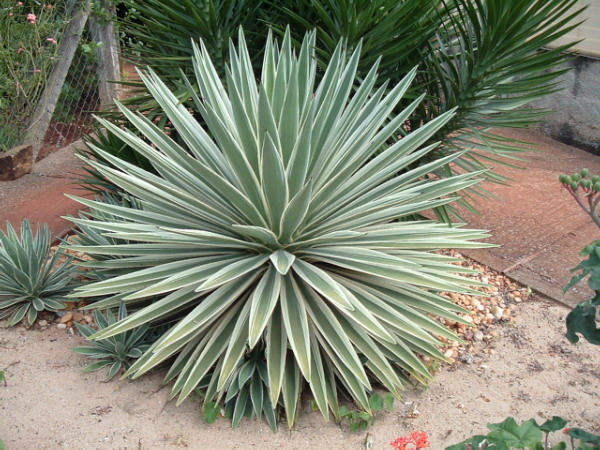
Agave angustifolia 'Marginata'

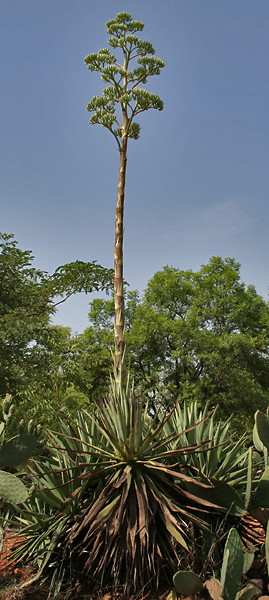
Agave angustifolia (flowering)

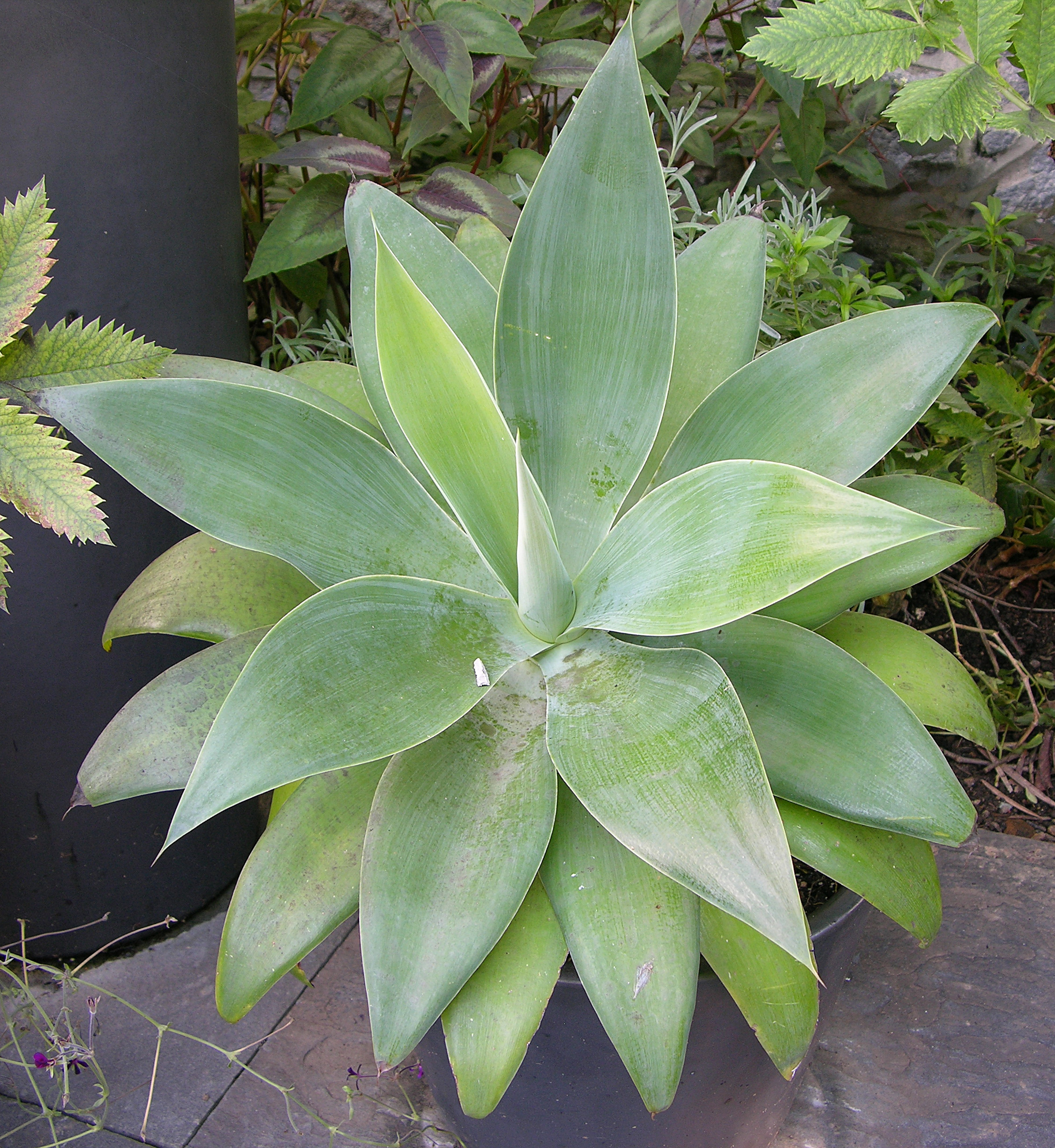
Agave attenuata

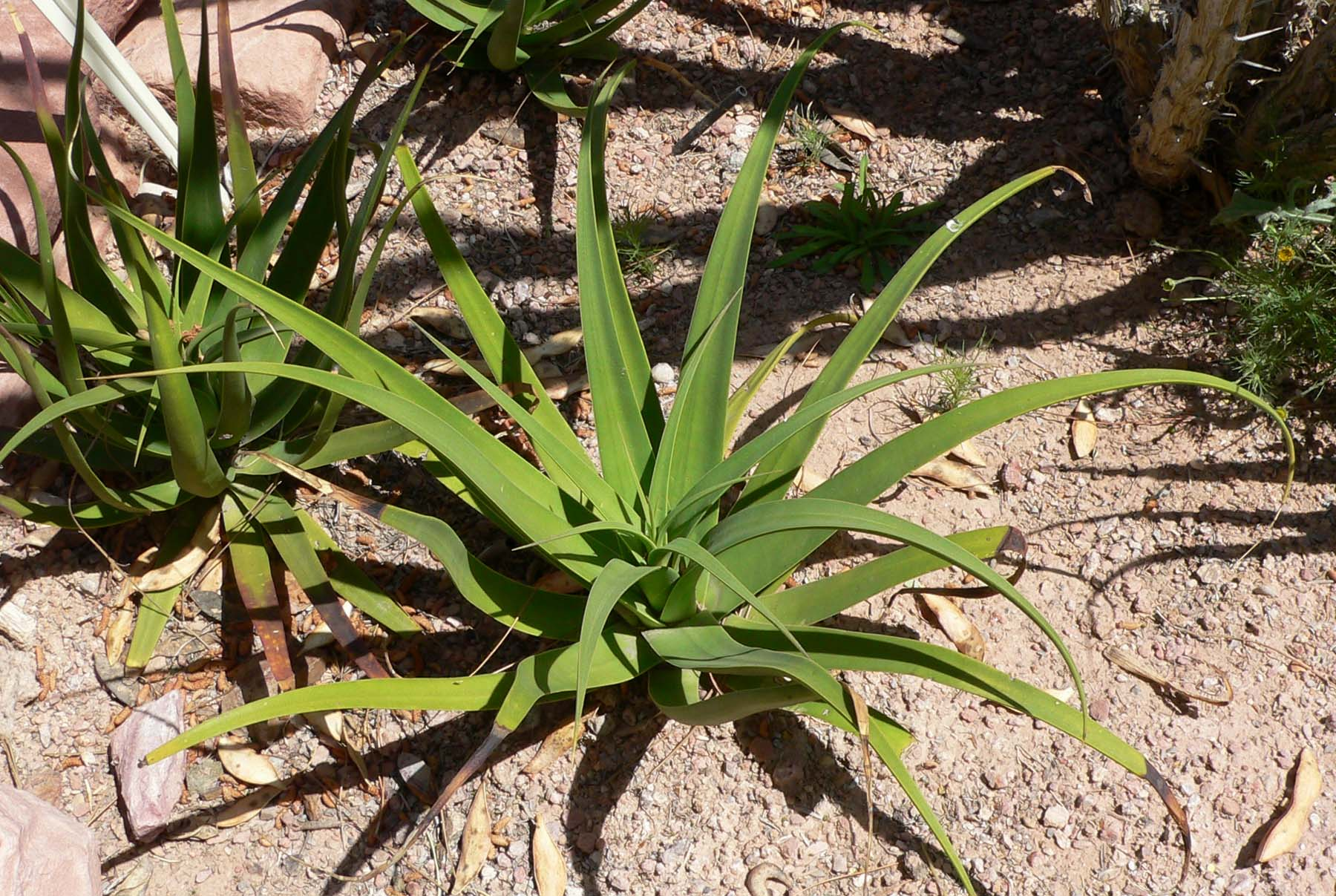
Agave bracteosa (spider agave)

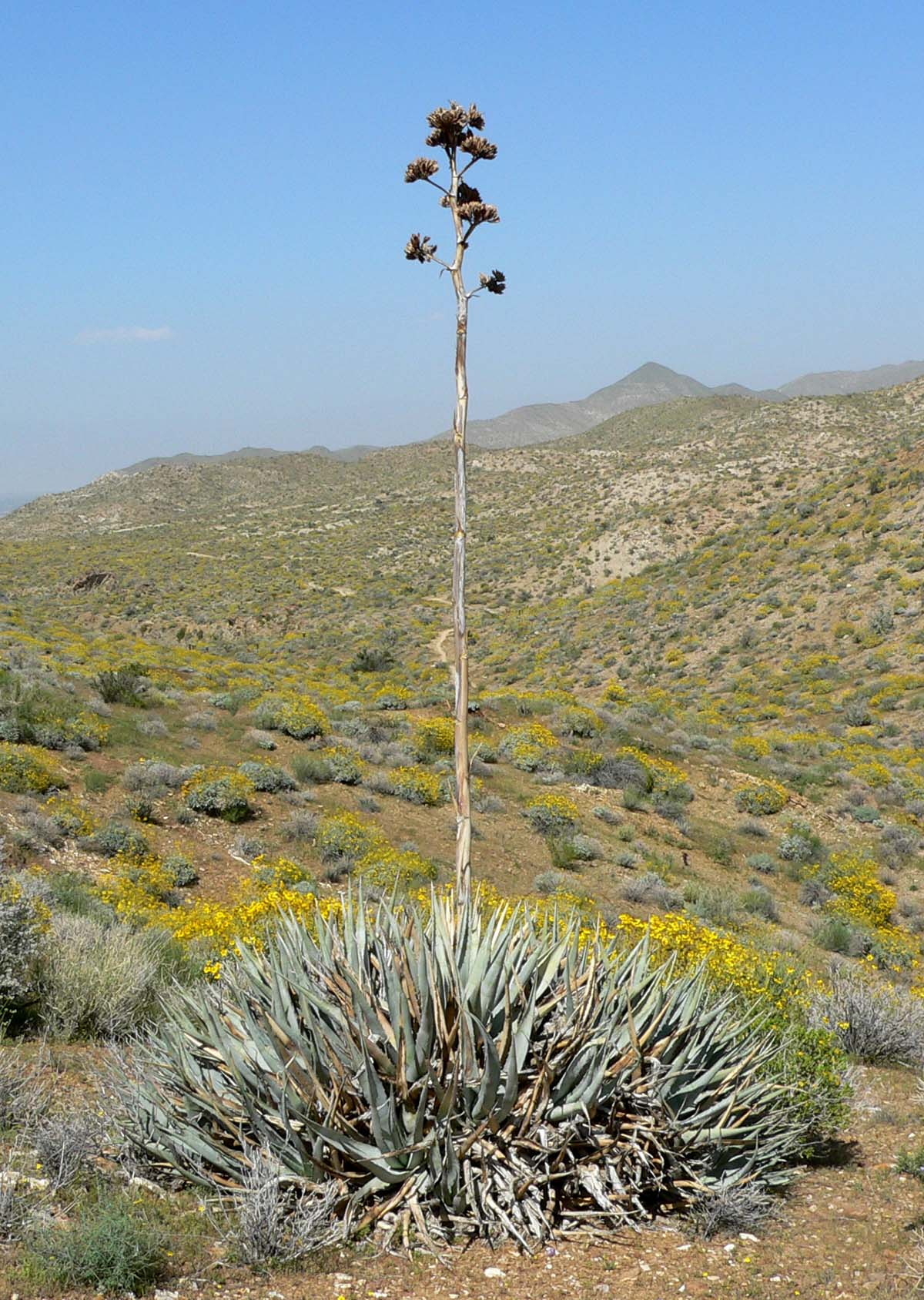
Agave deserti

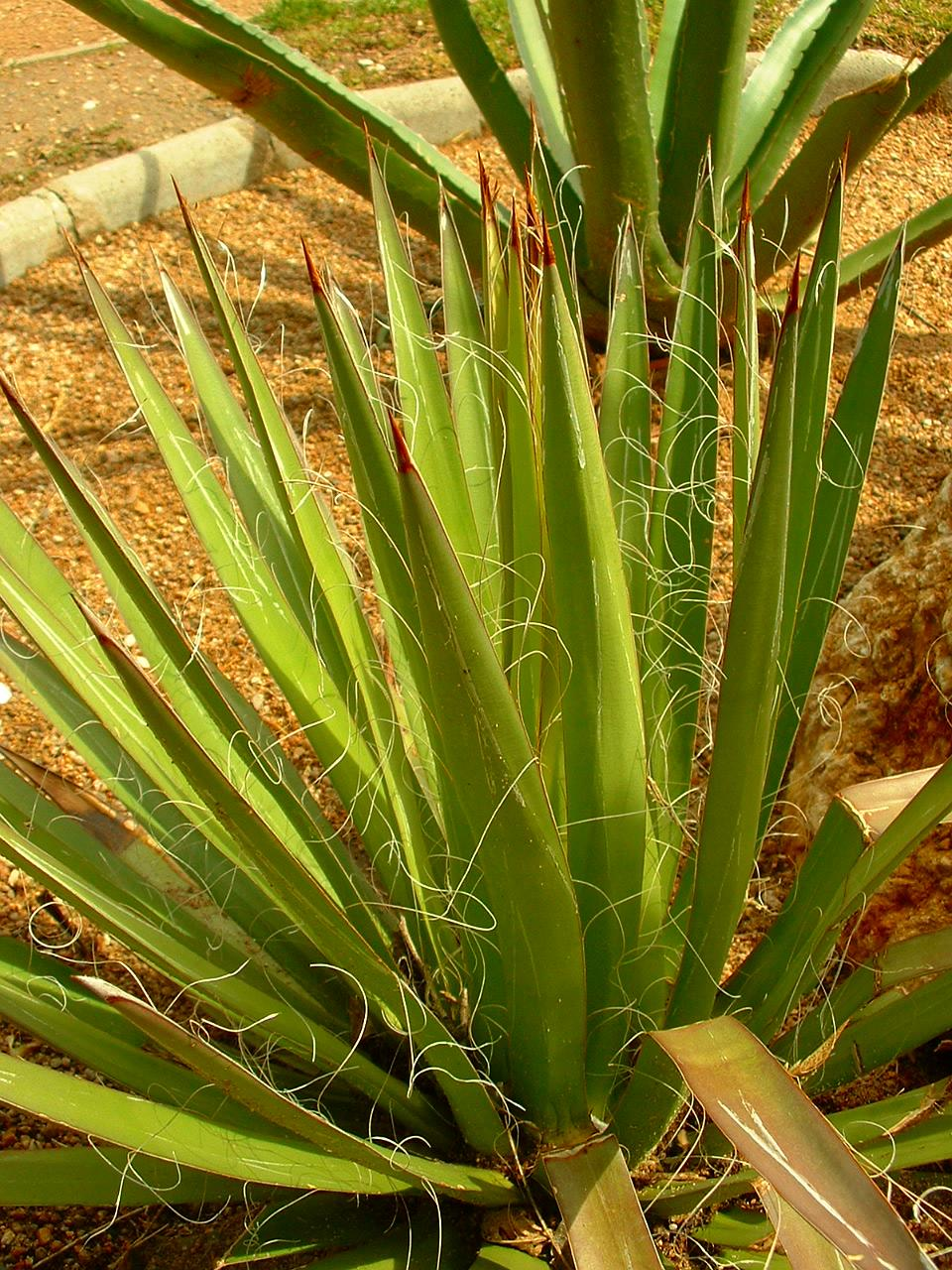
Agave filifera

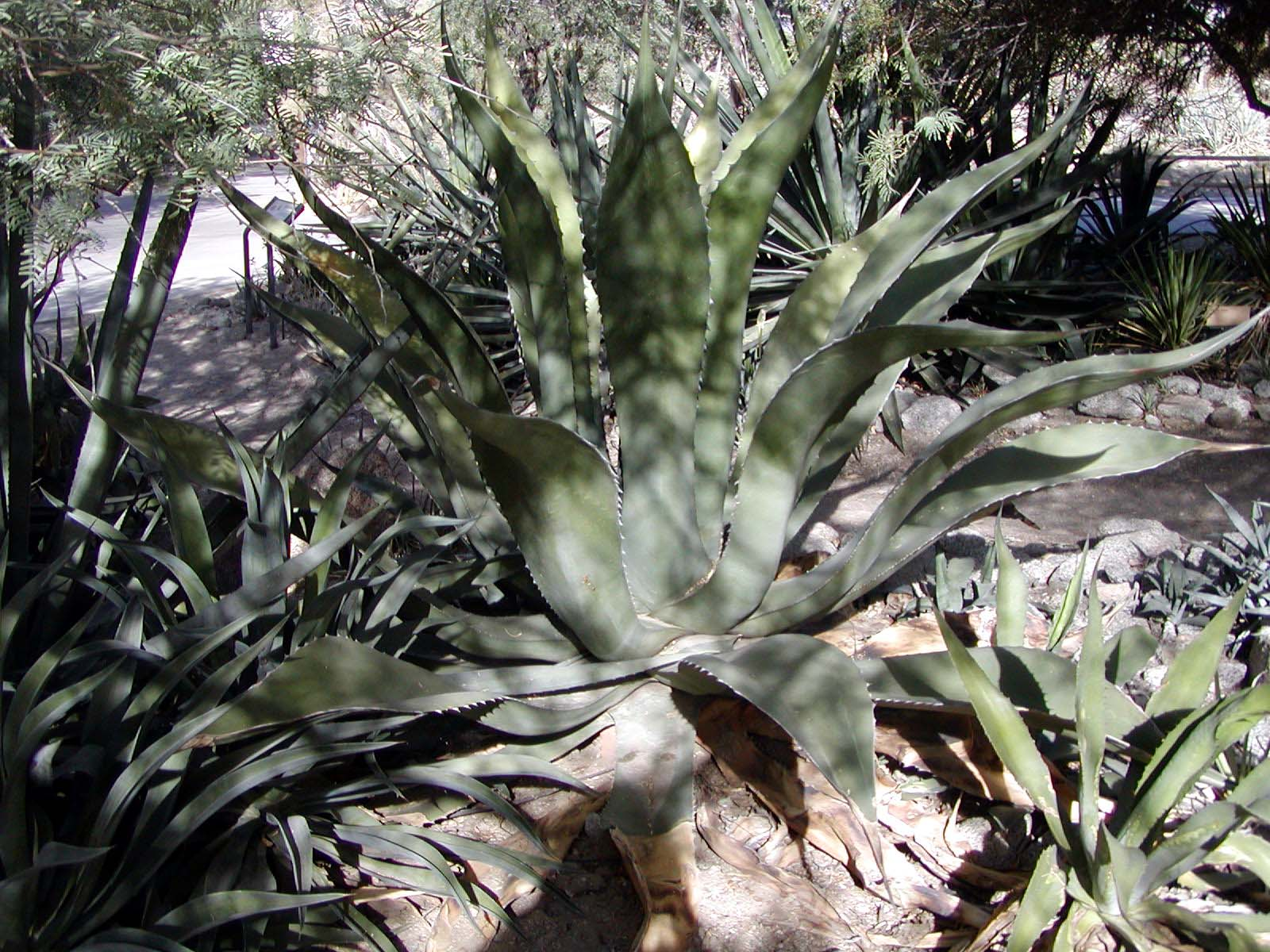
Agave inaequidens ssp. barrancensis

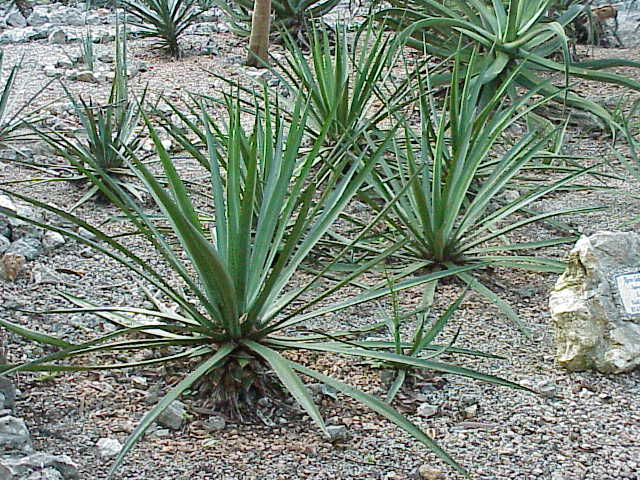
Agave lechuguilla

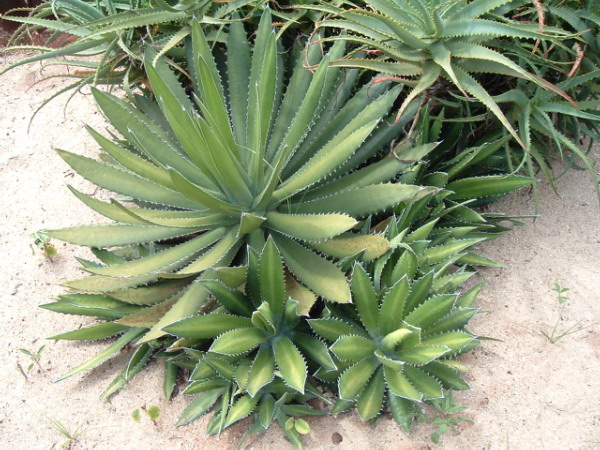
Agave lophantha

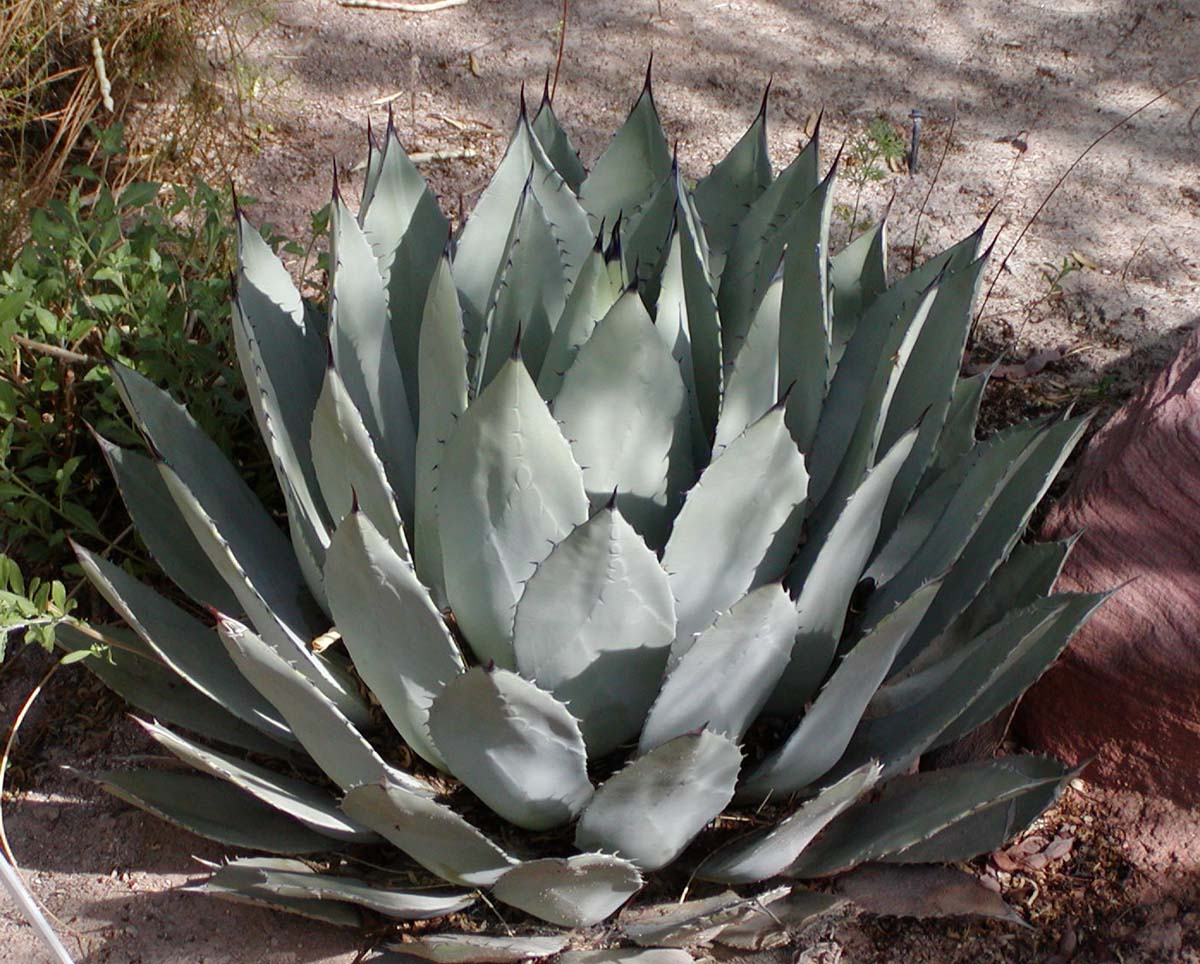
Agave palmeri

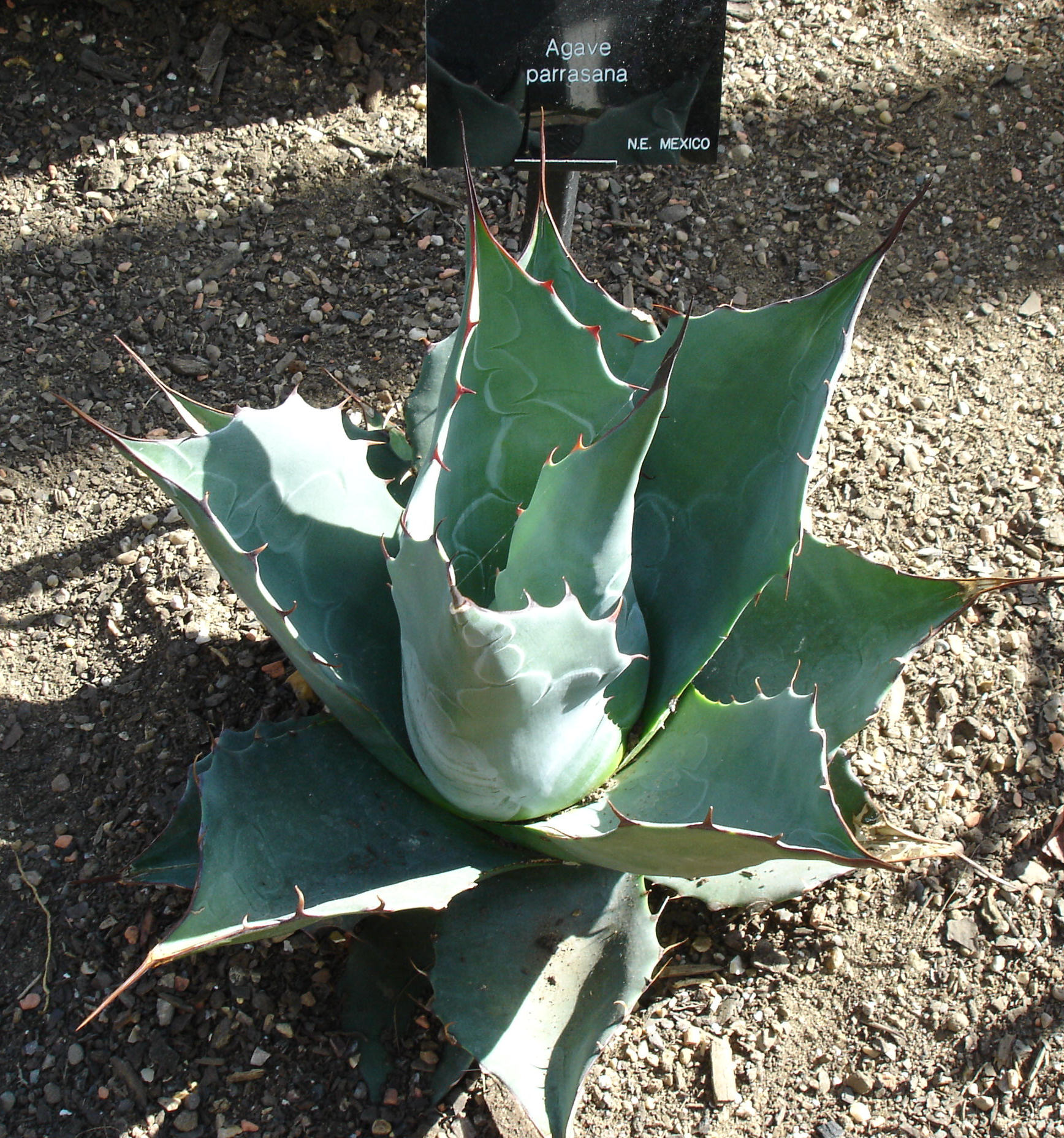
Agave parrasana (syn. Agave wislizeni subsp. parrasana)

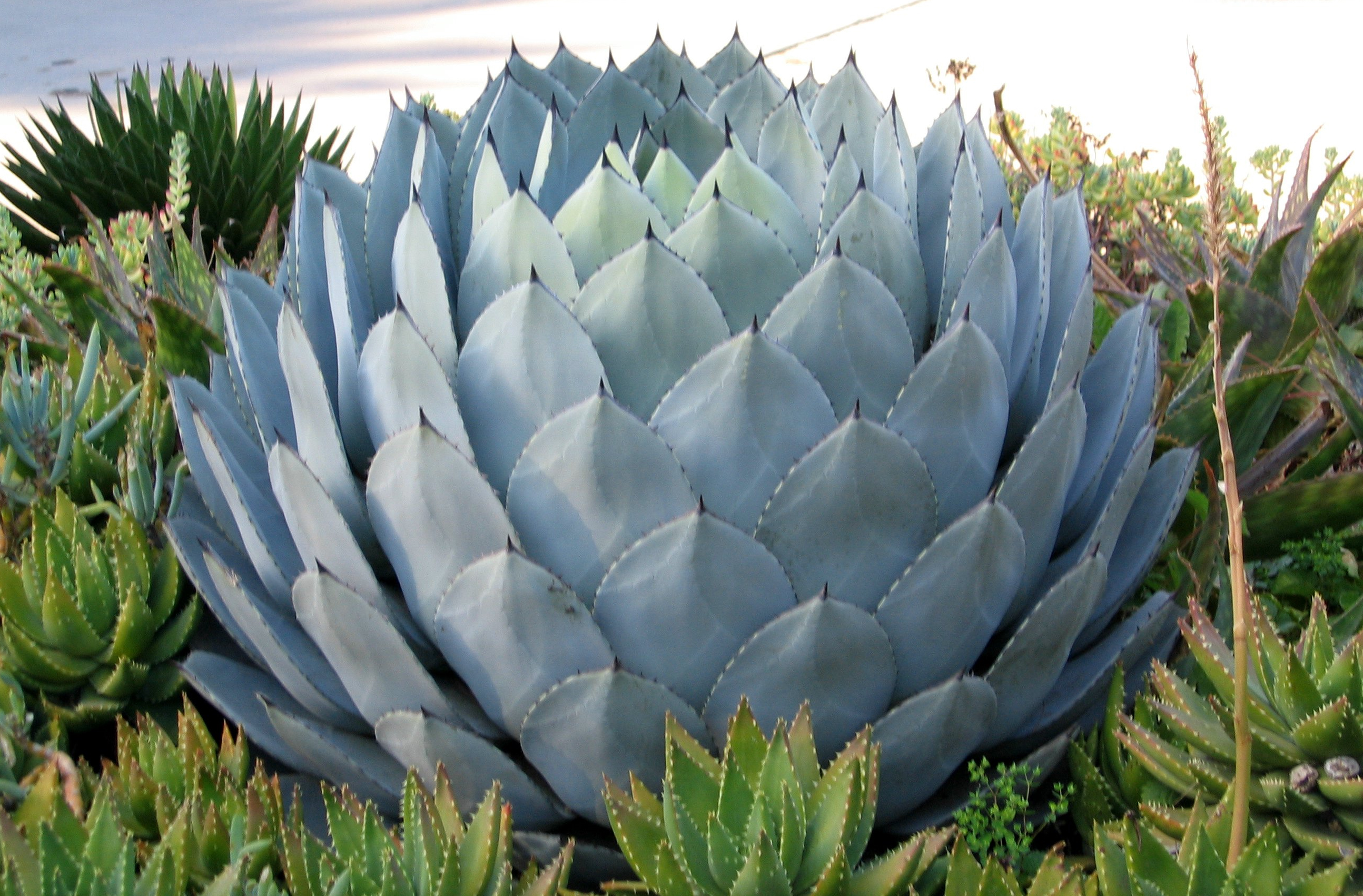
Agave parryi

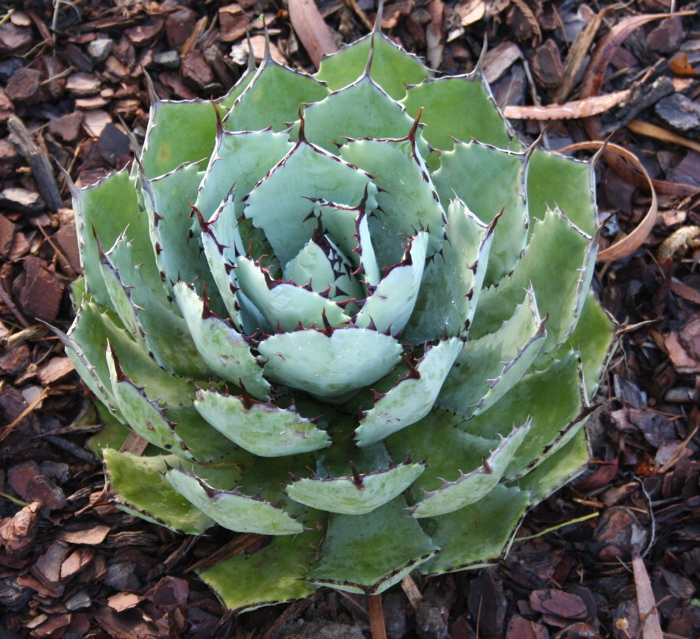
Agave potatorum cv. 'Kichiokan'

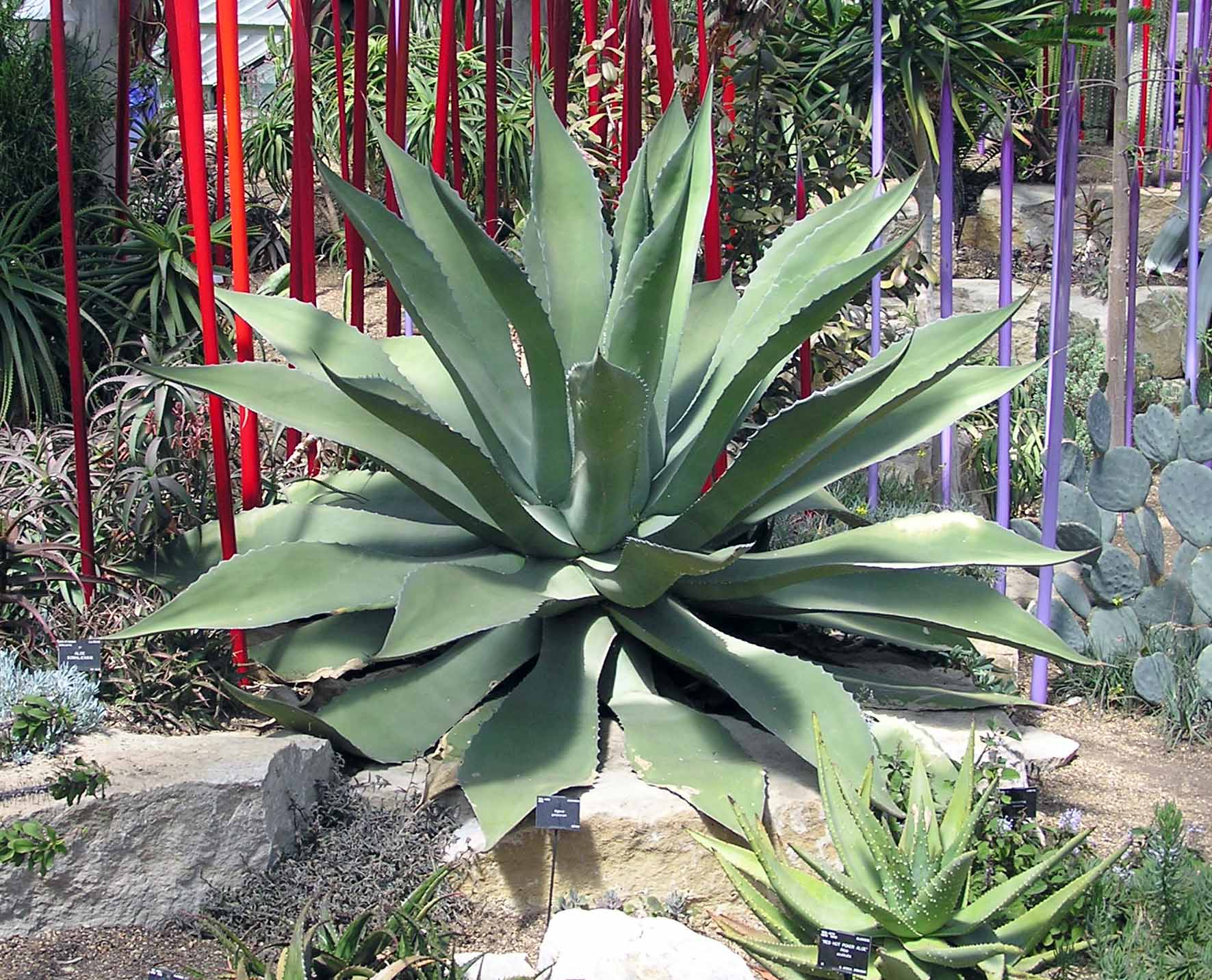
Agave salmiana

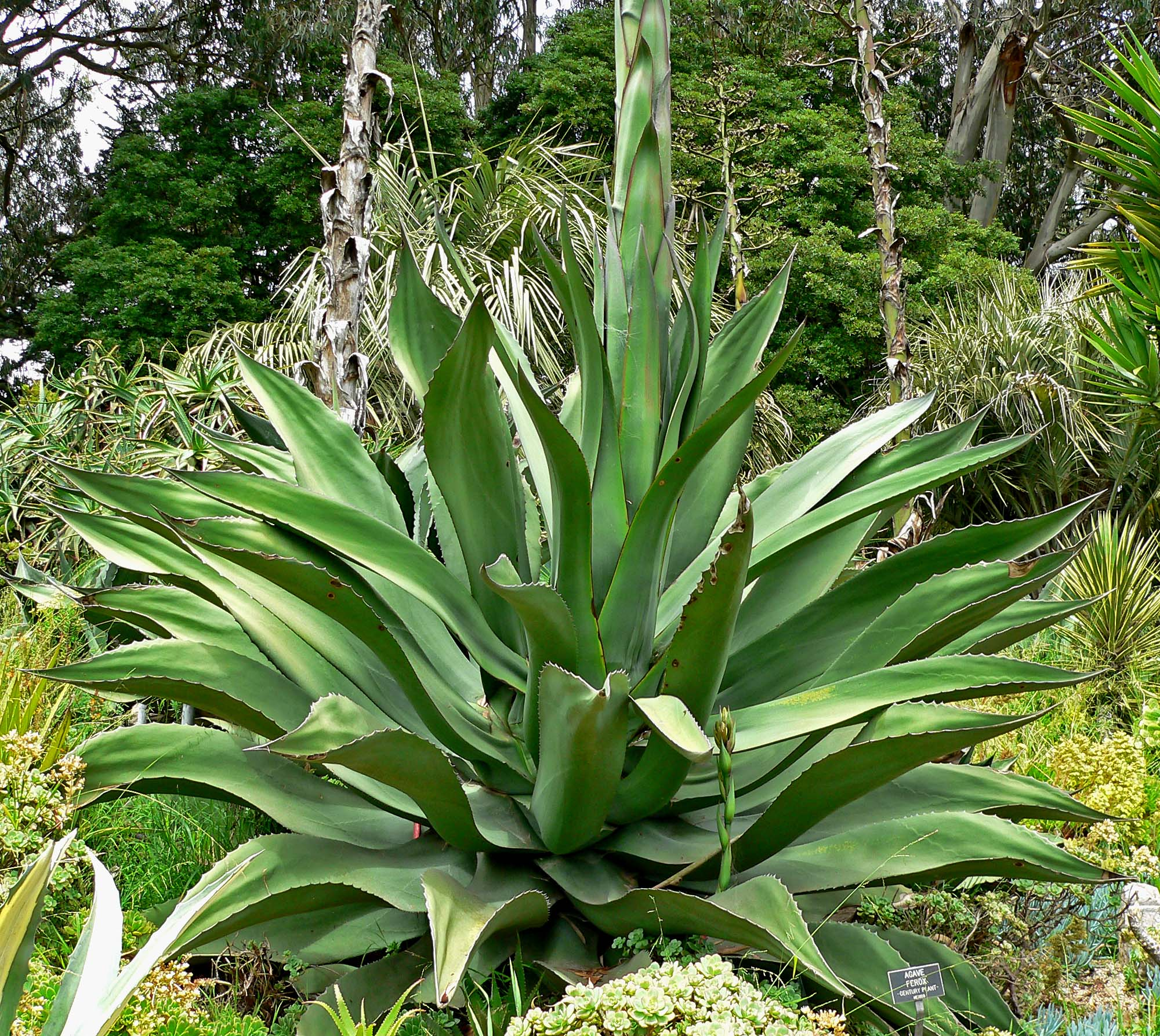
Agave salmiana var. ferox

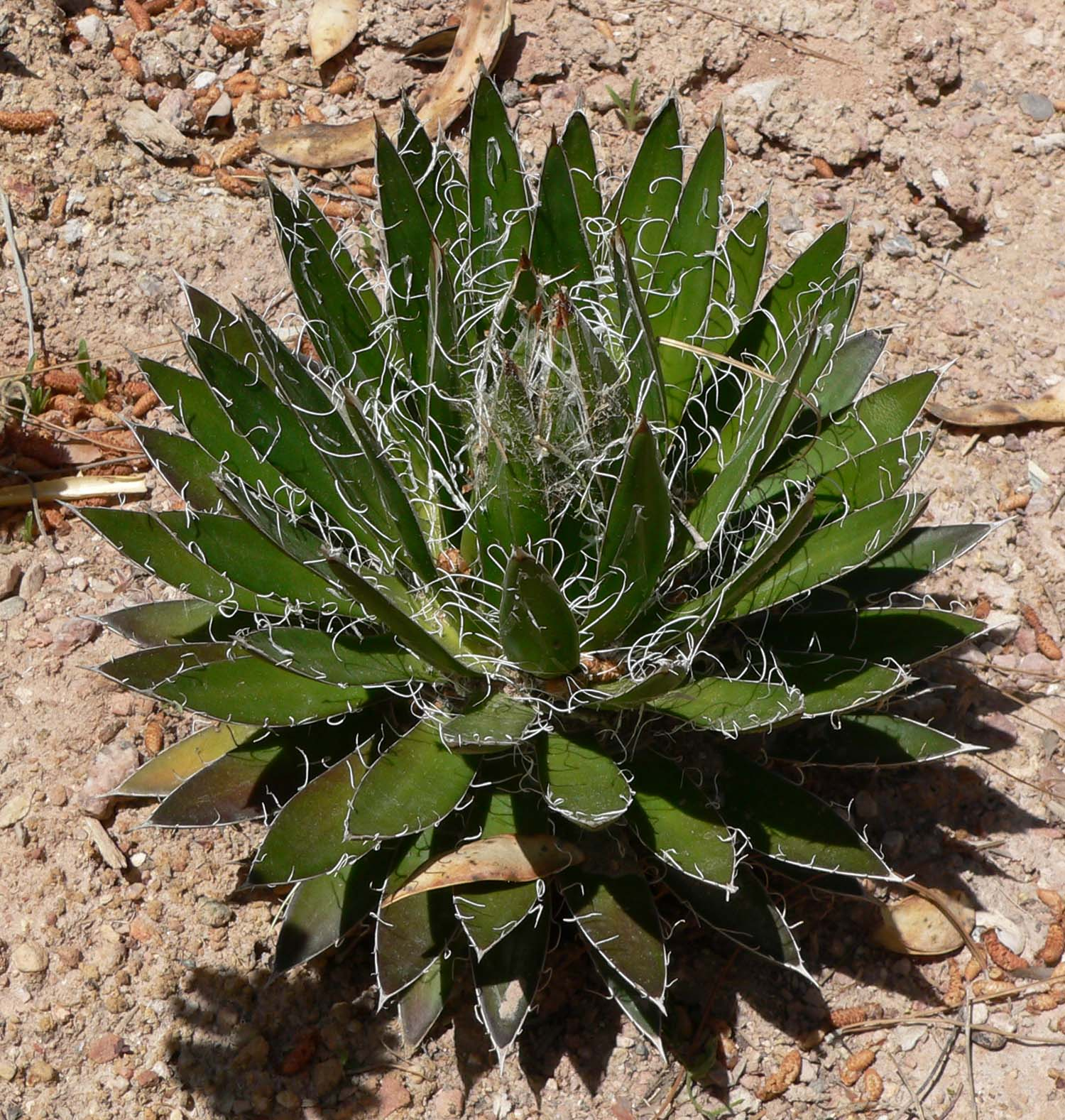
Agave schidigera cv. 'Durango Delight'

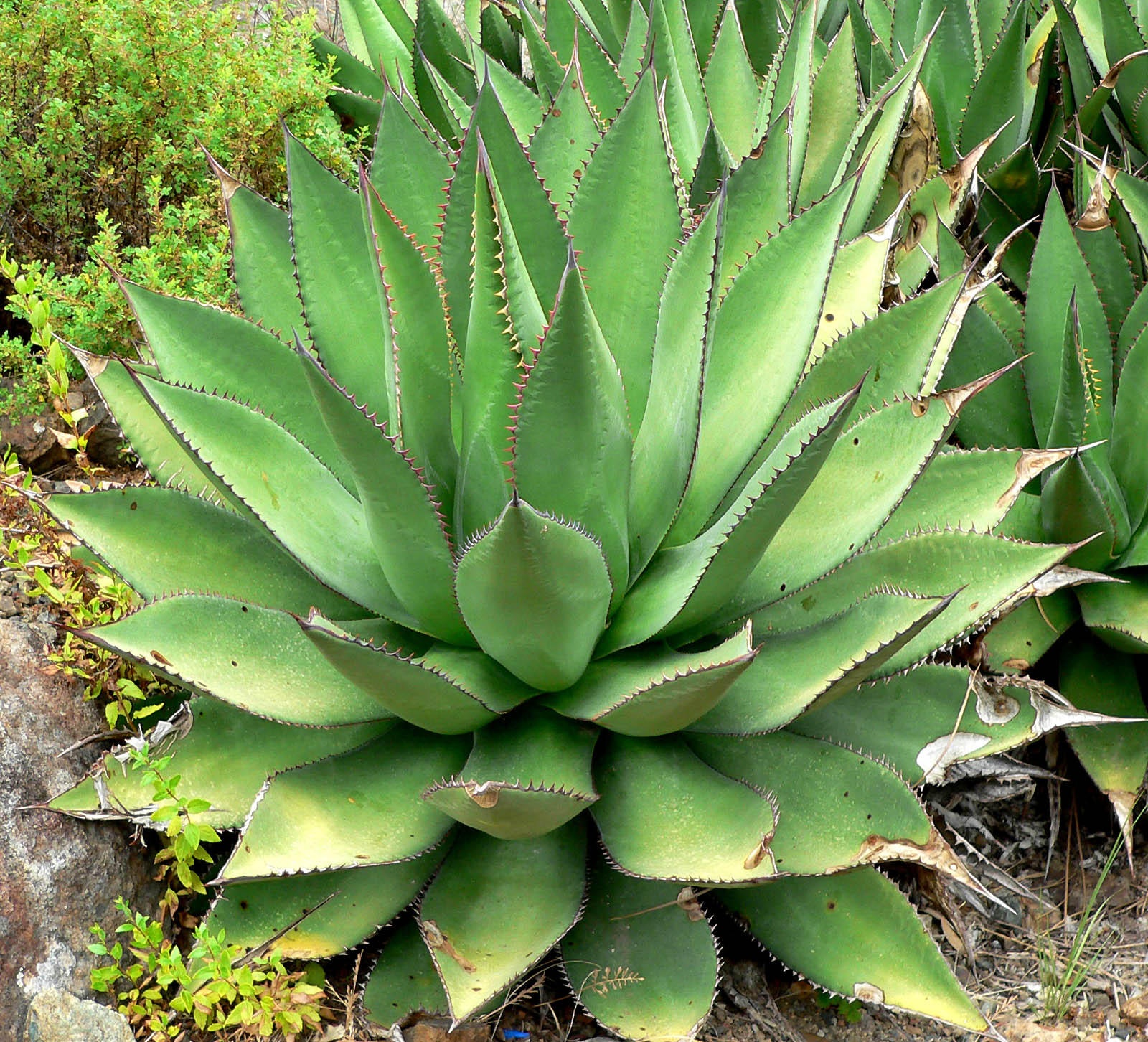
Agave shawii

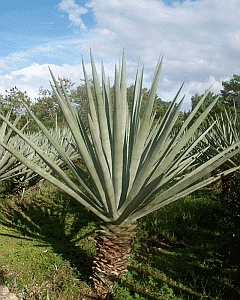
Agave sisalana (sisal)

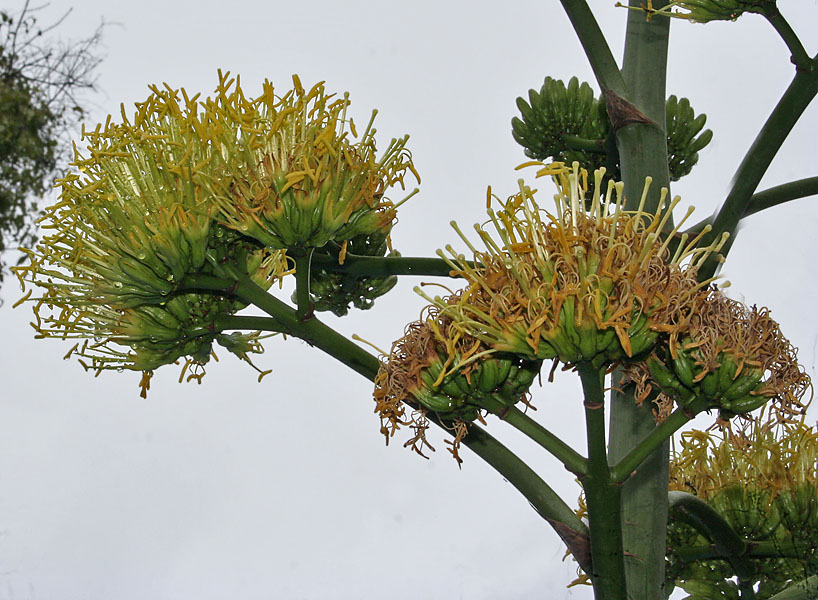
Agave sisalana (flowers)

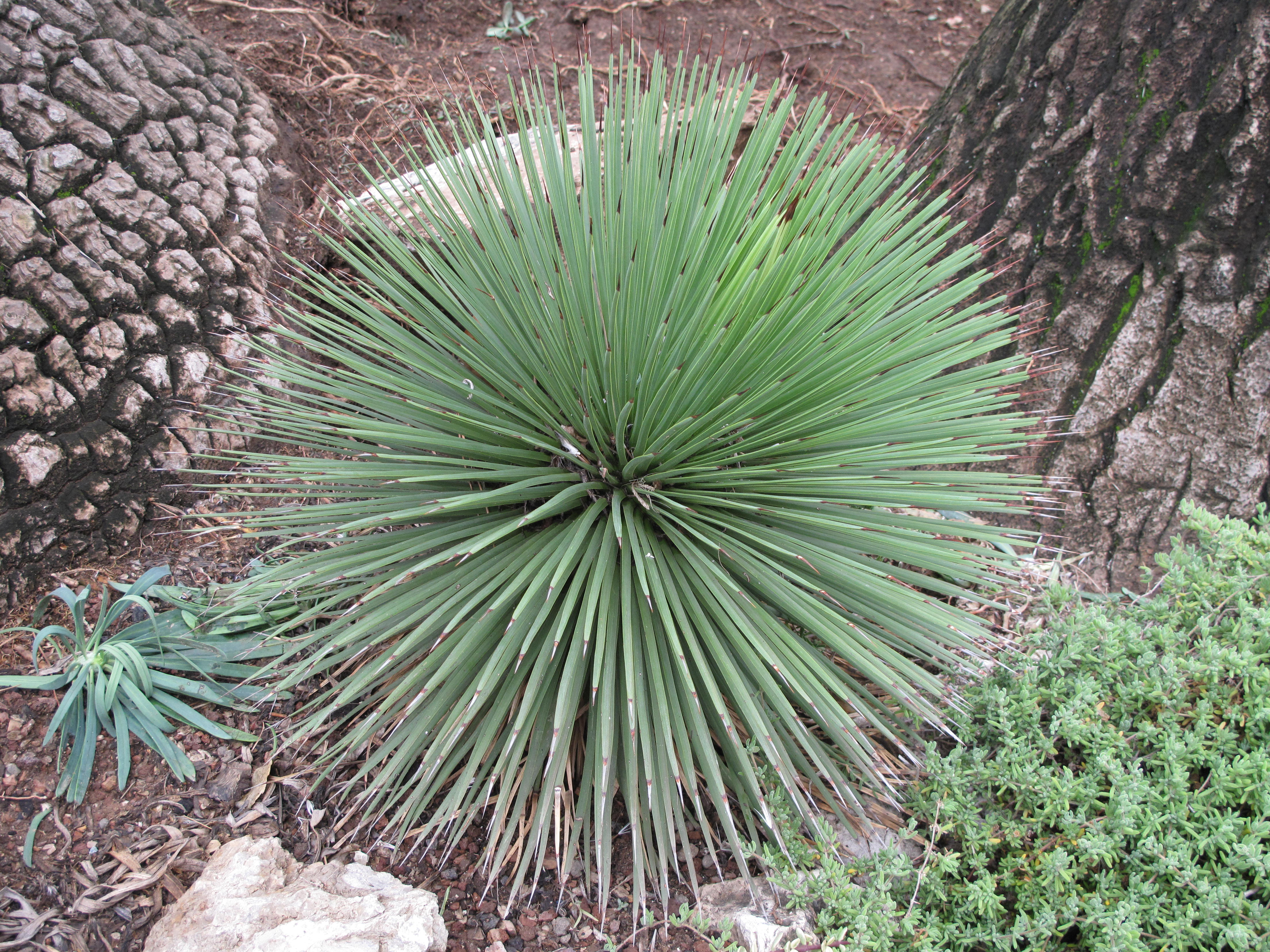
Agave stricta

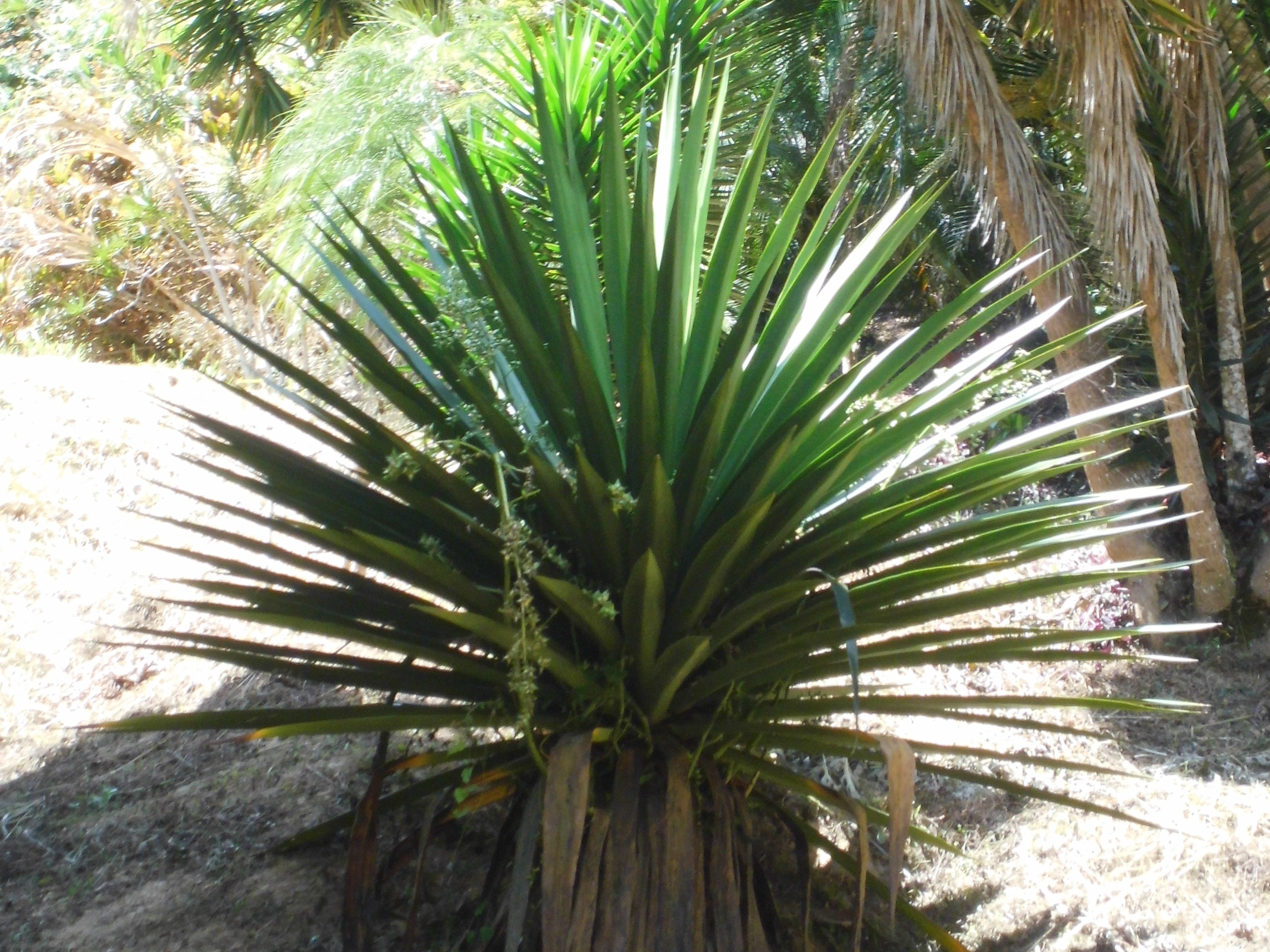
Agave tequilana

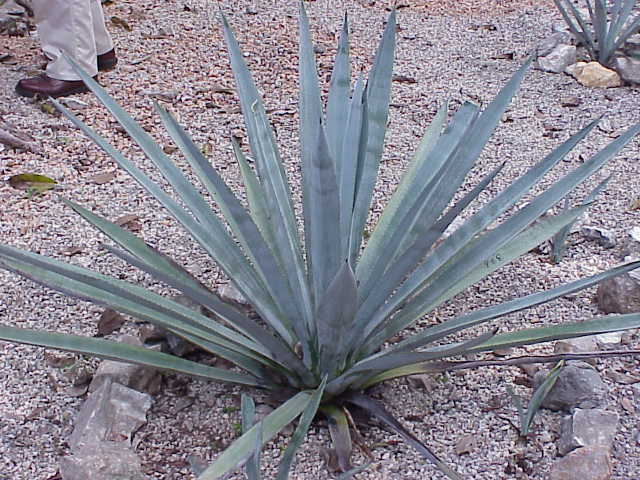
Agave tequilana 'Weber's Azul' (tequila agave)

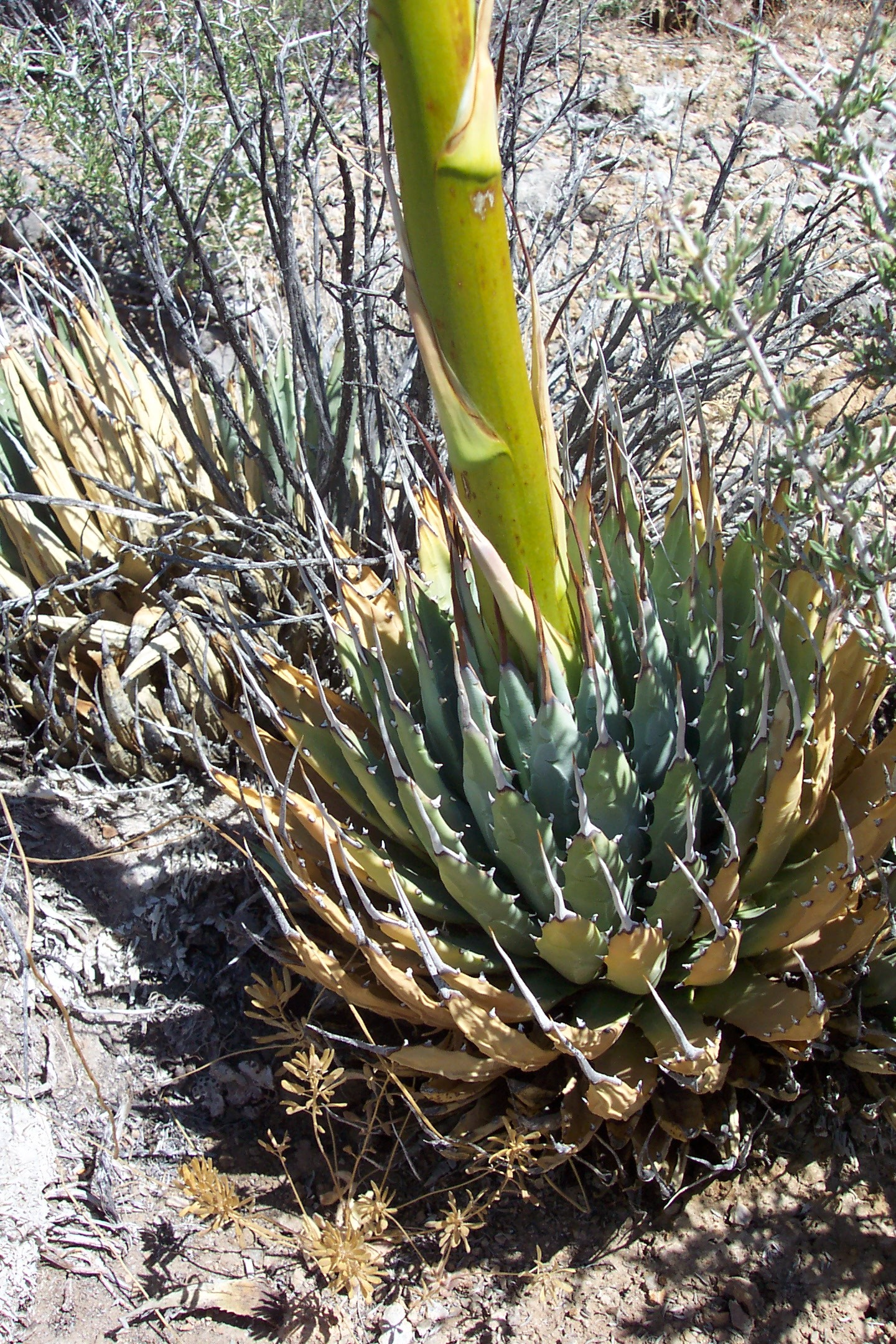
Agave utahensis

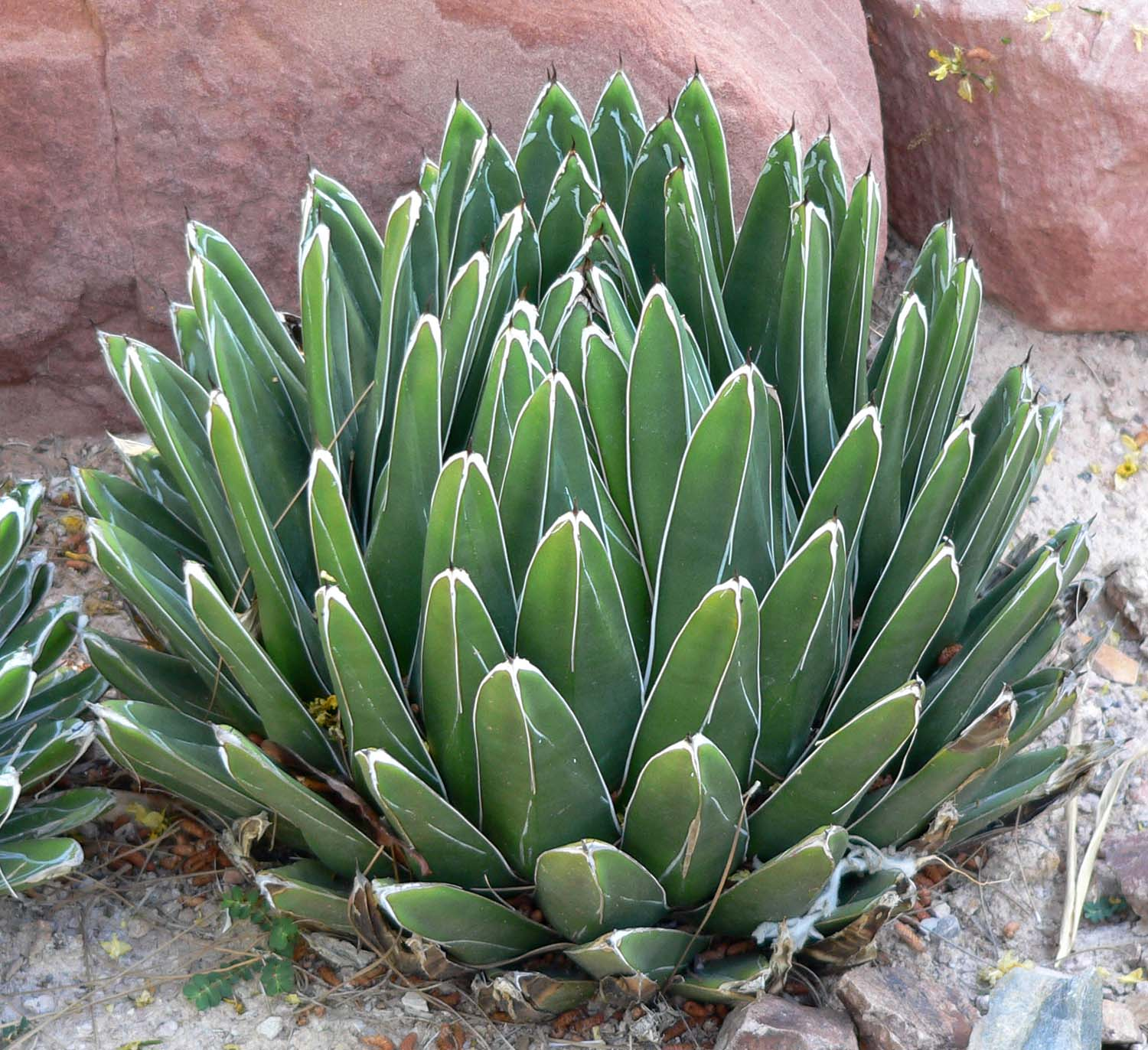
Agave victoriae-reginae

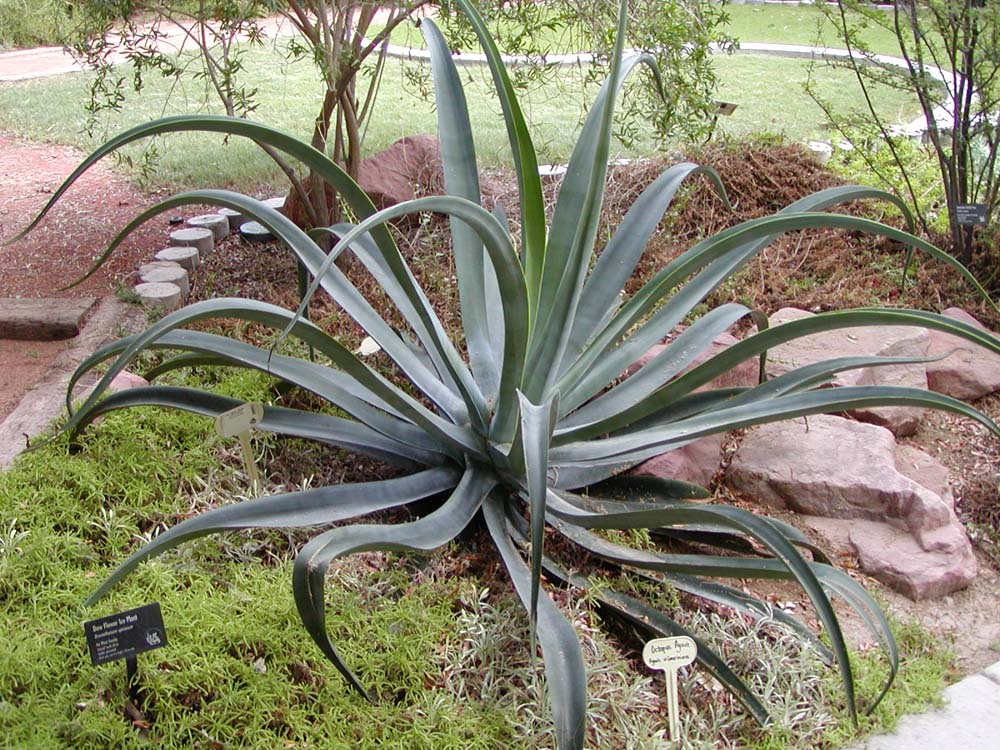
Agave vilmoriniana

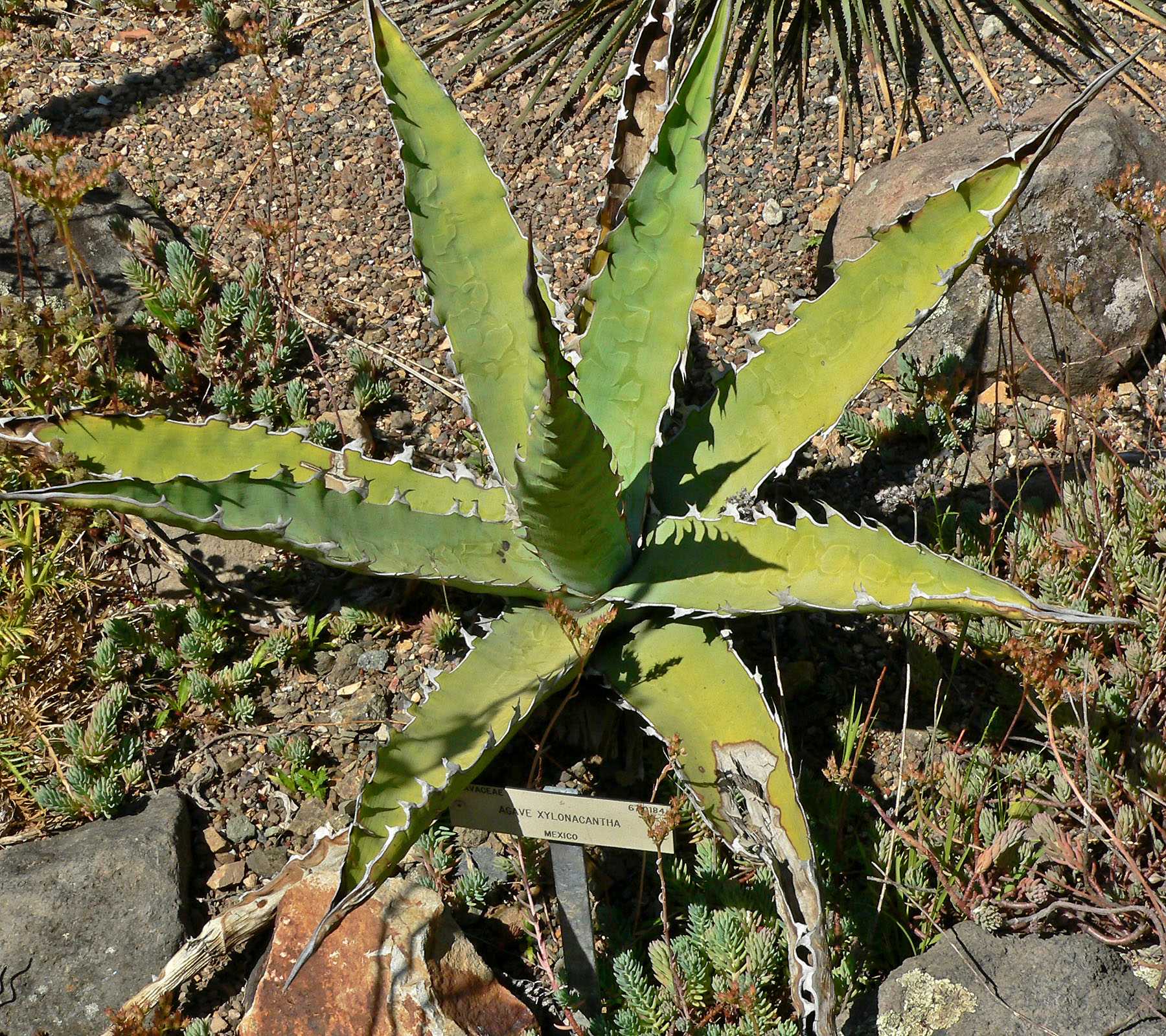
Agave xylonacantha

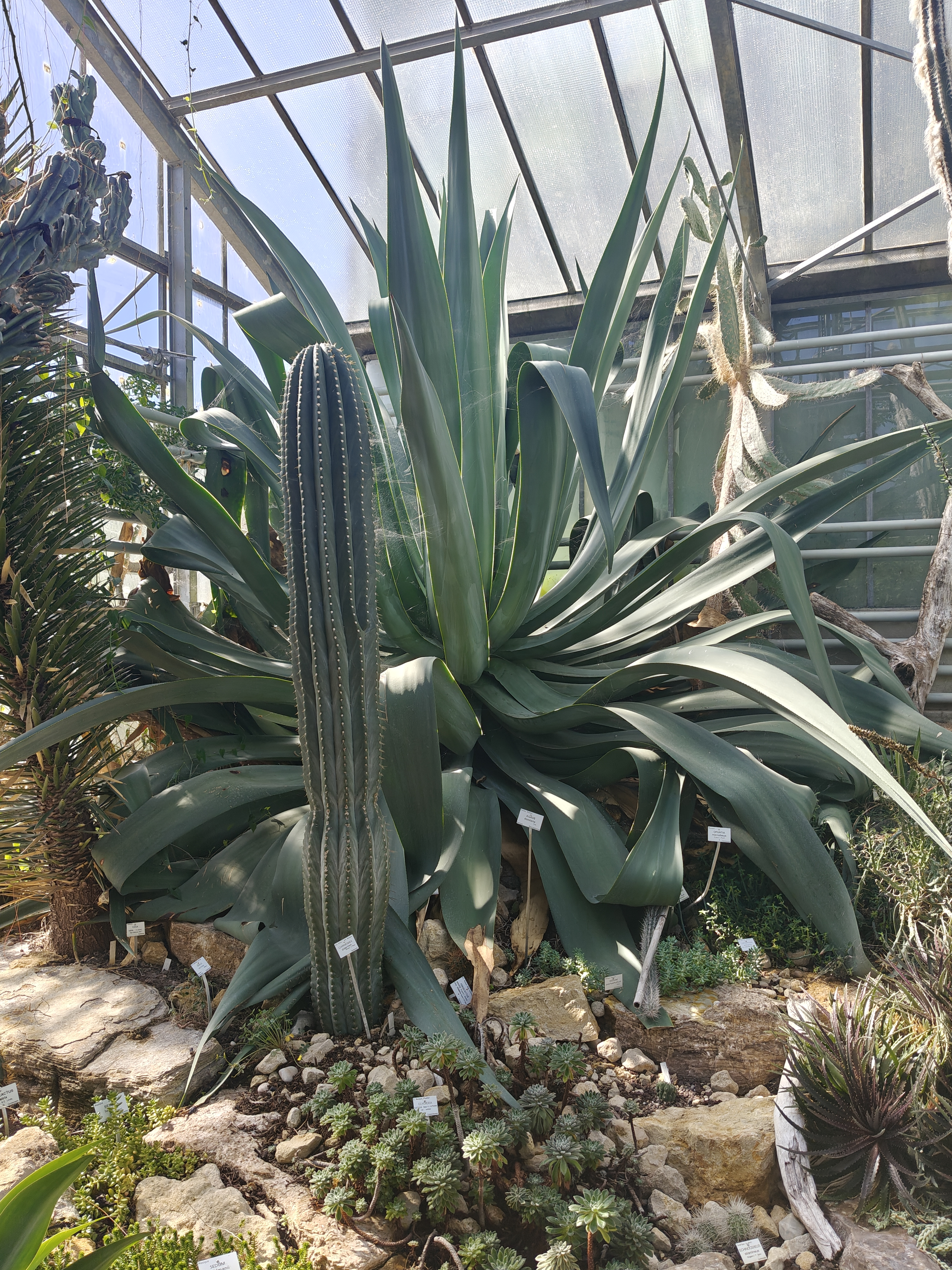
Agave dussiana

== See also ==
Accepted genera (POWO), but considered synonyms by some authorities:

- Manfreda
- Mangave (an artificial hybrid)
- Polianthes (synonym Bravoa Lex.)
- Prochnyanthes
