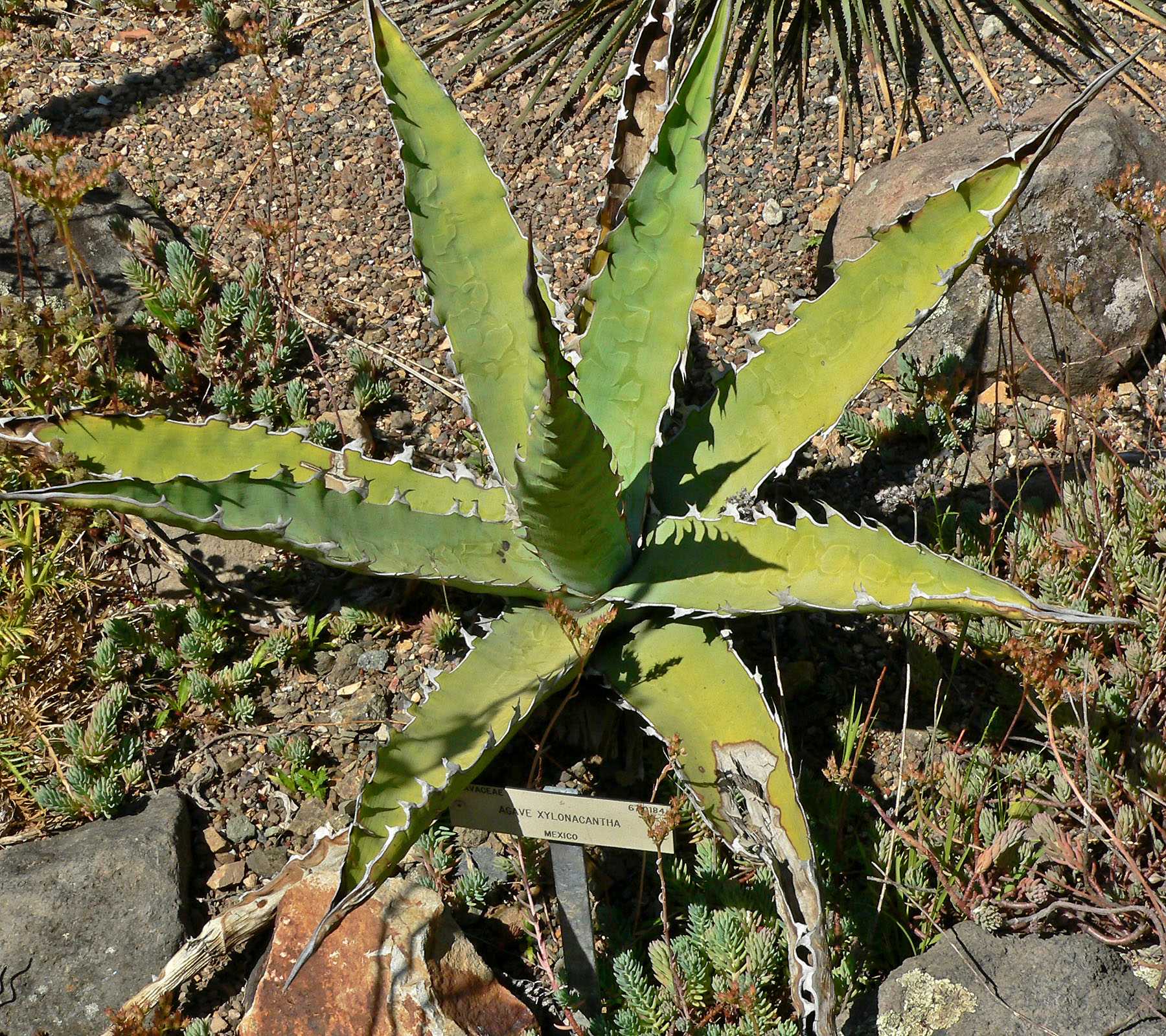

Conservation status
- Least Concern (IUCN 3.1)

- Secure (NatureServe)

Scientific classification
- Kingdom: Plantae
- Clade: Tracheophytes
- Clade: Angiosperms
- Clade: Monocots
- Order: Asparagales
- Family: Asparagaceae
- Subfamily: Agavoideae
- Genus: Agave
- Species: A. xylonacantha

Binomial name
- Agave xylonacantha Salm-Dyck

Synonyms
- Agave amurensis Jacobi; Agave carchariodonta Pamp.; Agave heteracantha var. splendens (Jacobi) A.Terracc.; Agave hybrida Verschaff.; Agave kochii Jacobi; Agave perbella Baker; Agave splendens Jacobi; Agave univittata var. carchariodonta (Pamp.) Breitung; Agave vanderdonckii Baker

= Agave xylonacantha =

Species of flowering plant

Agave xylonacantha is a plant species native to Hidalgo, Tamaulipas, Guanajuato and Queretaro in Mexico, but commonly cultivated as an ornamental on other regions. A. xylonacantha is an easy-to-grow member of the genus Agave. The specific epithet 'xylonacantha' means "wood spines".

== Description ==
Agave xylonacantha produces a basal rosette of up to 180 cm (6 feet) in diameter. Leaves are sword-shaped, up to 90 cm (3 feet) long and 7.5 cm (3 inches) across, each ending in a spine about 4– 5 cm (1.6-2 inches) long. Margins of the leaves have spines up to 3 cm (1.2 inches) across. This gives the margins an undulating appearance. Flowering stalks can reach a height of 3.3 m (11 feet). Flowers are up to 3.5 cm (1.5 inches) in diameter with greenish tepals.

Cultivars include:

- 'Frostbite': the leaf's edges are a creamy yellow
- 'Blue': the leaves are blue-green
