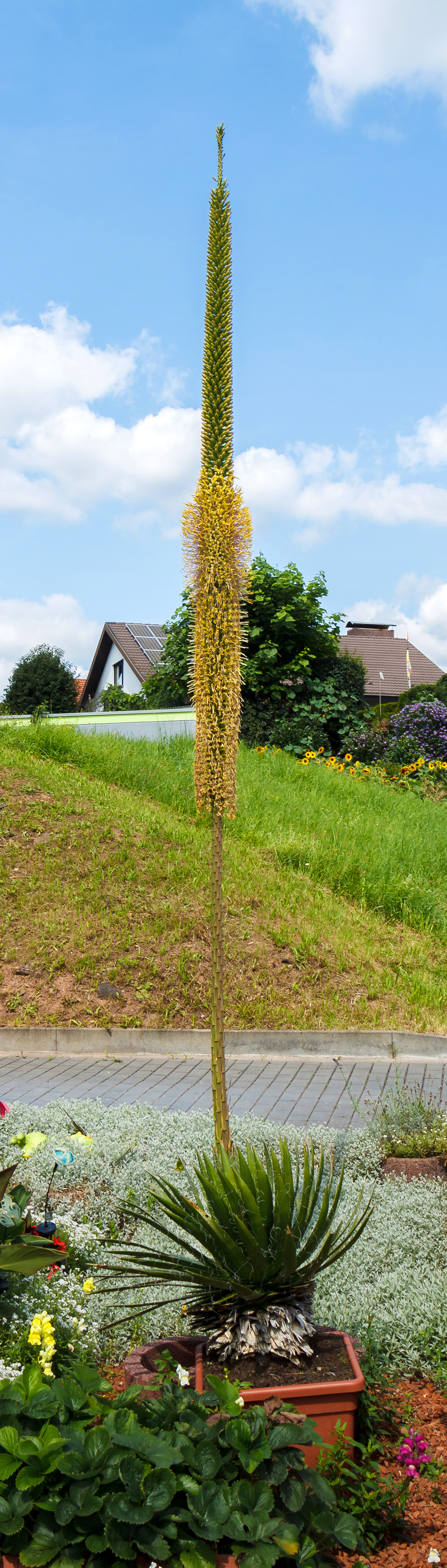

Conservation status
- Least Concern (IUCN 3.1)

Scientific classification
- Kingdom: Plantae
- Clade: Tracheophytes
- Clade: Angiosperms
- Clade: Monocots
- Order: Asparagales
- Family: Asparagaceae
- Subfamily: Agavoideae
- Genus: Agave
- Species: A. filifera

Binomial name
- Agave filifera Salm-Dyck

Synonyms
- Agave filamentosa Salm-Dyck; Agave pseudofilifera H. Ross & Lanza; Bonapartea filamentosa (Salm-Dyck) Boucen.

= Agave filifera =

Species of flowering plant

Agave filifera, the thread agave, is a species of flowering plant in the family Asparagaceae, native to Central Mexico from Querétaro to Mexico State. It is a small or medium-sized succulent plant that forms stemless rosette up to 3 feet (91 cm) across and up to 2 feet (61 cm) tall. The leaves are dark green to a bronzish-green in color and have very ornamental white bud imprints. The flower stalk is up to 11.5 feet (3.5 m) tall and is densely loaded with yellowish-green to dark purple flowers up to 2 inches (5.1 cm) long. Flowers appear in autumn and winter.

This evergreen succulent perennial requires heated indoor culture during winter in temperate regions, though it may be placed outside during summer months. It has gained the Royal Horticultural Society's Award of Garden Merit. In general, Agave do not need to be repotted every year. Most of the species commonly found in cultivation grow very slowly and will take a long time to outgrow their pot. It is also best to handle the Agave as little as possible, since they do not like to be disturbed.

Because the species is widespread and appears to have a stable population, it is not considered by the IUCN to be threatened.

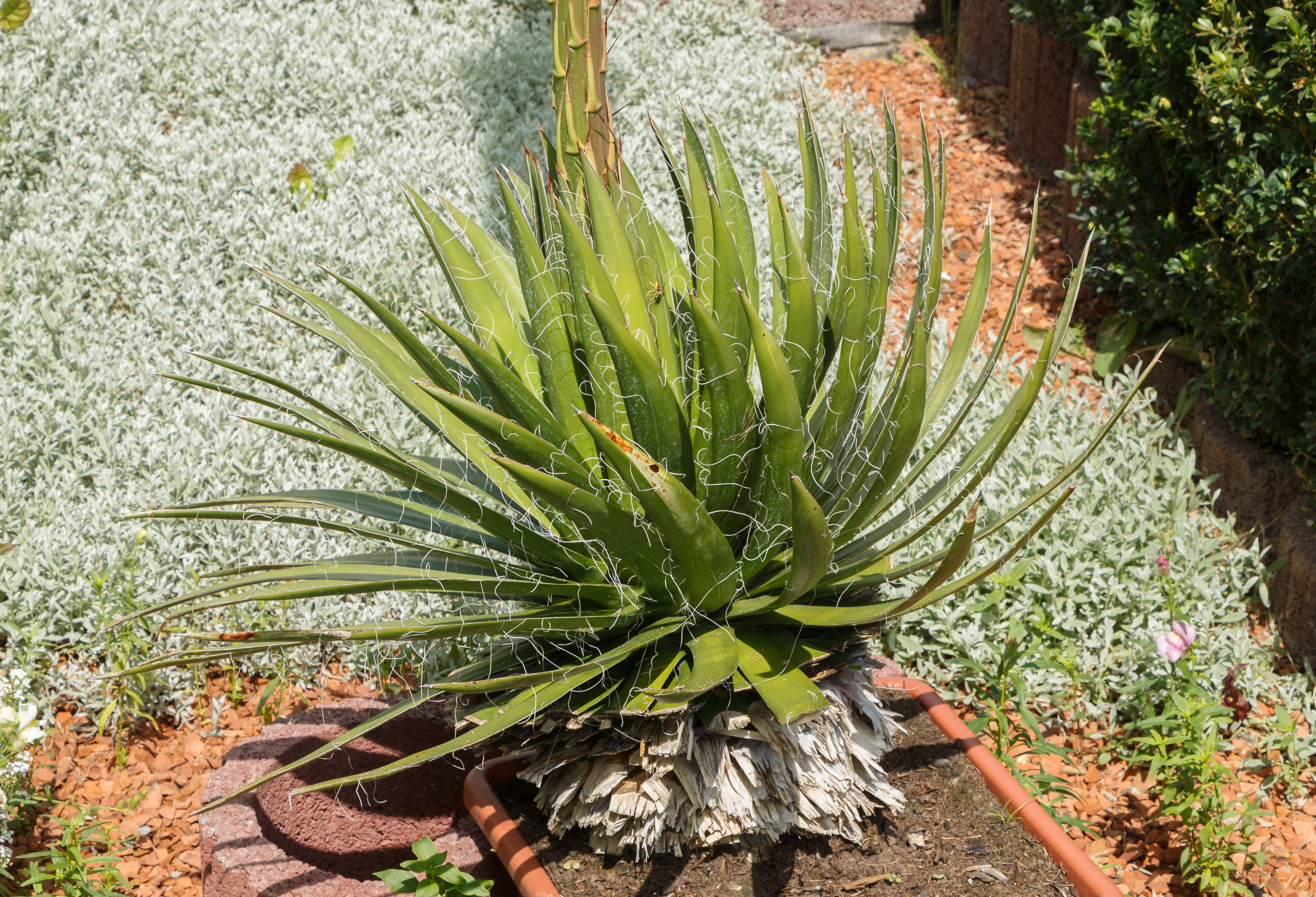
Leaves

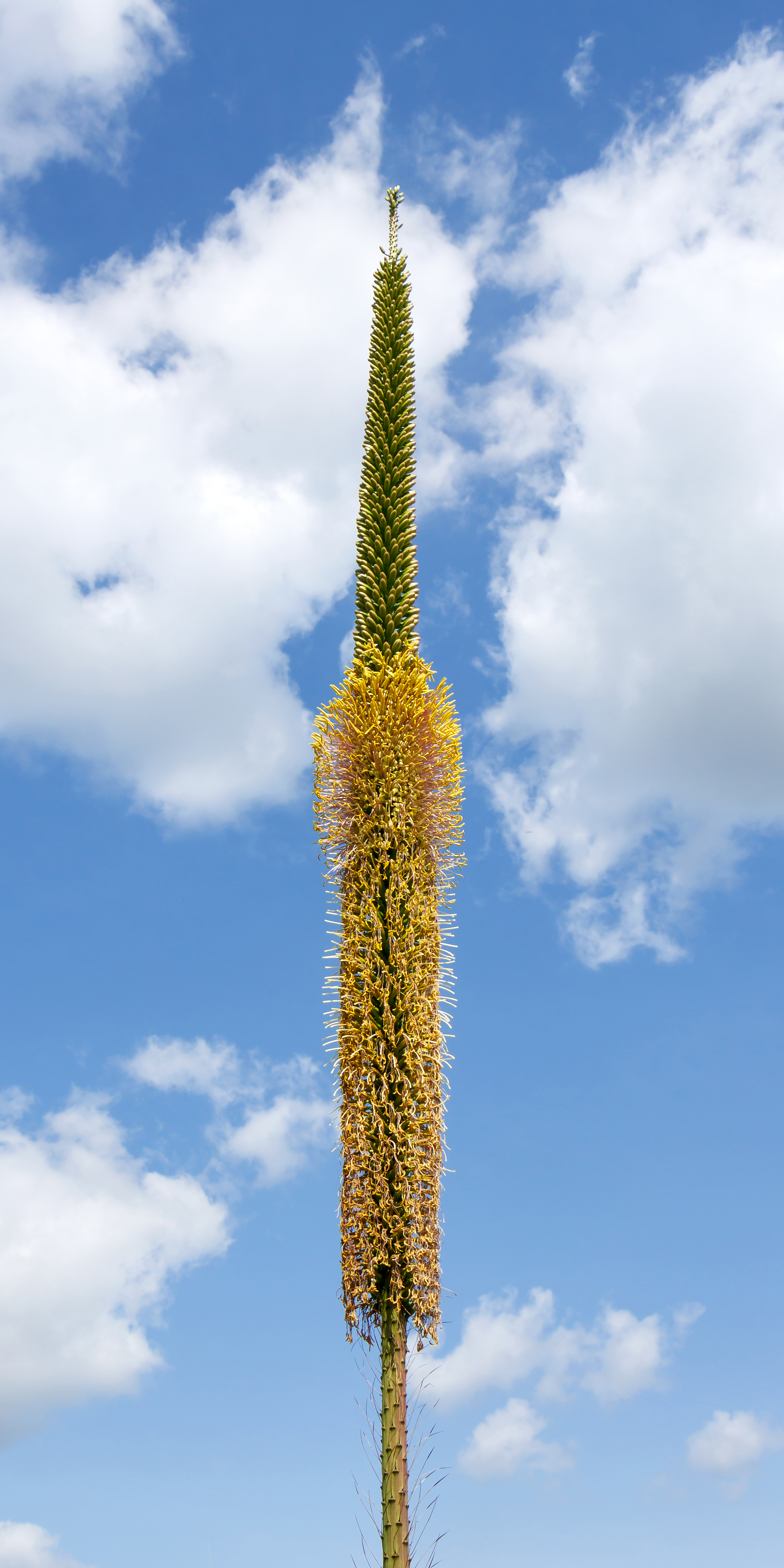
Inflorescence

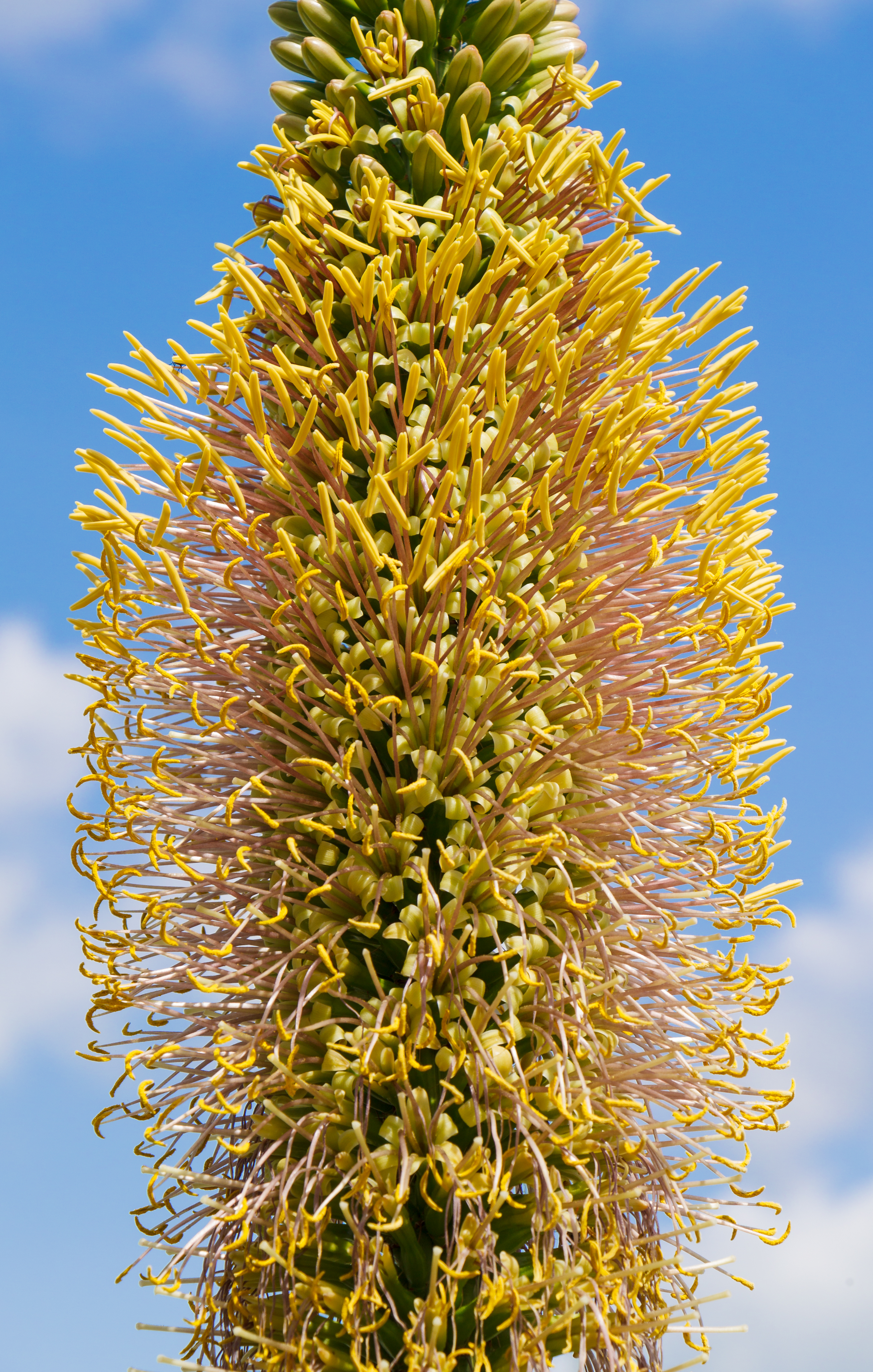
Flowers
