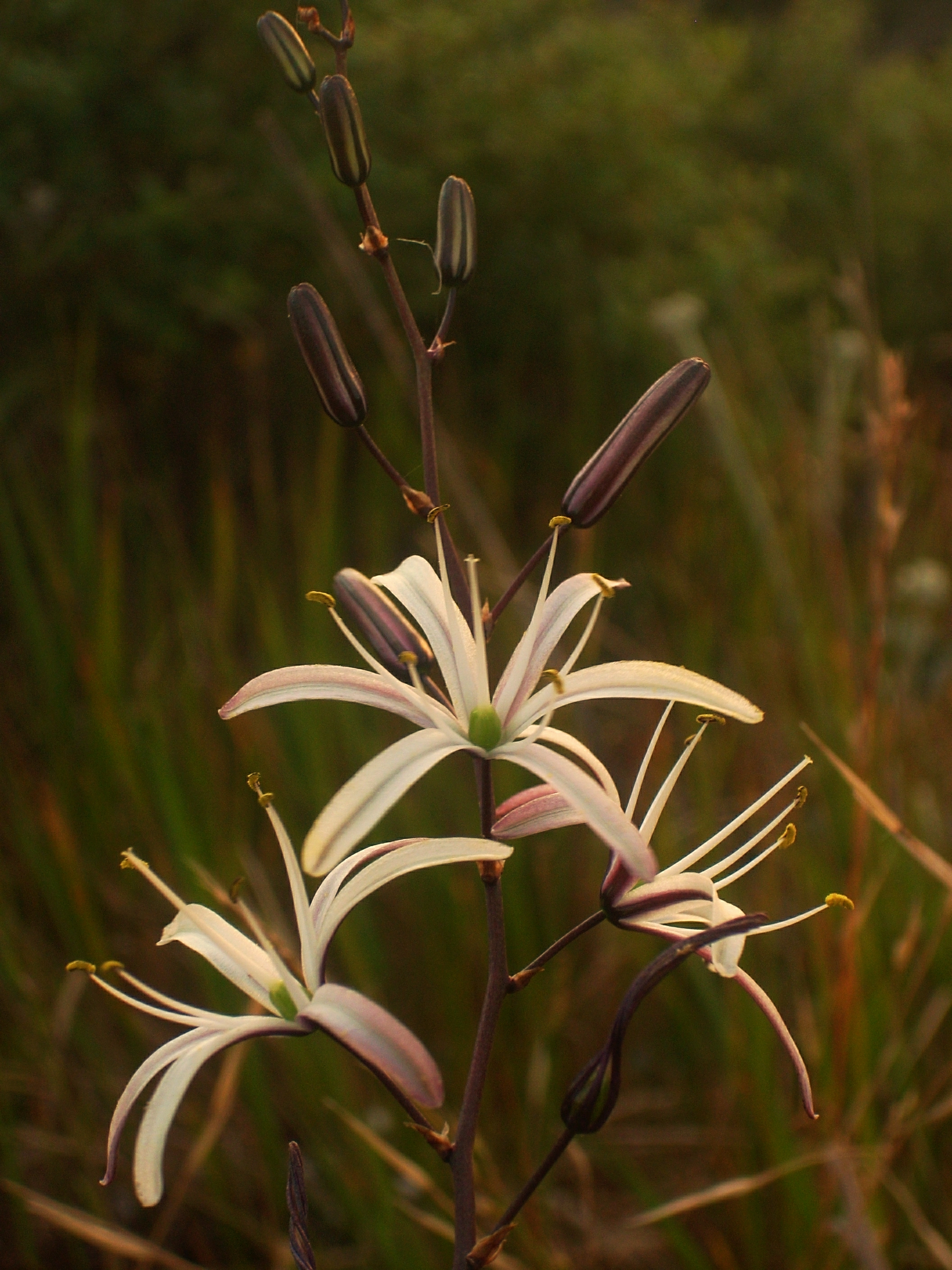
- Chlorogalum pomeridianum Wavy-leafed soap plant

Scientific classification
- Kingdom: Plantae
- Clade: Tracheophytes
- Clade: Angiosperms
- Clade: Monocots
- Order: Asparagales
- Family: Asparagaceae
- Subfamily: Agavoideae
- Genus: Chlorogalum (Lindl.) Kunth

Synonyms
- Laothoe Raf.; Ornithogalum section Chlorogalum Lindl.

= Chlorogalum =

Chlorogalum Soap plant, Amole

Genus of flowering plants

The common names soap plant, soaproot and amole refer to the genus Chlorogalum. They are native to western North America, with some species in Oregon but mostly found in California. Common names of the genus and several species derive from their use as soap.

Soap plants are perennial plants, with more or less elongated bulbs, depending on the species. The bulbs can be white or brown, and in most species have a fibrous coat. The flowers are borne on a long central stem, and appear to have six separate petals (not all are petals in the technical sense). There are six stamens, which are prominent in most species.

== Taxonomy ==
The placement of the genus Chlorogalum has varied considerably. In the APG III system, followed here, it is placed in the family Asparagaceae, subfamily Agavoideae, based on molecular systematics evidence. The second edition of the Jepson Manual places the genus in Agavaceae (equivalent to the APG III subfamily Agavoideae). Until the 1980s, the genus was generally treated in the Lily family, Liliaceae, in the order Liliales, e.g. the Flora of North America, published in 1993 onwards, has Chlorogalum in Liliaceae. The genus has also been placed in its own family, Chorogalaceae, or in a group within the hyacinth family Hyacinthaceae (now Scilloideae), in the order Asparagales. In 1999, phylogenetic studies based on molecular evidence, suggested that, along with Camassia, Chlorogalum seemed to be most closely related to Agave and Anthericum.

The members of the genus with diurnal flowering and a chromosome count of 2n = 60 were placed into their own genus, Hooveria after phylogenetic molecular research showed that Chlorogalum was not monophyletic.

== Species ==
Five species are currently classified in the genus. All except the Wavy-leafed Soap Plant, Chlorogalum pomeridianum, have rather restricted distributions, with little overlap. The Wavy-leafed Soap Plant, however, has a range that virtually encompasses those of all other members of the genus, and is the most common of them.

Image	Scientific name	Common name	Distribution
	Chlorogalum angustifolium	Narrow-leaf Soap Plant	inner north Pacific Coast Ranges of California and southern Oregon and the Sierra Nevada foothills
	Chlorogalum grandiflorum	Red Hills Soaproot	north and central Sierra Nevada foothills
	Chlorogalum pomeridianum	Wavy-leafed Soap Plant	anywhere in California except the higher Sierra Nevada and the deserts, and also in south-western Oregon

Formerly included:

- Hooveria parviflora (S.Watson) D.W.Taylor & D.J.Keil as Chlorogalum parviflorum
- Hooveria purpurea (Brandegee) D.W.Taylor & D.J.Keil as Chlorogalum purpureum

== Uses ==
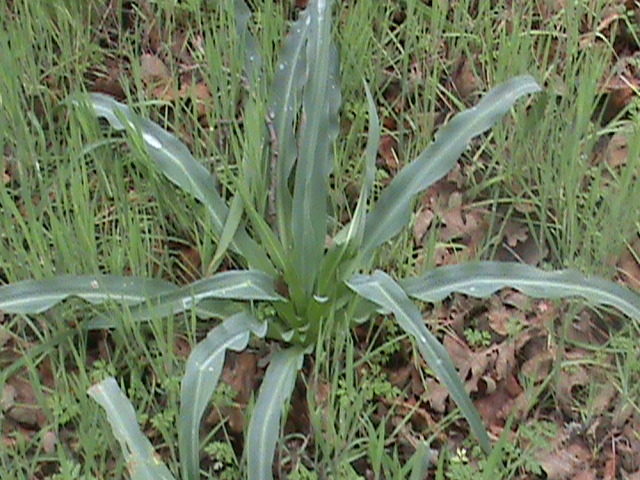
Soap plant growing in the forest

The fibers surrounding the bulb were widely used, bound together, to make small brushes. Extracts of the bulbs could also be used as a sealant or glue.

Cleansing

At least two of the species are used for detergent properties by Native Americans and early European settlers, specifically the C. pomeridianum by tribes including Miwok, and the C. angustifolium by the Karuk people. The juices of the bulb contain saponins that form a lather when mixed with water, making the bulbs useful as a kind of soap. This is the origin of several of the plants' common names. It was particularly used for washing hair, since C. pomeridianum at least was held to be effective against dandruff.

Cuisine

The young leaves of certain species can be used as food, but the saponins in the bulbs make these poisonous. However saponins are very poorly absorbed by the body and usually pass straight through, and in any case they can be destroyed by thorough cooking. The Miwok and Chumash people roasted and ate the bulbs as a winter food. In February 1847 Patrick Breen of the ill-fated Donner Party recorded that a Native American gave the starving settler some "roots resembling Onions in shape [that] taste some like a sweet potatoe [sic], all full of little tough fibres." Breen's son later called the roots "California soap-root"—almost certainly C. pomeridianum.

Medicinal

The bulbs also had various medicinal uses, both external (for making a poultice to be used as an antiseptic, or as a rub in cases of rheumatism) and internal (decoctions were used for a range of purposes, including as a diuretic, as a laxative and against stomachache).

Fishing

Many of California's Native American tribes traditionally used soaproot, or the root of various yucca species, as a fish poison. They would pulverize the roots, then mix the powder in water to create a foam, and then add the suds to a stream. This would kill, or incapacitate, the fish, which could be gathered easily from the surface of the water. Among the tribes using this technique were the Lassik, the Luiseño, and the Mattole.

== See also ==
- Hooveria, which now encompasses the diurnal plants formerly placed in this genus.
- Hastingsia and Camassia, which are placed in a large clade with Chlorogalum that is sister to Hooveria.
