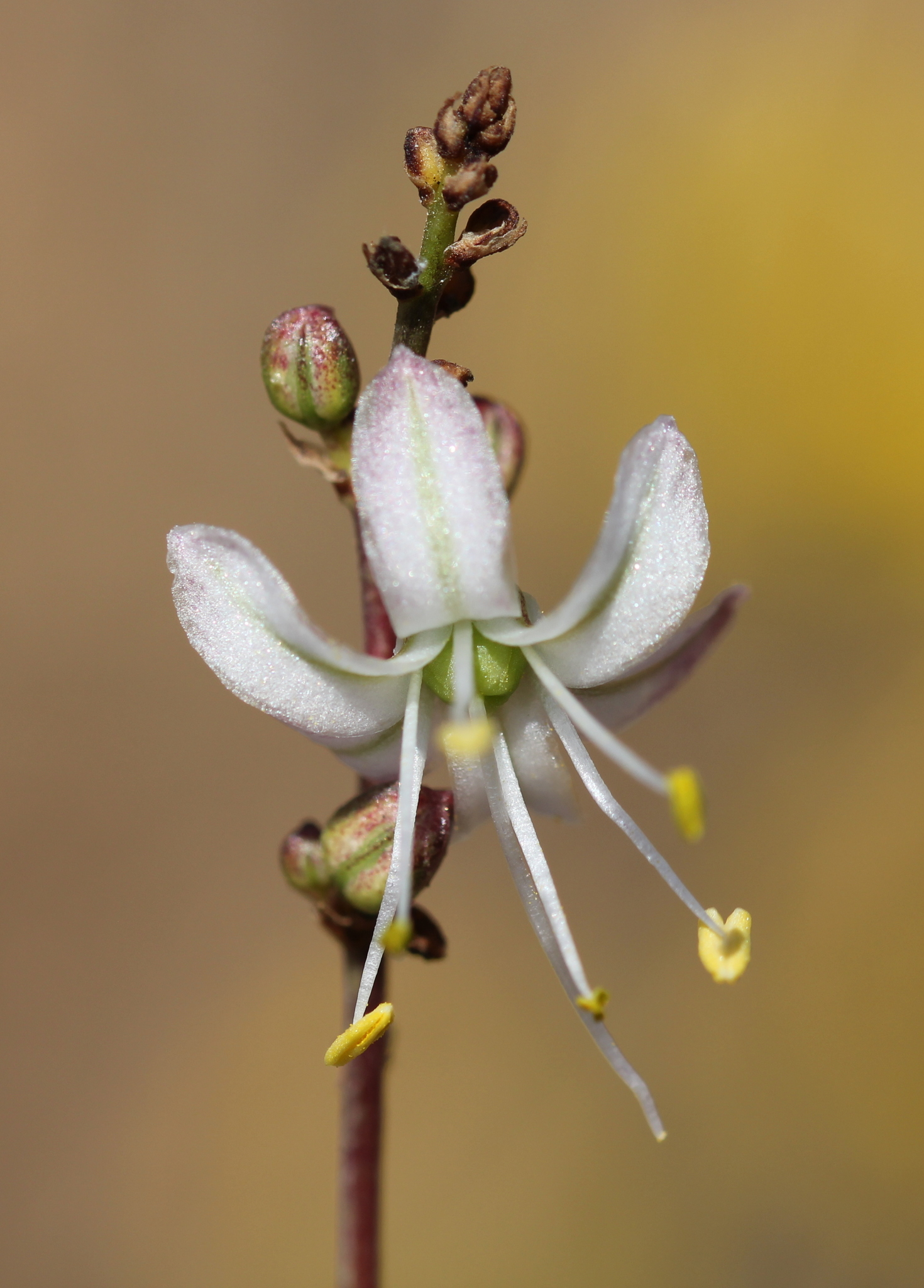
- Hooveria parviflora

Scientific classification
- Kingdom: Plantae
- Clade: Tracheophytes
- Clade: Angiosperms
- Clade: Monocots
- Order: Asparagales
- Family: Asparagaceae
- Subfamily: Agavoideae
- Genus: Hooveria; D.W.Taylor & D.J.Keil

Type species
- Hooveria parviflora

= Hooveria (plant) =

Genus of plants

Hooveria is a genus of perennial bulbous plants in the Agavaceae family native to California and northwest Baja California. They are among a number of taxa referred to as amole (having detergent properties). They are characterized by diurnal flowering and were formerly placed in the genus Chlorogalum, which consists of vespertine flowering species. They are named in honor of Robert F. Hoover, a field botanist from California who was responsible for founding the botanical garden and herbarium at California State Polytechnic College.

== Description ==
This genus grows as herbaceous perennials from bulbs. The bulb is ovoid to more or less elongate, with a white to brown outer coat. The basal leaves are shaped linear, and have wavy margins. The inflorescence is a panicle, with linear-shaped bracts. There are one to several flowers and buds emerging from each node.

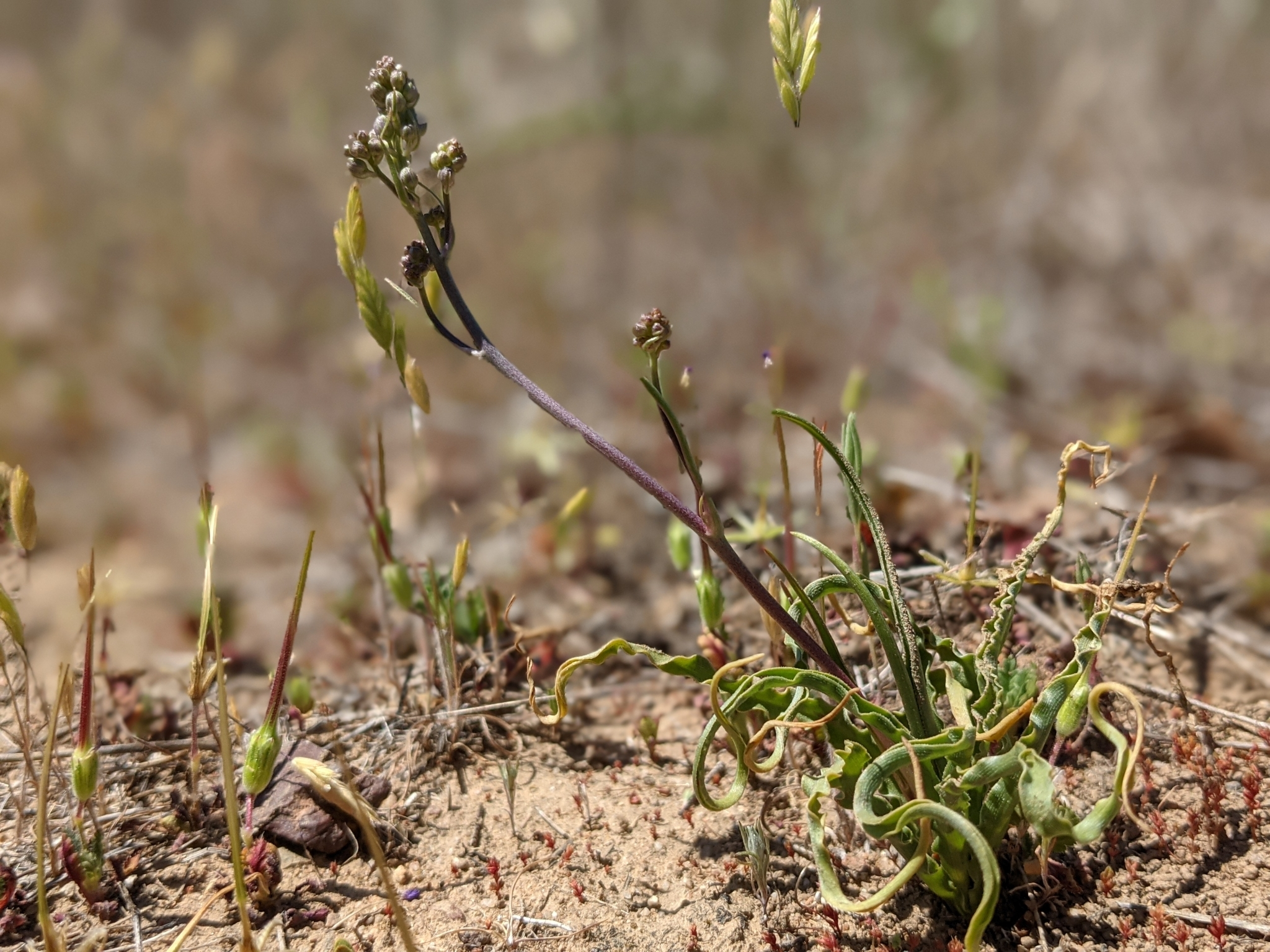
Hooveria purpurea var. purpurea

The flower is only open for one day, opening in the morning and closing by evening. There are 6 perianth parts in 2 petal-like whorls, free and recurved, with the perianth colored white to purple or more or less pink. The perianth is persisting in fruit and twists together distal to the ovary. There are 6 stamens that are inserted on the bases of the tepals, with the anthers attached at the middle.

== Taxonomy ==
Chromosome number is 2n = 60

=== Taxonomic history ===
In 1940, Robert F. Hoover, on his monograph of Chlorogalum, noted a division in the genus on the basis of diurnal and vespertine flowering species. He also noted that the same two diurnal species had similar floral morphology. He kept the genus whole on the basis that their vegetative morphology and geographic distribution was quite close and consistent.

In 1970, a study reported that the vespertine species have chromosome numbers ranging from 2n = 30 to 2n = 36, while the two diurnal species have a chromosome number of 2n = 60. The karyotypes of the diurnal species were noted to have five, instead of six pairs of large chromosomes, which means they were not simply just polyploids formed from the doubling of a 2n = 30 base.

In 2013, a study of the phylogenetics in the Chlorogaloideae subfamily also suggested that the genus Chlorogalum was not monophyletic. Their analysis showed that the vespertine species form a well-supported clade that excluded the diurnal species. The diurnal species were suggested to be sister to a larger clade comprising the vespertine Chlorogalum, Hastingsia, and Camassia.

Another study in 2015 of the Chlorogaloideae subfamily with molecular phylogenetic tools showed that Chlorogalum is not monophyletic, and that the two diurnal species were placed in a clade that is sister to the remainder of the Chlorogaloideae consisting of the vespertine Chlorogalum, along with Hastingsia, and Camassia.

A 2018 paper in Phytoneuron described Hooveria as a taxonomic genus, composed of the two diurnal species, based on the evidence provided by the phylogenetic research that Chlorogalum comprises two lineages.

=== List of species ===
- Hooveria parviflora (S.Watson) D.W.Taylor & D.J.Keil
- Hooveria purpurea (Brandegee) D.W.Taylor & D.J.Keil

== Distribution and habitat ==
The genus is disjunct in distribution. The northern species, Hooveria purpurea is native to Monterey and San Luis Obispo counties, where it is found in foothill woodland areas. The second species, Hooveria parviflora, is found in southeastern Los Angeles and southwest Riverside counties, but is primarily distributed in coastal Orange County and San Diego County, crossing over the border into extreme northwestern Baja California, and it grows in open clearings of chaparral, coastal sage scrub, grassland and open woodlands.
