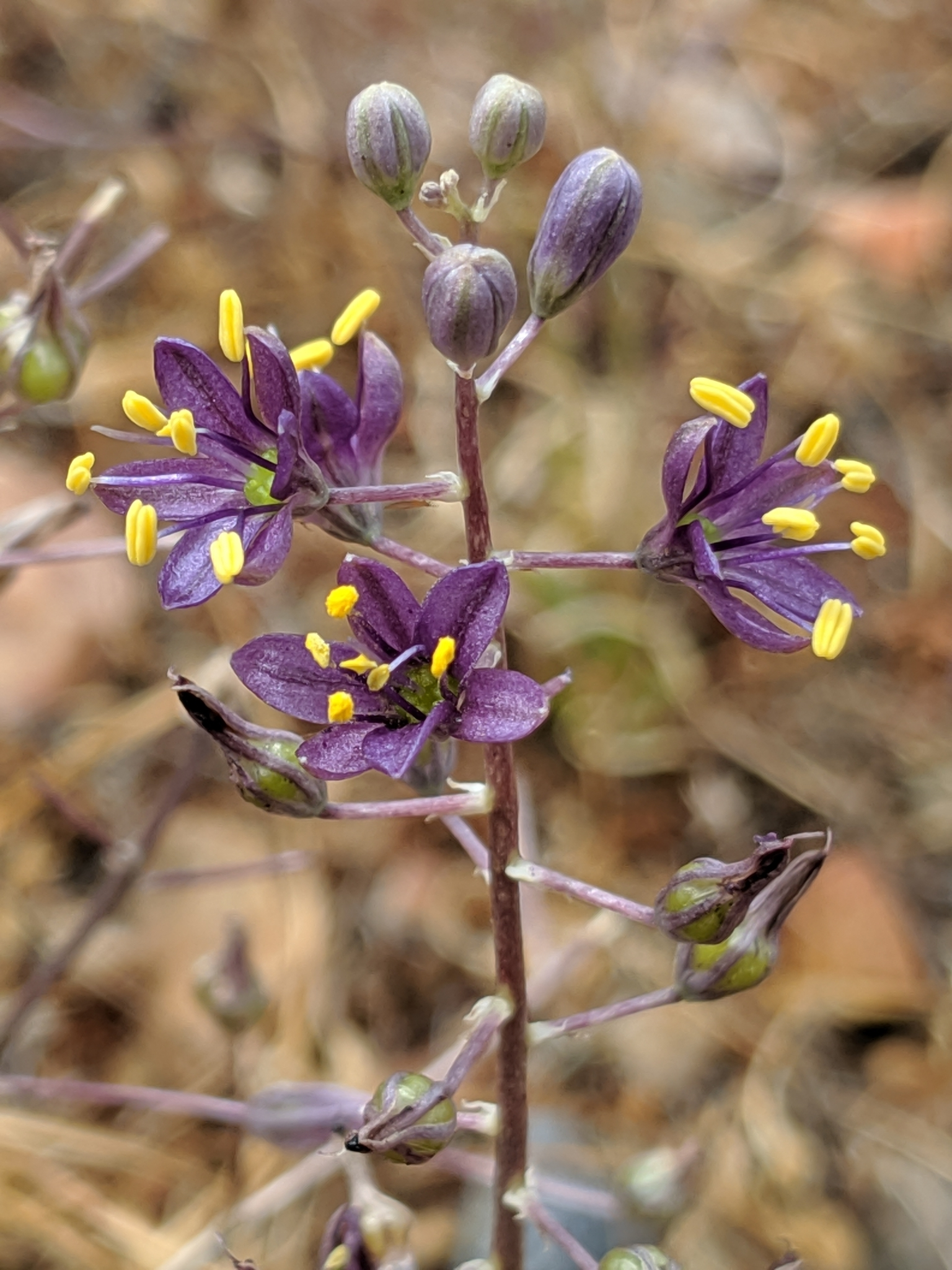
- var. reducta

Conservation status
- Critically Imperiled (NatureServe)

Scientific classification
- Kingdom: Plantae
- Clade: Tracheophytes
- Clade: Angiosperms
- Clade: Monocots
- Order: Asparagales
- Family: Asparagaceae
- Subfamily: Agavoideae
- Genus: Hooveria
- Species: H. purpurea

Binomial name
- Hooveria purpurea (Brandegee) D.W.Taylor & D.J.Keil

= Hooveria purpurea =

Species of flowering plant

Hooveria purpurea is a species of flowering plant related to the agaves known by the common name purple amole. This species of soap plant is endemic to California, where it grows in the Santa Lucia Range, in the Central Coast region. There are two varieties of this plant, and both are believed to be quite rare. It is a federally listed threatened species.

== Description ==
Hooveria purpurea is a perennial plant growing from a bulb about 3 centimeters in diameter. The narrow, wavy leaves grow at the base of the stem. The leaves are bright green and have thick midribs. There are usually one to eight leaves, but plants with up to fourteen have been noted. The stem bears flowers at widely spaced nodes. Each flower has curled tepals each less than a centimeter long in shades of blue or purple. The flowers have long stamens with yellow anthers around a protruding style. The two varieties of the species can be told apart by their sizes; var. purpurea (the variety usually called purple amole) grows up to 40 centimeters tall and var. reducta (Camatta Canyon amole) reaches only 20 centimeters. About 90% of the plants are of var. purpurea.

The blooming period of the Hooveria purpurea is from May to June.

== Taxonomy ==
This species was formerly placed in the genus Chlorogalum, as Chlorogalum purpurea. It was moved into a new genus, Hooveria, on the basis of molecular phylogenetic research showing it as distinct.

== Etymology ==
The name Hooveria is named after California botanist Robert Francis Hoover, who contributed greatly to the discovery of many California flora. Hoover was the author of The Vascular Plants of San Luis Obispo County, California, and founder of the herbarium at California Polytechnic State University.

== Ecology and distribution ==
This is a plant of the Mediterranean climate with hot, rainless summers and wet winters. The Hooveria purpurea grows in woodland areas of Southern Monterey and San Luis Obispo California coastline. It grows on highly weathered, rocky, reddish clay soils in foothill woodland areas near the south-central San Luis Obispo County. Hooviera purpurea var. reducta, is endemic to the Santa Lucia Range of Monterey and San Luis Obispo Counties. It is known from only two locations, the Army installation Fort Hunter Liggett and the National Guard post Camp Roberts. There are a total of four populations, probably totalling under 10,000 total individuals. The habitat is grassland with patches of oak woodland. The Camatta Canyon amole, var. reducta, is known only from the La Panza Range in the center of San Luis Obispo County, about 61 kilometers away from the nearest population of purple amole. There is a single population with a variable number of individuals. The population sizes are difficult to estimate because the plants bloom infrequently and go dormant for several seasons at a time.

Both varieties of this plant grow in soil lined with cryptogamic crusts. Purple amole is often associated with undisturbed or recovering soil crusts dominated by cyanobacteria. The soils beneath are clay topped with loam and a gravelly top layer. Much of the habitat is fragmented due to a history of crop cultivation in the area. Plant associates in the area include rusty popcornflower (Plagiobothrys nothofulvus), miniature lupine (Lupinus bicolor), California goldfields (Lasthenia californica), and yellowflower tarweed (Holocarpha virgata), as well as another soap plant species, wavyleaf soap plant (Chlorogalum pomeridianum).

Camatta Canyon amole grows in dry, pebbly, red clay soils; though some sources state this plant is part of the serpentine soils flora, it is actually more often found in a unique form of laterite, and never serpentine. Floral associates include crown brodiaea (Brodiaea coronaria), bluedicks (Dipterostemon capitatus), winecup clarkia (Clarkia purpurea), and sometimes chamise (Adenostoma fasciculatum).

There is a positive correlation between winter rainfall amounts and the number of purple amole that bear flowers the following spring.

== Conservation ==
This plant has a limited distribution in the two counties. The two populations of purple amole are secure from destruction or development of their habitat. Other potentially damaging forces include gophers, which consume the plants, and feral pigs, which eat the bulbs and trample the habitat. Camatta Canyon amole occurs in an area used by off-road vehicle enthusiasts and herds of grazing cattle; these two forces tend to damage cryptogamic soil crusts and encourage the invasion of non-native plants. Invasive plants are a main threat to both varieties, as they outcompete them and change the local fire regime; the Camatta Canyon amole occurs in a single clumped, localized population that could be reduced significantly in a wildfire. Other suggested threats to the species include military activities and road maintenance.
