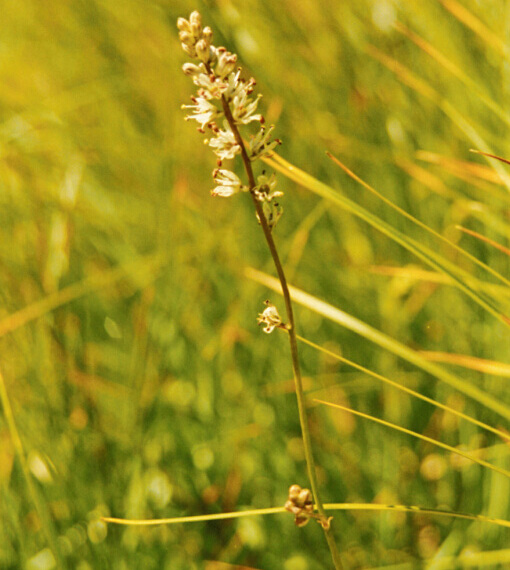

Scientific classification
- Kingdom: Plantae
- Clade: Tracheophytes
- Clade: Angiosperms
- Clade: Monocots
- Order: Asparagales
- Family: Asparagaceae
- Subfamily: Agavoideae
- Genus: Hastingsia
- Species: H. serpentinicola

Binomial name
- Hastingsia serpentinicola Becking

= Hastingsia serpentinicola =

Species of flowering plant

Hastingsia serpentinicola is a species of flowering plant known by the common name Klamath rushlily. It is native to the mountains of northwestern California and southwestern Oregon, where it grows in serpentine soils.

== Description ==
This is a perennial herb growing from a black bulb 2 to 4 centimeters long and producing an erect flower stem up to 50 centimeters tall. A number of long, bending leaves surround the stem at its base, and the rest of the stem is naked. The top portion of the stem is a narrow, pointed inflorescence of many white or greenish lilylike flowers. Each small flower has six curled perianth parts and six protruding stamens with very large anthers. The flowers fall away to leave the developing fruits, which are capsules a few millimeters wide containing black seeds.
