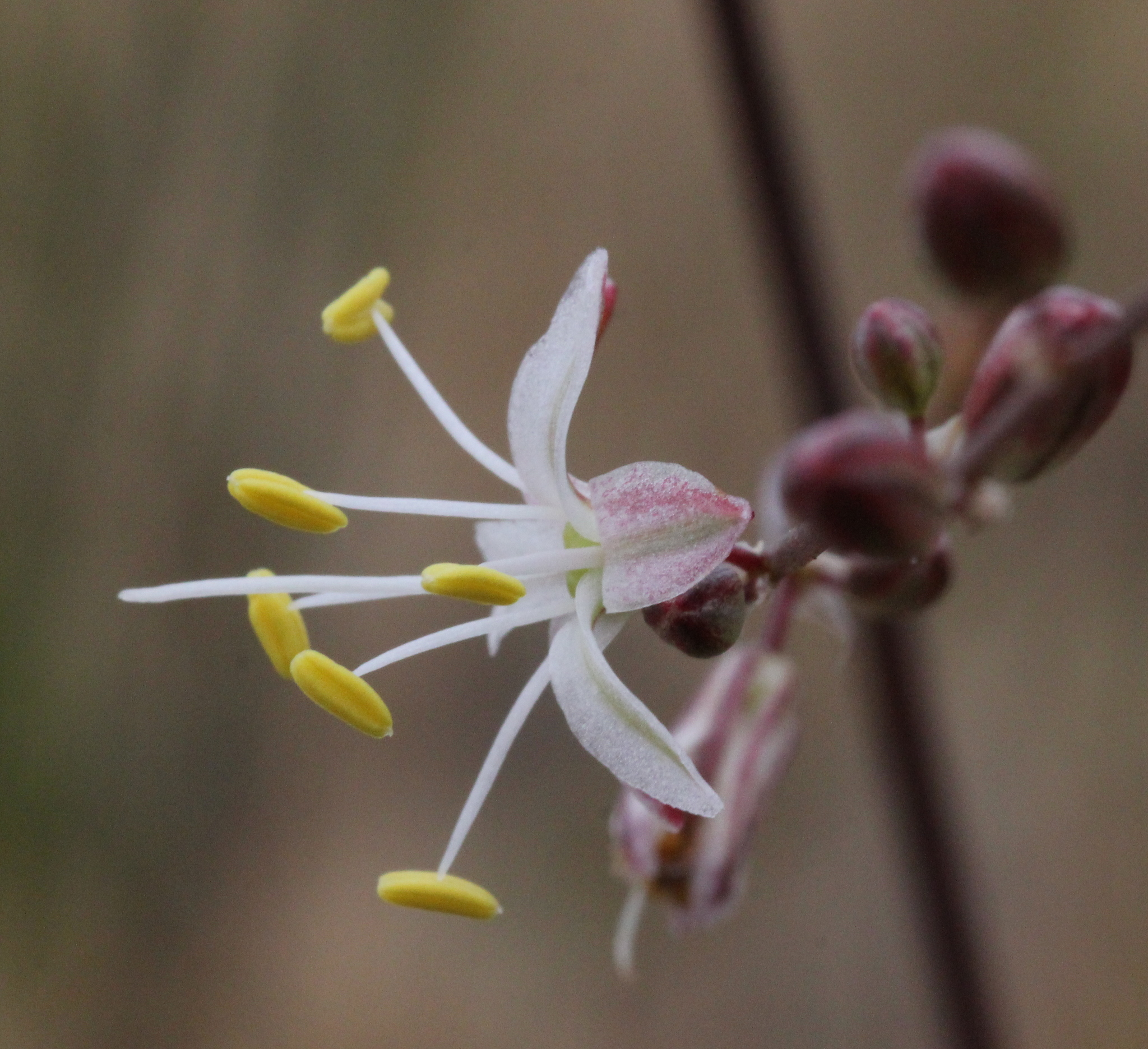

Conservation status
- Apparently Secure (NatureServe)

Scientific classification
- Kingdom: Plantae
- Clade: Tracheophytes
- Clade: Angiosperms
- Clade: Monocots
- Order: Asparagales
- Family: Asparagaceae
- Subfamily: Agavoideae
- Genus: Hooveria
- Species: H. parviflora

Binomial name
- Hooveria parviflora (S.Wats.) D.W. Taylor & D.J. Keil

Synonyms
- Chlorogalum parviflorum S. Wats.; Laothoe parviflora (S.Watson) Greene

= Hooveria parviflora =

Species of flowering plant

Hooveria parviflora is a species of perennial herb in the subfamily Agavoideae known by the common name smallflower soap plant. It is a monocot, native to coastal southern California and Baja California, where it is a member of the coastal sage scrub flora. It resembles a smaller version of Chlorogalum pomeridianum, with wavy leaves and white flowers that open during the day.

== Description ==
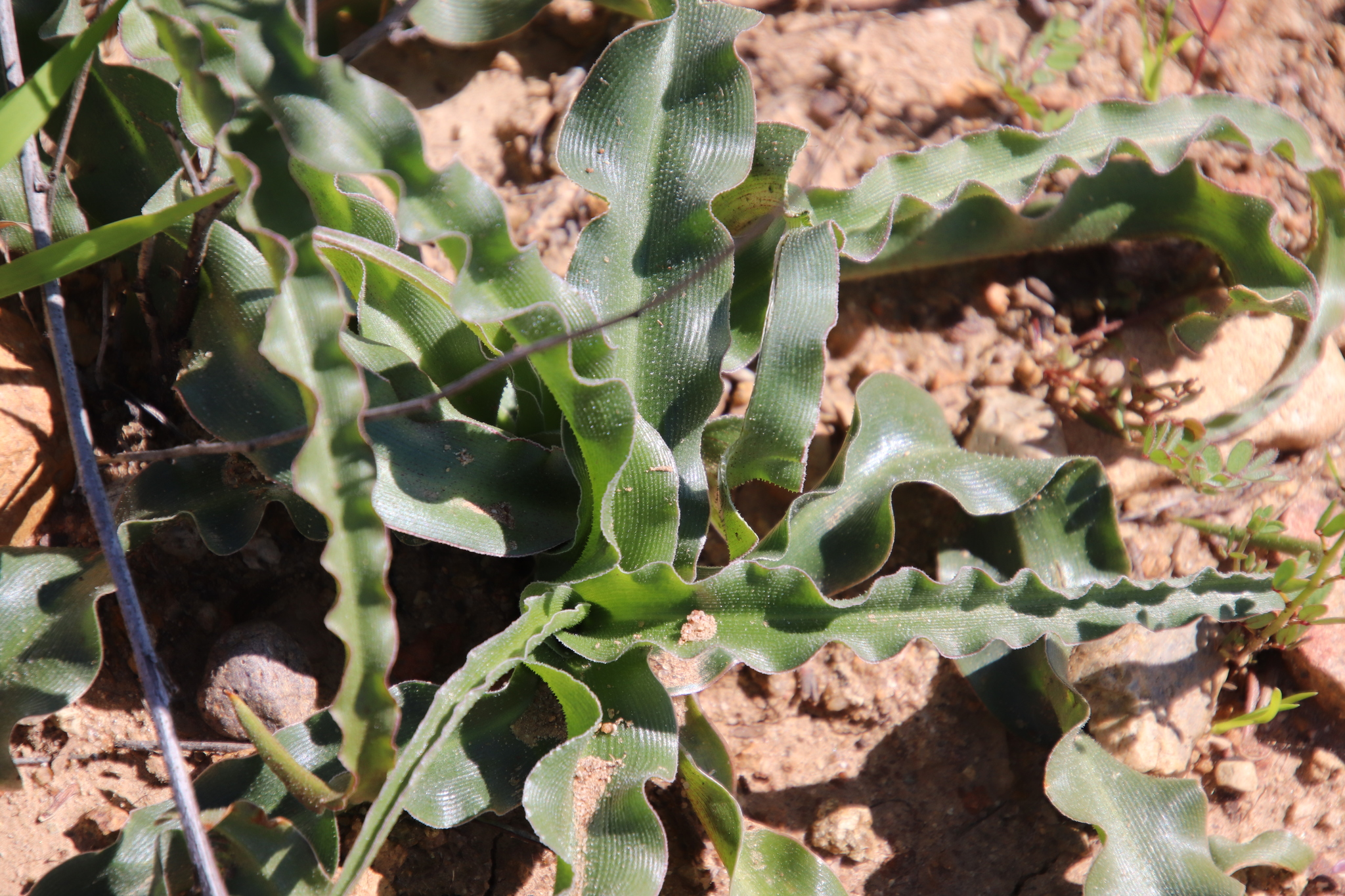
Vegetative rosette.

Hooveria parviflora is a perennial wildflower, growing from a bulb 4 to 7 cm (1.6 to 2.8 in) wide. The bulb is covered in a dark brown, membranous coat. The leaves emerge from the top of the bulb, and are long and narrow, with wavy margins, 3 to 9 mm (0.12 to 0.35 in) wide.

The inflorescence is 30 to 90 cm (12 to 35 in) tall, with ascending to erect branches. There are several flowers or buds per node. The pedicels, which suspend the flowers, are 2 to 8 mm (0.079 to 0.315 in) long. On the flower, the perianth parts spread from above the base, and are colored a white to pink, with a darker midvein. The perianth is 7 to 8 mm (0.28 to 0.31 in) in length, and the stamens are 3 to 4 mm (0.12 to 0.16 in) long. Atop the stamens are yellow anthers. The style is 7 to 9 mm (0.28 to 0.35 in) long. The fruits are 3 to 4 mm (0.12 to 0.16 in) large, with 1 to 2 black, ovoid seeds per chamber.

The flower opens in the morning, and is closed by the evening, only being open for a single day.

== Taxonomy ==
This species was described as Chlorogalum parviflorum by Sereno Watson. Phylogenetic research placed this species in a new taxa, Hooveria, separating it from Chlorogalum.

== Distribution and habitat ==
This species is native to California and Baja California. In California, it is primarily found near the coast of far Southern California, and is particularly common around San Diego. In Baja California, the plant is uncommon, and is only found in the extreme northwest of the state.
