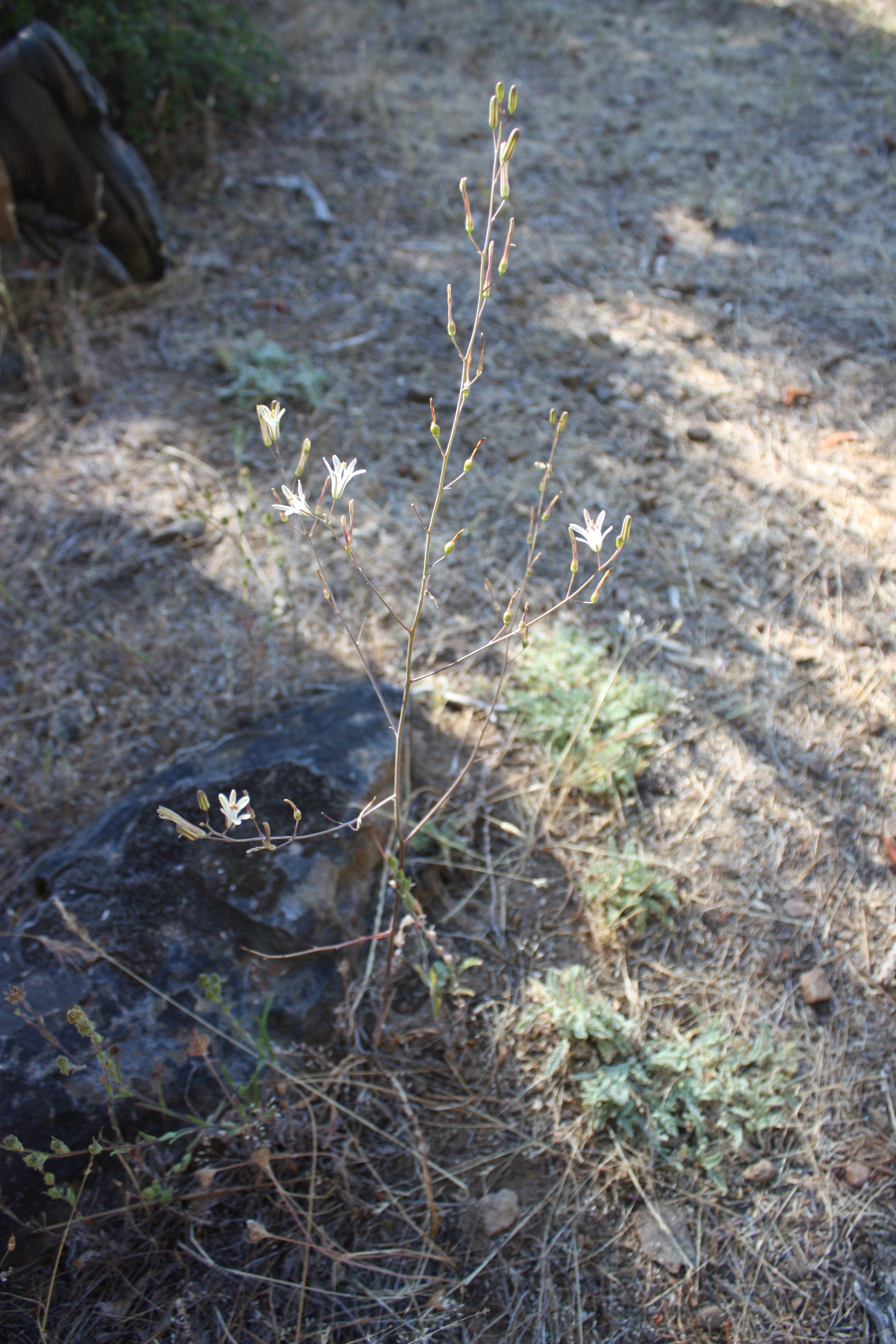

Scientific classification
- Kingdom: Plantae
- Clade: Tracheophytes
- Clade: Angiosperms
- Clade: Monocots
- Order: Asparagales
- Family: Asparagaceae
- Subfamily: Agavoideae
- Genus: Chlorogalum
- Species: C. angustifolium

Binomial name
- Chlorogalum angustifolium Kellogg

= Chlorogalum angustifolium =

Species of flowering plant

Chlorogalum angustifolium is a species of flowering plant, known by the common name narrowleaf soap plant.

== Distribution ==
It is native to the Sierra Nevada foothills and inner North Coast Ranges of California, and the mountains of southern Oregon, where it grows in heavy, rocky soils in woodland and on grassy hillsides.

== Description ==
Chlorogalum angustifolium is a perennial wildflower growing from a fibrous bulb a few centimeters wide. It has narrow basal leaves only a few millimeters wide.

The inflorescence may be up to 70 centimeters long and is composed of several ephemeral flowers which open in the evening and close by the following morning. Each has six tepals about a centimeter long which are white with yellow-green midveins. There are six stamens tipped with large yellow anthers.

The fruit is a capsule 1 to 3 millimeters long.

== Uses ==
The indigenous Karuk people of northern California used the soapy juice from the crushed bulbs of this plant as a detergent for washing clothing.
