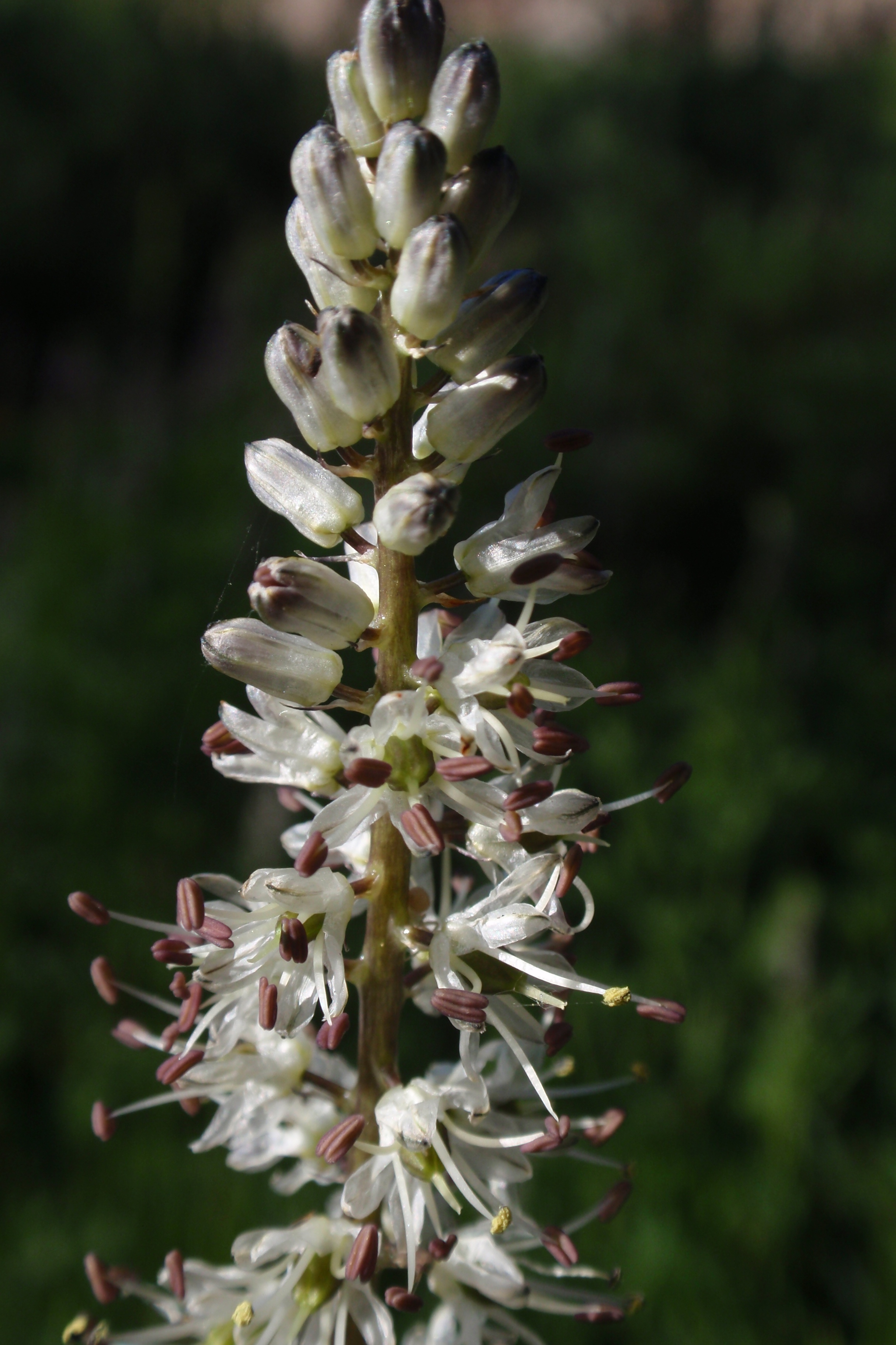

Scientific classification
- Kingdom: Plantae
- Clade: Tracheophytes
- Clade: Angiosperms
- Clade: Monocots
- Order: Asparagales
- Family: Asparagaceae
- Subfamily: Agavoideae
- Genus: Hastingsia
- Species: H. alba

Binomial name
- Hastingsia alba (Durand) S.Wats.

Synonyms
- Schoenolirion album

= Hastingsia alba =

Species of flowering plant

Hastingsia alba is a species of flowering plant known by the common names white rushlily and white schoenolirion.

The plant is native to northern California and southern Oregon, where it grows in wet places such as bogs and mountain meadows.

== Description ==
Hastingsia alba grows from a black-coated bulb a few centimeters wide and produces erect stems 40 to 90 centimeters tall. There are several long, thin, bending leaves about the base of the plant and the stems are naked.

The top of each stem is a dense, pointed inflorescence of many flowers, with smaller inflorescences branching off lower levels of the stem. Each flower is cream or greenish-white with six curly, lilylike tepals. Each has six white stamens with large brown anthers.

The flowers fall away to leave the fruits, which are green capsules containing black seeds.
