= Hastingsia bracteosa =

Conservation status
- Imperiled (NatureServe)

Scientific classification
- Kingdom: Plantae
- Clade: Tracheophytes
- Clade: Angiosperms
- Clade: Monocots
- Order: Asparagales
- Family: Asparagaceae
- Subfamily: Agavoideae
- Genus: Hastingsia
- Species: H. bracteosa

Binomial name
- Hastingsia bracteosa S.Watson

Species of flowering plant

Hastingsia bracteosa is a rare species of flowering plant in the agave subfamily of the asparagus family known by the common name large-flowered rushlily. It is endemic to Oregon in the United States, where it is limited to a twelve-mile stretch of the Illinois Valley in the southwestern part of the state.

This plant grows from a dark-coated bulb and produces gray-green leaves up to 52 centimeters long. The slender, erect scape grows up to 87 centimeters tall. At the top is an inflorescence which is a raceme of many flowers. Each flower has tepals roughly 1 centimeter long. Some plants produce white flowers and some purple, and where they occur together they can cross to produce pink flowers. White-flowered plants generally occur in the northern part of the species' very small range, and purple plants grow in the southern end, the two separated by a single meadow where they mix. The purple-flowered form was considered a separate species for a time, but they are similar enough that they are now treated as members of the same species.

This plant grows on boggy open slopes and in other wetland habitat such as fens, springs and wet meadows, often in areas with serpentine soils. Associated plant species include Darlingtonia californica, Helenium bigelovii, and Chamaecyparis lawsoniana. It is often found in serpentine fens dominated by Darlingtonia and with Gentiana setigera, Castilleja miniata ssp. elata, and Rudbeckia californica.
