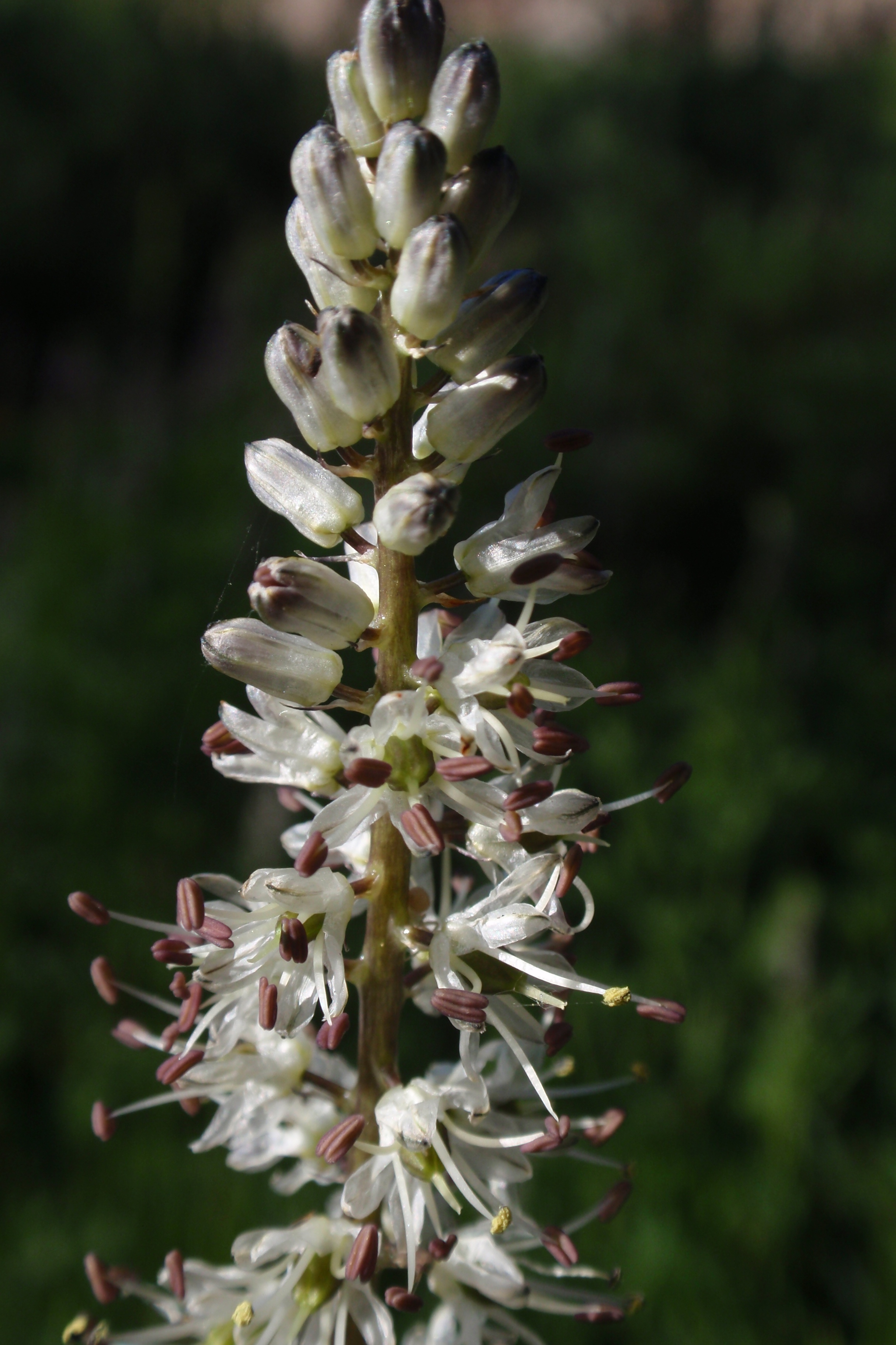
- Hastingsia alba

Scientific classification
- Kingdom: Plantae
- Clade: Tracheophytes
- Clade: Angiosperms
- Clade: Monocots
- Order: Asparagales
- Family: Asparagaceae
- Subfamily: Agavoideae
- Genus: Hastingsia; S.Wats.

= Hastingsia =

Rushlilies

Genus of flowering plants

Hastingsia is a small genus of flowering plants in the family Asparagaceae, subfamily Agavoideae, known generally as rushlilies. These are small perennial herbs endemic to serpentine soils of the Siskiyou-Klamath region in northern California and SW Oregon in the United States. They reach heights between 25 and 90 centimeters and have long linear leaves and racemes of small white flowers.

Species:

- Hastingsia alba (Durand) S.Watson - white rushlily - California and Oregon
- Hastingsia atropurpurea Becking - Oregon
- Hastingsia bracteosa S.Watson - largeflower rushlily - Oregon
- Hastingsia serpentinicola Becking - Klamath rushlily - California and Oregon

== Name ==
The genus is named after Serranus Clinton Hastings, a 19th-century California businessman and judge. Hastings created and endowed the Hastings College of Law. In 2020, a commission of Hastings College concluded that in the 1850s Serranus Hastings facilitated the genocide of the Yuki people in Mendocino County. In November 2021, the Board of Directors of Hastings College voted to change the name of the institution.
