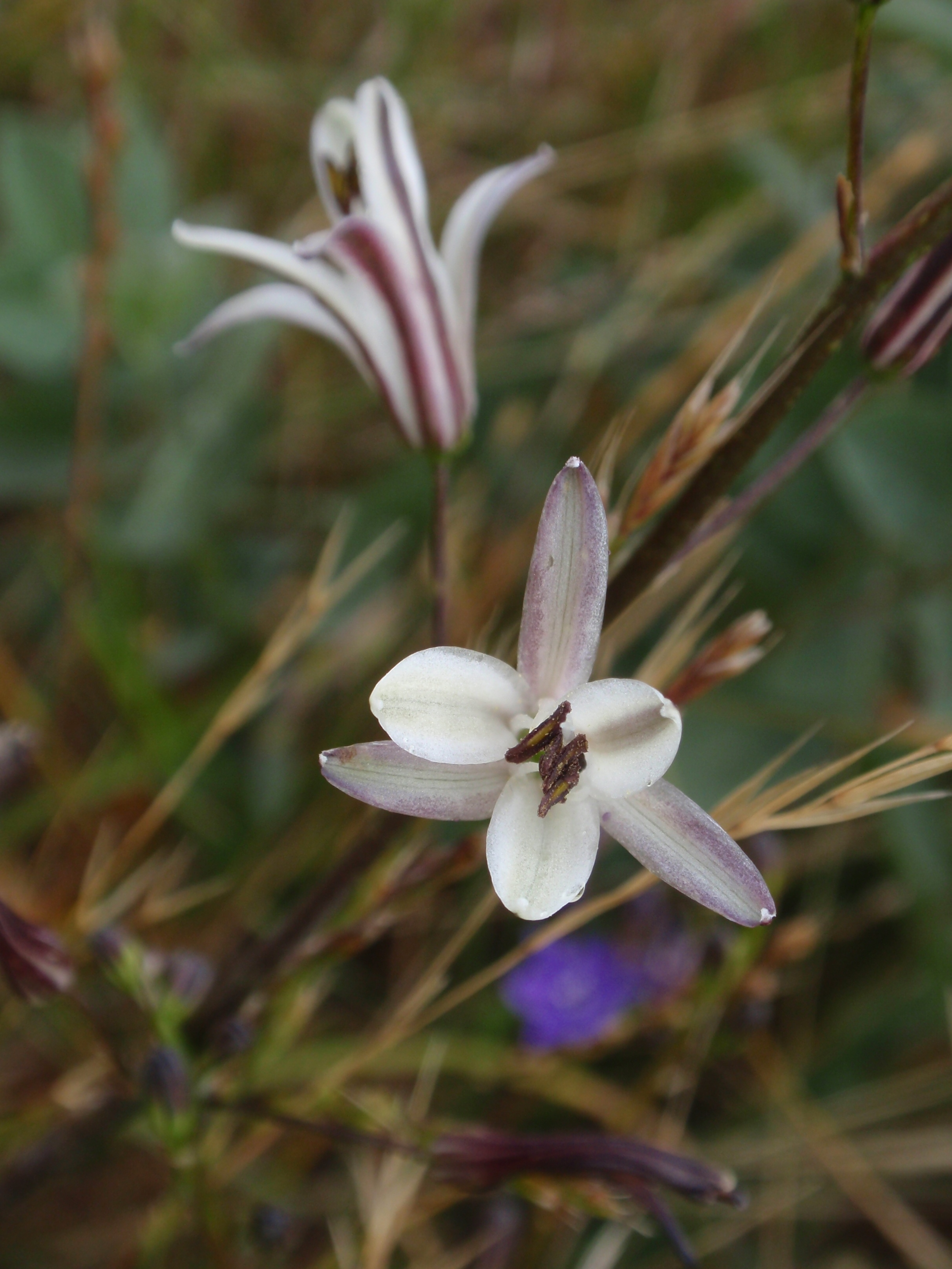

Scientific classification
- Kingdom: Plantae
- Clade: Tracheophytes
- Clade: Angiosperms
- Clade: Monocots
- Order: Asparagales
- Family: Asparagaceae
- Subfamily: Agavoideae
- Genus: Chlorogalum
- Species: C. pomeridianum

Binomial name
- Chlorogalum pomeridianum (DC.) Kunth

= Chlorogalum pomeridianum =

Species of plant

Chlorogalum pomeridianum, the wavy-leafed soap plant, California soaproot, or Amole, is the most common and most widely distributed of the soap plants, soaproots or amoles, which make up the genus Chlorogalum of flowering plants. It is occasionally known as the "wild potato", but given the plant's lack of either resemblance or relationship to the potato, this name is not recommended.

It is found in most of California from the coasts to the western foothills of the Sierra Nevada, and in the Klamath Mountains in southwestern Oregon, but not in either state's desert regions. Wavy-leafed soap plant grows on rock bluffs, grasslands, chaparral, and in open woodlands.

== Description ==
Like all the soap plants, Chlorogalum pomeridianum is a perennial that grows from a bulb, which is brown, between 7 and 15 cm in diameter, slightly elongated, and covered in thick, coarse fibers. The leaves grow from the base of the plant, and can be from 20 to 70 cm long and 6 to 25 mm wide. As the plant's name indicates, their edges are generally wavy, though this is not always particularly noticeable.

The flowers are borne on a long stem, normally longer than the leaves, and are from 15 to 30 mm long. The six petals (actually only three of them are petals in the technical sense; the other three are sepals) are up to 35 mm long and curving. They are typically white but have a noticeable mid-vein which can be purple or green. The six stamens are large and noticeable, and yellow or orange. The flowers are hermaphrodites (having both female and male parts).

They open only in the late afternoon or evening, remaining open during the night but closing by the morning. Pollination is by evening- or night-flying insects.

=== Subspecies ===
Three varieties are recognized:

- Chlorogalum pomeridianum var. divaricatum — endemic to some coastal regions of California (the Central Coast and southern parts of the North Coast), found only at elevations below about 100 metres (330 ft).
- Chlorogalum pomeridianum var. minus — endemic to the inner north and outer south Pacific Coast Ranges of California, and the San Francisco Bay Area. This variety has a less fibrous bulb than the others. On the CNPSInventory of Rare and Endangered Plants of California.
- Chlorogalum pomeridianum var. pomeridianum, Nomlaki language: shlā — found throughout the range of the species.

The basionym of the species was Scilla pomeridianum. It has also been known as Laothoe pomeridiana.

== Uses ==
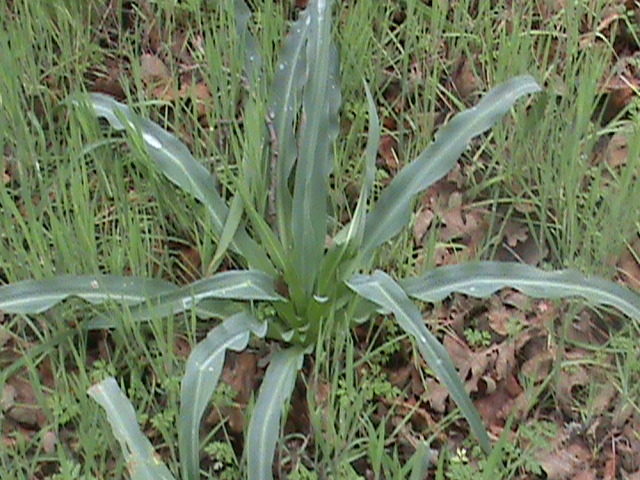
Soap plant growing in the forest

The fibers surrounding the bulb were widely used, bound together, to make small brushes. Extracts of the bulbs could also be used as a sealant or glue.

Cleansing

The juices of the bulb contain saponins that form a lather when mixed with water, and both Native American people (e.g. Miwok tribe) and early European settlers used the bulbs as a kind of soap; this is the origin of the plant's name. It was particularly used for washing hair, since it was held to be effective against dandruff.

Cuisine

The young leaves can be used as food, but the saponins in the bulbs make these poisonous. However saponins are very poorly absorbed by the body and usually pass straight through, and in any case they can be destroyed by thorough cooking. The Miwok people roasted and ate the bulbs as a winter food. In February 1847 Patrick Breen of the ill-fated Donner Party recorded that a Native American gave the starving settler some "roots resembling Onions in shape [that] taste some like a sweet potatoe [sic], all full of little tough fibres." Breen's son later called the roots "California soap-root"—almost certainly C. pomeridianum.

Saponins are much more toxic to some other animals than they are to humans. Fish are particularly susceptible, and the bulb juices were used to kill or stun them so they could be caught easily.

Medicinal

The bulbs also had various medicinal uses, both external (e.g., for making a poultice to be used as an antiseptic, or as a rub in cases of rheumatism) and internal (decoctions were used for a range of purposes, including as a diuretic, as a laxative and against stomachache).

== See also ==
- California chaparral and woodlands
