= Trichopetalum =

Trichopetalum may refer to:

- Trichopetalum (millipede), a genus of millipedes
- Trichopetalum (plant), a genus of plants
