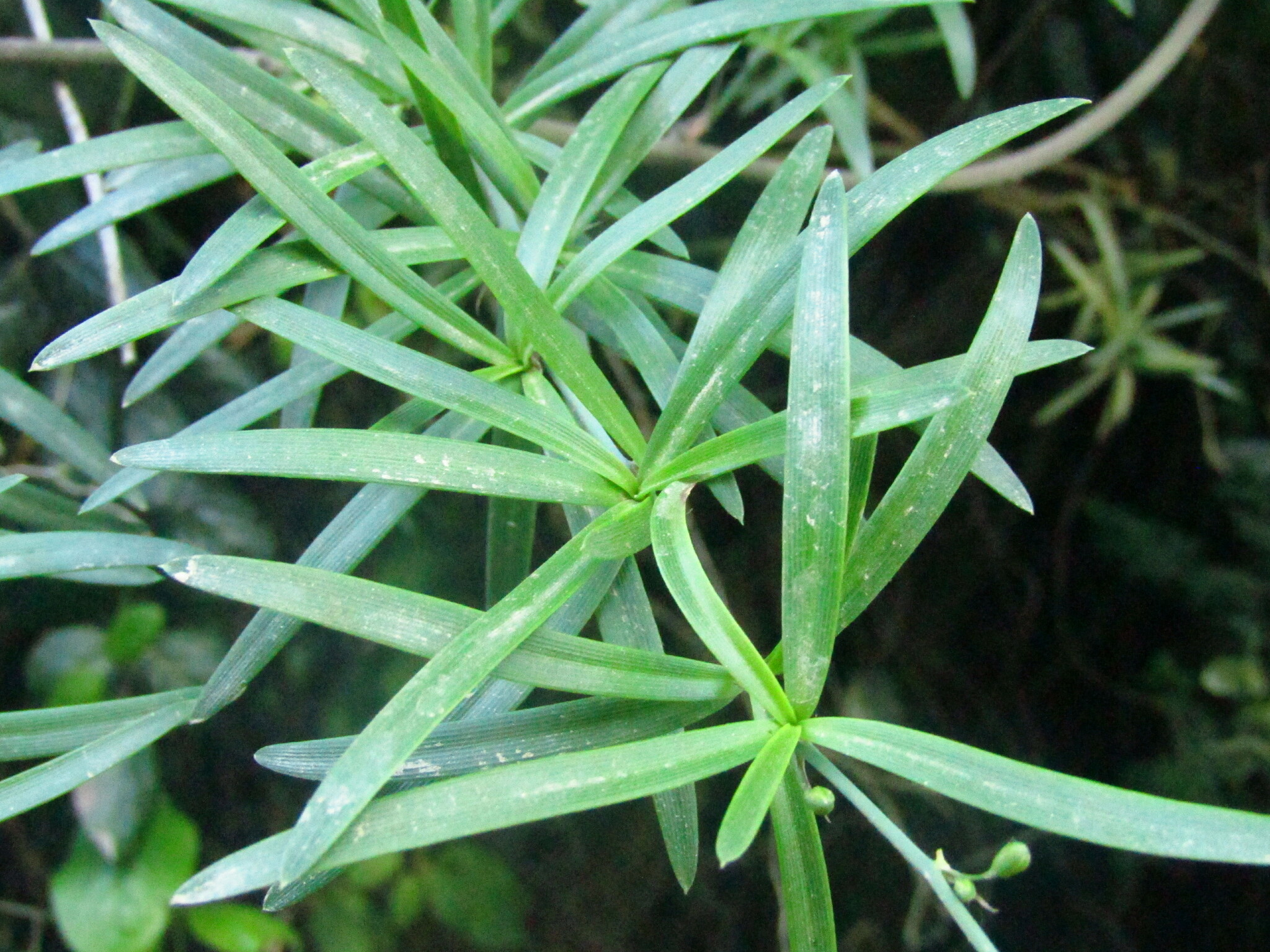

Scientific classification
- Kingdom: Plantae
- Clade: Tracheophytes
- Clade: Angiosperms
- Clade: Monocots
- Order: Asparagales
- Family: Asparagaceae
- Subfamily: Agavoideae
- Genus: Herreria
- Species: H. stellata

Binomial name
- Herreria stellata Ruiz & Pav.

Synonyms
- Herreria verticillata Molina

= Herreria stellata =

Species of plant

Herreria stellata is a species of flowering plant in the family Asparagaceae. It is a perennial climbing herb endemic to Chile, where it is found in the Maule, Biobío and Los Lagos regions. It is one of the three endemic species of Chile belonging to the Asparagaceae family, the others being Trichopetalum plumosum and Oziroe arida.

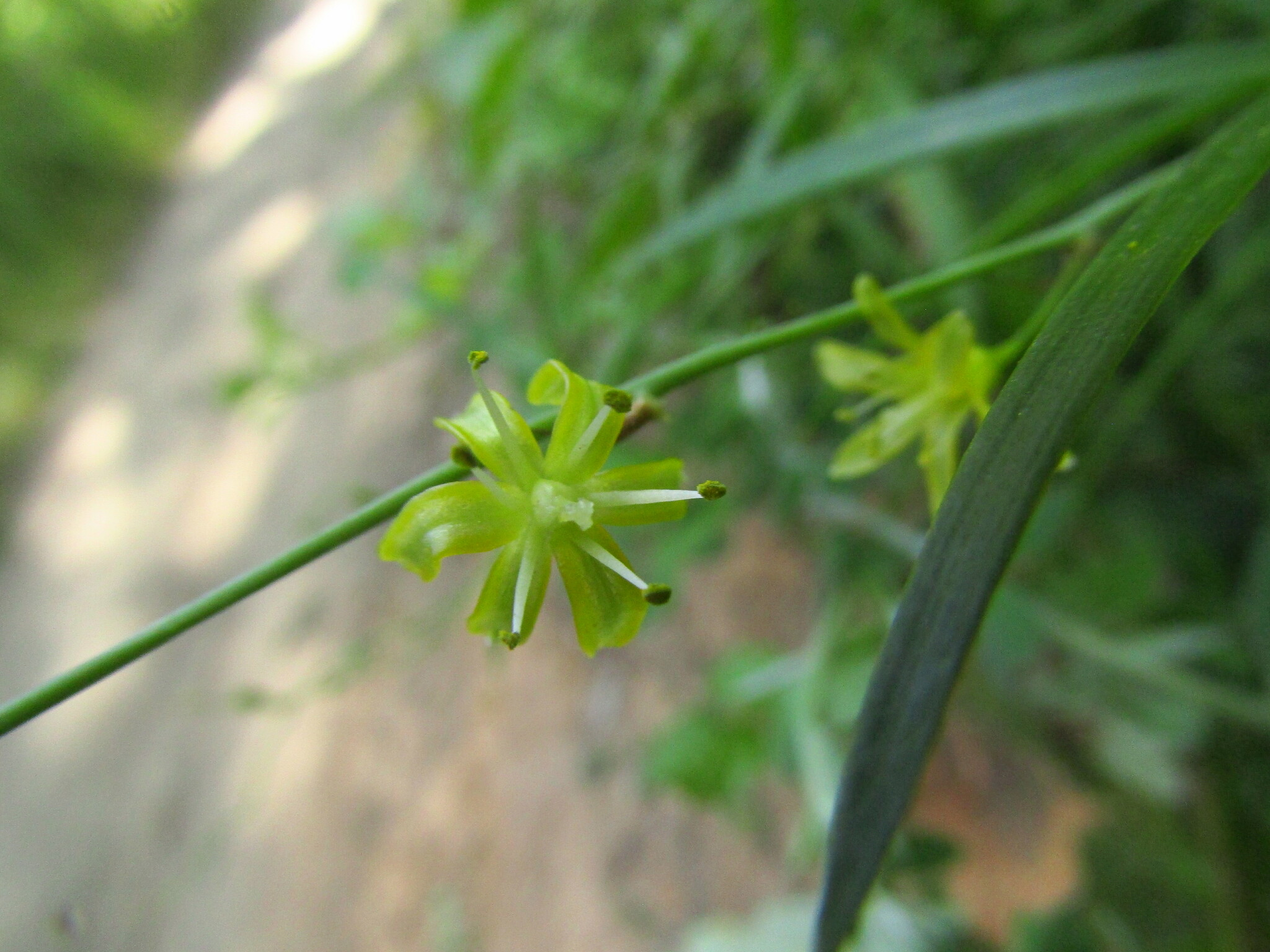
Detail of flower
