= Causeyella causeyae =

Scientific classification
- Domain: Eukaryota
- Kingdom: Animalia
- Phylum: Arthropoda
- Subphylum: Myriapoda
- Class: Diplopoda
- Order: Chordeumatida
- Family: Trichopetalidae
- Genus: Causeyella
- Species: C. causeyae

Binomial name
- Causeyella causeyae Shear, 2003

Species of millipede

Causeyella causeyae, Causey's cave millipede, is a millipede, ghostly white in color, which was first noticed, but not identified, in 1964. It was discovered in caves in Arkansas in 2004. It has been found in 10 caves in Izard, Independence, and Stone counties.
