= Trichopetalum dux =

Scientific classification
- Domain: Eukaryota
- Kingdom: Animalia
- Phylum: Arthropoda
- Subphylum: Myriapoda
- Class: Diplopoda
- Order: Chordeumatida
- Family: Trichopetalidae
- Genus: Trichopetalum
- Species: T. dux

Binomial name
- Trichopetalum dux (Chamberlain, 1940)

Species of millipede

Trichopetalum dux is a species of millipede in the family Trichopetalidae. It is endemic to Virginia in the United States.
