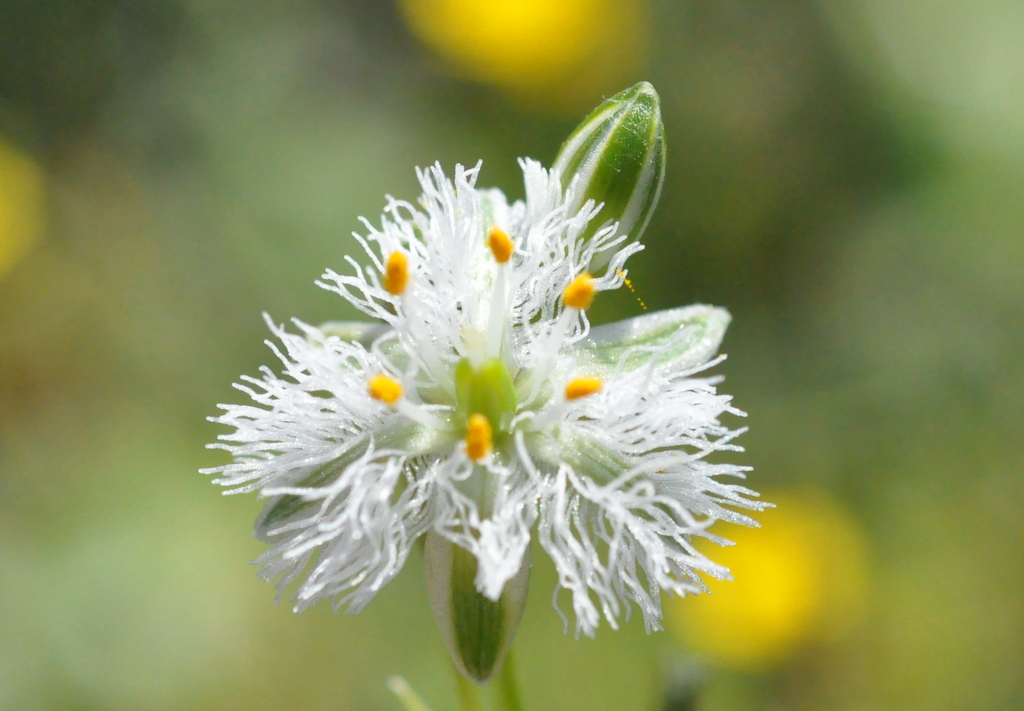

Scientific classification
- Kingdom: Plantae
- Clade: Tracheophytes
- Clade: Angiosperms
- Clade: Monocots
- Order: Asparagales
- Family: Asparagaceae
- Subfamily: Lomandroideae
- Genus: Trichopetalum
- Species: T. plumosum

Binomial name
- Trichopetalum plumosum (Ruiz & Pav.) J.F.Macbr.

Synonyms
- Anthericum plumosum Ruiz & Pav.; Endocoma peruviana Raf.; Bottionea thysanthoides Colla; Endocoma parviflora Raf.; Trichopetalum gracile Lindl.; Trichopetalum stellatum Lindl.

= Trichopetalum plumosum =

Species of plant

Trichopetalum plumosum is a species of flowering plant in the family Asparagaceae. It is one of the three members of this family that are endemic to Chile (the others being Herreria stellata and Oziroe arida). It is distributed between the Coquimbo and the Araucanía regions.
