= Trichopetalum uncum =

Scientific classification
- Domain: Eukaryota
- Kingdom: Animalia
- Phylum: Arthropoda
- Subphylum: Myriapoda
- Class: Diplopoda
- Order: Chordeumatida
- Family: Trichopetalidae
- Genus: Trichopetalum
- Species: T. uncum

Binomial name
- Trichopetalum uncum Cook & Collins, 1895

Species of millipede

Trichopetalum uncum is a species of millipede in the family Trichopetalidae. It is endemic to Indiana in the United States.
