= Causeyella youngsteadtorum =

Scientific classification
- Domain: Eukaryota
- Kingdom: Animalia
- Phylum: Arthropoda
- Subphylum: Myriapoda
- Class: Diplopoda
- Order: Chordeumatida
- Family: Trichopetalidae
- Genus: Causeyella
- Species: C. youngsteadtorum

Binomial name
- Causeyella youngsteadtorum Shear, 2003

Species of millipede

Causeyella youngsteadtorum, Youngsteadt's cave millipede, is a ghostly white millipede, first collected in 1976 by Norman and Jean Youngsteadt, but not recognized as a new species until 2003. It has been found in seven caves in Boone and Searcy counties in Arkansas.
