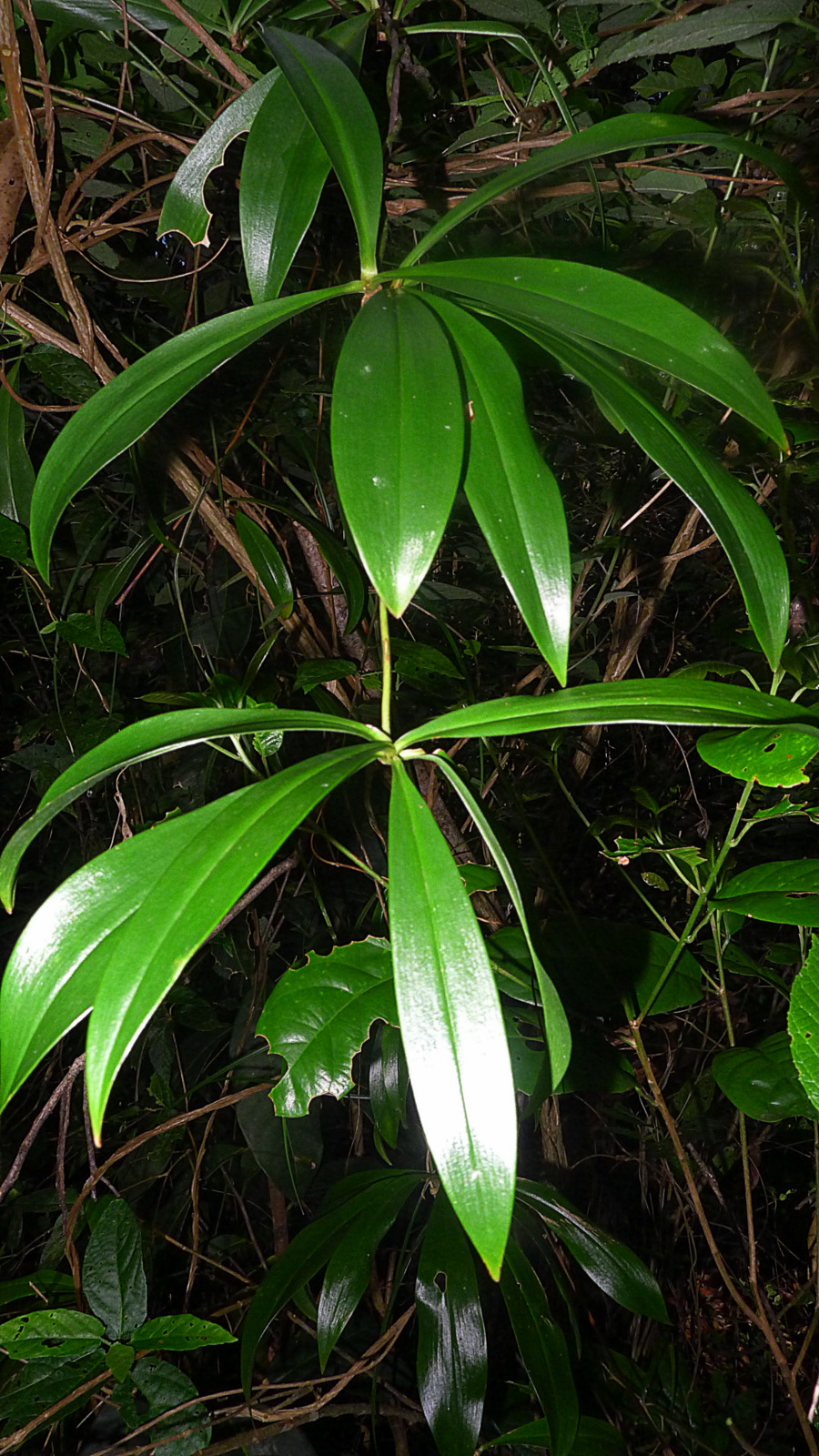
- Herreria glaziovii

Scientific classification
- Kingdom: Plantae
- Clade: Tracheophytes
- Clade: Angiosperms
- Clade: Monocots
- Order: Asparagales
- Family: Asparagaceae
- Subfamily: Agavoideae
- Genus: Herreria; Ruiz & Pav.

Type species
- Herreria stellata Ruiz & Pav.

Synonyms
- Salsa Feuillée ex Ruiz & Pav.

= Herreria (plant) =

Genus of flowering plants

Herreria is a genus of flowering plants native to South America. In the APG III classification system, the genus is placed in the family Asparagaceae, subfamily Agavoideae (formerly the family Agavaceae).

== Species ==
- Herreria bonplandii Lecomte - Argentina, Paraguay, Uruguay
- Herreria cipoana Ravenna - Minas Gerais
- Herreria glaziovii Lecomte - Bolivia, Brazil
- Herreria grandiflora Griseb. - Rio de Janeiro
- Herreria latifolia Woodson - Minas Gerais, Bolivia
- Herreria montevidensis Klotzsch ex Griseb. in C.F.P.von Martius - Argentina, Paraguay, Uruguay, Bolivia
- Herreria salsaparilha Mart. - Brazil
- Herreria stellata Ruiz & Pav. - Chile
