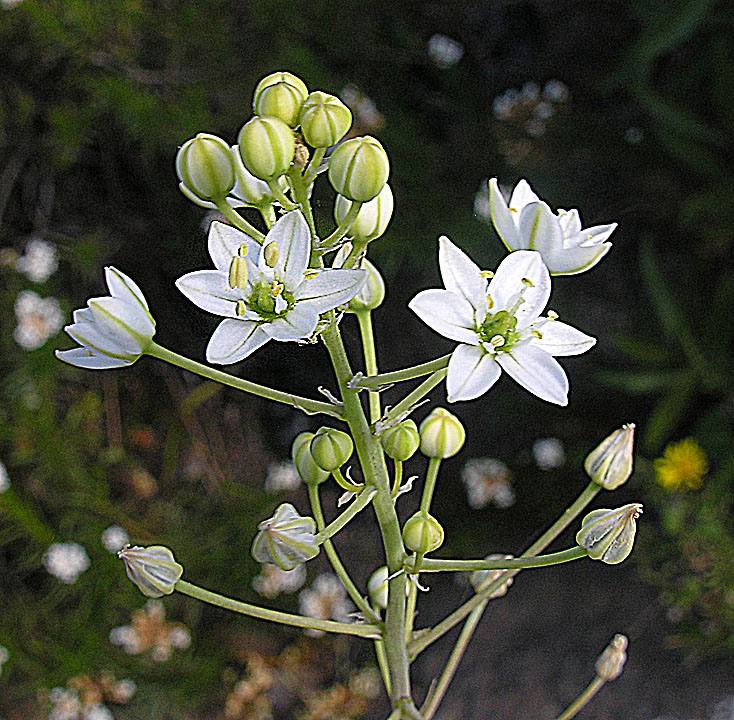
- Oziroe arida

Scientific classification
- Kingdom: Plantae
- Clade: Tracheophytes
- Clade: Angiosperms
- Clade: Monocots
- Order: Asparagales
- Family: Asparagaceae
- Subfamily: Scilloideae
- Genus: Oziroe; Raf.

Type species
- Oziroe leuchlora (syn of O. arida) Raf.

Synonyms
- Fortunatia J.F.Macbr.; Oziroë Raf., alternate spelling

= Oziroe =

Genus of flowering plants

Oziroe is a genus of bulbous South American plants in the squill subfamily within the asparagus family. Within the Scilloideae, it is the sole member of the tribe Oziroëeae and the only genus in the subfamily to be found in the New World.

== Description ==
Species of Oziroe grow from bulbs, which have contractile roots as well as normal ones. Each bulb produces only a few leaves, which are thick and grooved. The flowering stem (scape) appears at the same time as the leaves. It has bracts along its length, with generally one or two flowers on straight stalks (pedicels) appearing from the angle between each bract and the scape. The flowers have six whitish tepals about 6 cm (2.4 in) long which are joined for a short length at the base. Fertilized flowers produce black pear-shaped seeds up to 6–7 mm (0.2–0.3 in) long.

== Species ==
As of March 2013, the World Checklist of Selected Plant Families recognized five species:

1. Oziroe acaulis (Baker) Speta – Peru, Bolivia, Chile, Argentina
2. Oziroe argentinensis (Lillo & Hauman) Speta – Bolivia, Paraguay, Argentina
3. Oziroe arida (Poepp.) Speta – Chile; common name: "lagrimas de la Virgen"
4. Oziroe biflora (Ruiz & Pav.) Speta – Chile, Peru, Bolivia
5. Oziroe pomensis Ravenna – Peru, Bolivia, Chile, Argentina
