= Causeyella =

Scientific classification
- Kingdom: Animalia
- Phylum: Arthropoda
- Subphylum: Myriapoda
- Class: Diplopoda
- Order: Chordeumatida
- Family: Trichopetalidae
- Genus: Causeyella; Shear, 2003

Genus of millipedes

Causeyella, is a genus of millipedes comprising three species:

- Causeyella causeyae Shear, 2003
- Causeyella dendropus (Loomis, 1939)
- Causeyella youngsteadtorum Shear, 2003
