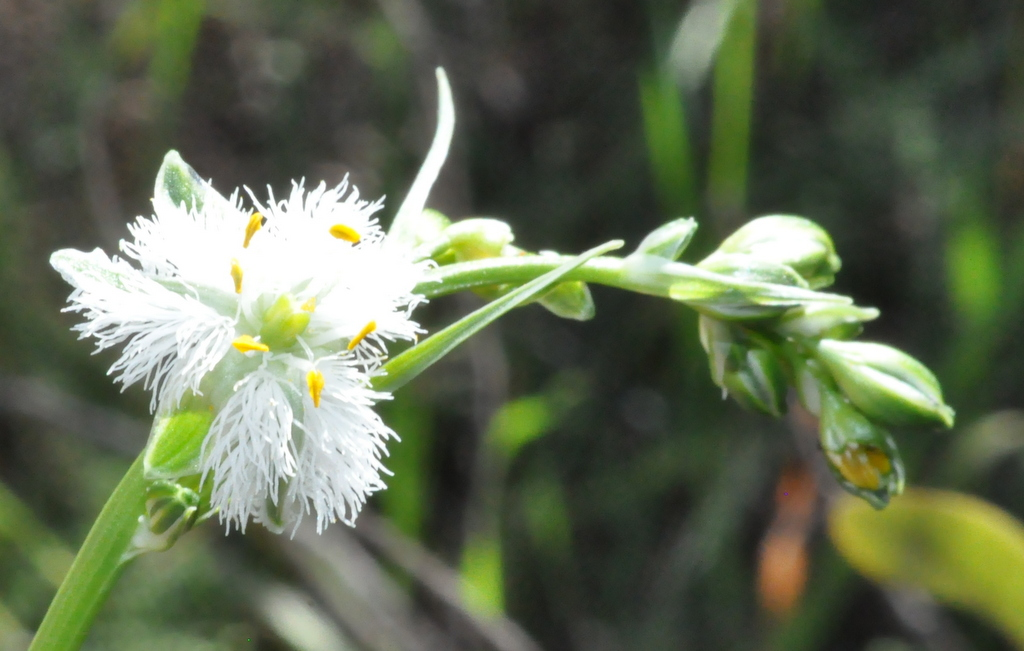
- Trichopetalum plumosum

Scientific classification
- Kingdom: Plantae
- Clade: Tracheophytes
- Clade: Angiosperms
- Clade: Monocots
- Order: Asparagales
- Family: Asparagaceae
- Subfamily: Lomandroideae
- Genus: Trichopetalum; Lindl.

Synonyms
- Endocoma Raf.; Bottionea Colla

= Trichopetalum (plant) =

Genus of flowering plants

Trichopetalum is a genus of flowering plants in the family Asparagaceae, subfamily Lomandroideae, native to southern South America.

The genus includes two species:

1. Trichopetalum chosmalensis Guagl. & Belgrano - Neuquén Province of Argentina
2. Trichopetalum plumosum (Ruiz & Pav.) J.F.Macbr. - Chile
