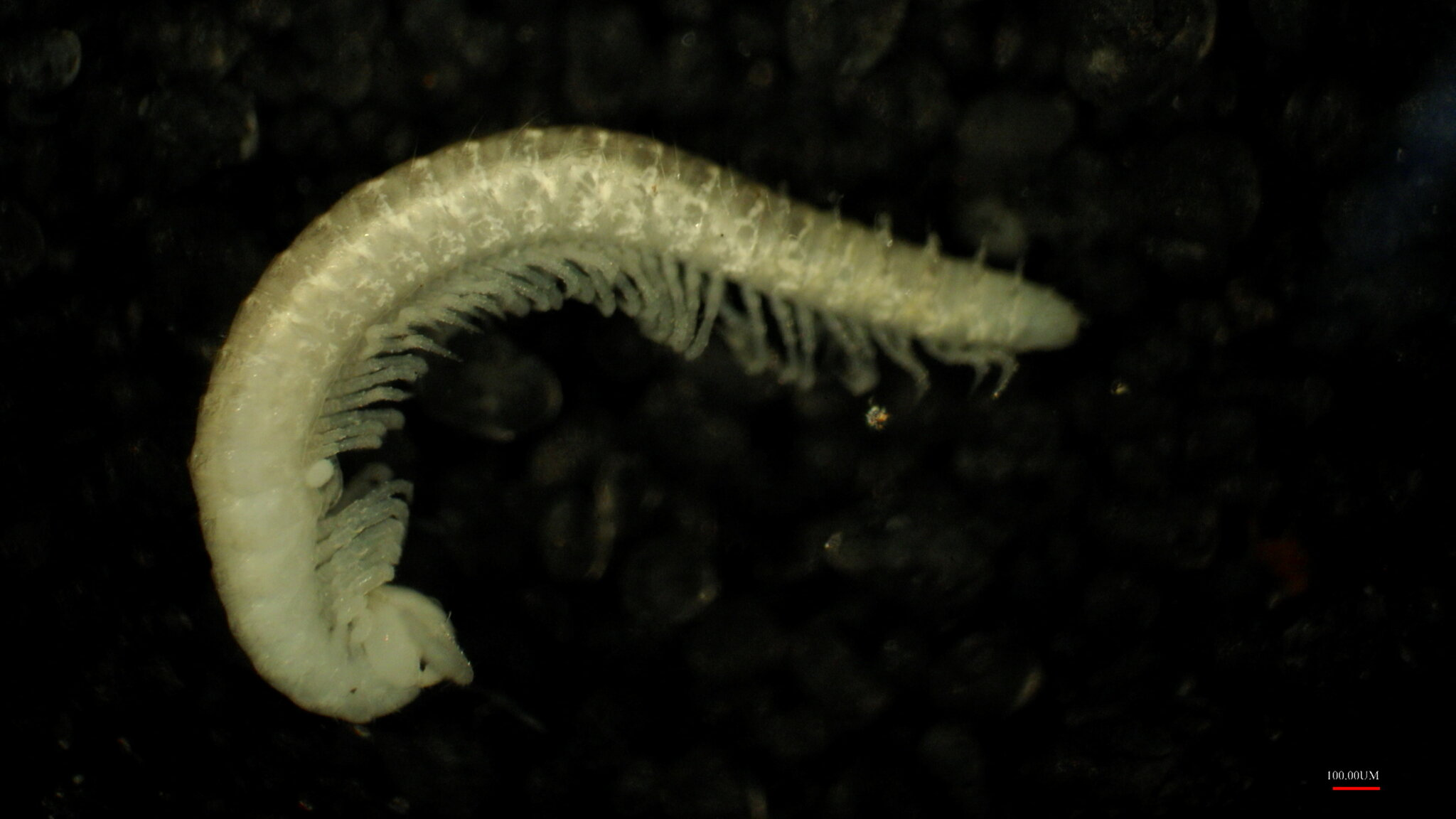
- Trichopetalum dickbrucei

Scientific classification
- Kingdom: Animalia
- Phylum: Arthropoda
- Subphylum: Myriapoda
- Class: Diplopoda
- Order: Chordeumatida
- Family: Trichopetalidae
- Subfamily: Trichopetalinae
- Genus: Trichopetalum; Harger, 1872

Type species
- Trichopetalum lunatum Harger, 1872

Synonyms
- Tynopus Chamberlin, 1940; Flagellopetalum Causey, 1951

= Trichopetalum (millipede) =

Genus of millipedes

Trichopetalum is a genus of chordeumatidan millipedes known from eastern North America.

== Species ==
The following species are recognised in the genus Trichopetalum:

- Trichopetalum dickbrucei Shear, 2010
- Trichopetalum dux (Chamberlin, 1940)
- Trichopetalum jerryblatti Shear, 2010
- Trichopetalum lunatum Harger, 1872
- Trichopetalum montis Chamberlin, 1951
- Trichopetalum stannardi (Causey, 1951)
- Trichopetalum uncum Cook & Collins, 1895
