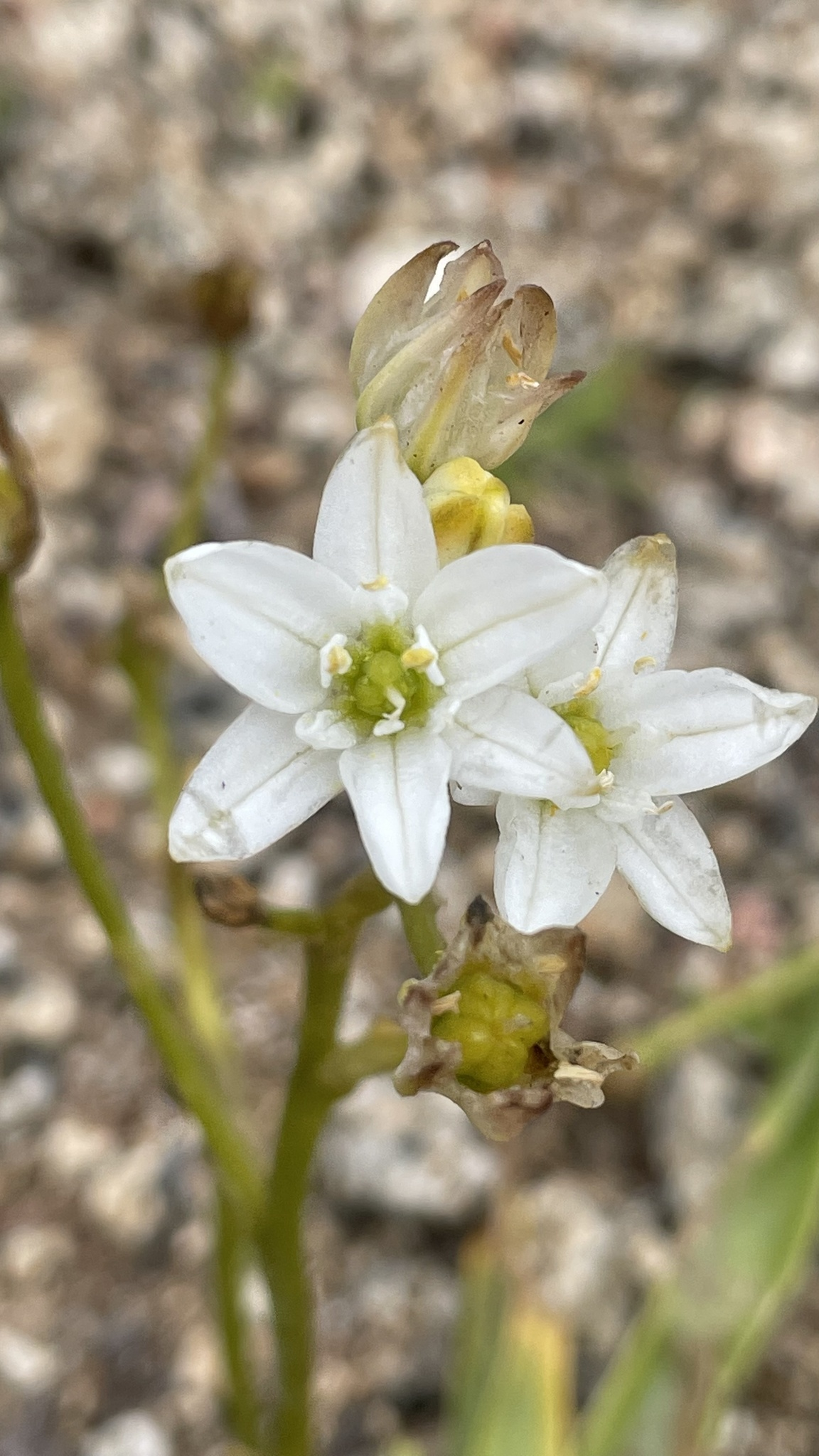

Scientific classification
- Kingdom: Plantae
- Clade: Tracheophytes
- Clade: Angiosperms
- Clade: Monocots
- Order: Asparagales
- Family: Asparagaceae
- Subfamily: Scilloideae
- Genus: Oziroe
- Species: O. arida

Binomial name
- Oziroe arida (Poepp.) Speta

= Oziroe arida =

Species of plant

Oziroe arida is a species of flowering plant in the family Asparagaceae. It is a perennial herb endemic to Chile, distributed between the Coquimbo and Araucanía regions.
