= Trichopetalidae =

Scientific classification
- Kingdom: Animalia
- Phylum: Arthropoda
- Subphylum: Myriapoda
- Class: Diplopoda
- Order: Chordeumatida
- Superfamily: Cleidogonoidea
- Family: Trichopetalidae; Verhoeff, 1914

Family of millipedes

Trichopetalidae is a family of millipedes in the order Chordeumatida. Adult millipedes in this family have 28 or 30 segments (counting the collum as the first segment and the telson as the last). There are 7 genera and at 43 species accepted in the family Trichopetalidae.

== Genera ==
The following genera are recognised in the family Trichopetalidae:

- Causeyella Shear, 2003
- Mexiterpes Causey, 1963
- Nannopetalum Shear, 2003
- Scoterpes Cope, 1872
- Trichopetalum Harger, 1872
- Trigenotyla Causey, 1951
- Zygonopus Ryder, 1881
