= Murchisonia =

Genus of flowering plants

Murchisonia was a genus of perennial herbs in the family Asparagaceae, subfamily Lomandroideae.

There were two known species. In 2016, both were recognized as closely related to Thysanotus species, therefore Murchisonia was merged into Thysanotus. The two recognized species were:

- Murchisonia fragrans Brittan – now Thysanotus fragrans (Brittan) Sirisena, Conran & T.Macfarlane, endemic to Western Australia
- Murchisonia volubilis Brittan – now Thysanotus exfimbriatus Sirisena, Conran & T.Macfarlane, native to Western Australia, South Australia and the Northern Territory
