= Wurmbea novae-zelandiae =

- Flower of Wurmbea novae-zelandiae

Conservation status
- Nationally Endangered (NZ TCS)

Scientific classification
- Kingdom: Plantae
- Clade: Tracheophytes
- Clade: Angiosperms
- Clade: Monocots
- Order: Liliales
- Family: Colchicaceae
- Genus: Wurmbea
- Species: W. novae-zelandiae

Binomial name
- Wurmbea novae-zelandiae (Hook.f. ex Kirk) Lekhak, Survesw. et S.R.Yadav

Synonyms
- Anguillaria novae-zelandiae Hook.f.; Iphigenia novae-zelandiae (Hook.f.) Baker

Species of flowering plant

Wurmbea novae-zelandiae is a species of flowering plant in the family Colchicaceae. A small cormous herb, it has thin linear leaves and white or slightly pink flowers. It is endemic to New Zealand, where it is primarily found in the South Island, although it has been reported once or twice in the North Island. Its 2023 conservation status in the New Zealand Threat Classification System was "Threatened – Nationally Endangered".

== Description ==
Wurmbea novae-zelandiae is a small cormous herb in the family Colchicaceae. They usually grow between 10 and 50 mm or 30–80 mm tall when flowering. The corm usually measures 7 × 5 mm. The stems are narrow and shorter than the leaves. Leaves are usually found in two or three pairs, they are linear, and typically measure 20–90 × 1–2 mm. Leaf-like bracts grow below the solitary flower at the tip of each stem.

The flowers have three to six, oblong-lance-shaped tepals, which are white or slightly pink in colour. The stamens (pollen-containing parts) are found at the base of the tepals. The capsules are oval, initially green and fleshy before becoming woody, and split into two to six spreading sections. The seeds are small, 1 mm in diameter, and orange to brown in colour. W. novae-zelandiae species has a diploid chromosome count of 20.

== Taxonomy ==
Wurmbea novae-zelandiae was first described in 1878 by Joseph Dalton Hooker and Thomas Kirk. It was first named Anguillaria novae-zelandiae by Hooker and Kirk. In 1879 it received the name Iphigenia novae-zelandiae from John Gilbert Baker. Phylogenetic studies, morphological features and revised taxonomic classifications support placing W. novae-zelandiae in the tribe Anguillarieae and the genus Wurmbea. W. novae-zelandiae is the only native New Zealand member of the family Colchicaceae.

=== Etymology ===
The genus name, Wurmbea, is named in honour of the German botanist Friedrich von Wurmb. The specific epithet (second part of the scientific name), novae-zelandiae, means "New Zealand".

== Distribution ==
Wurmbea novae-zelandiae is endemic to New Zealand. It is primarily found in the South Island, although it has been reported once or twice in the North Island in Hawke's Bay. In the South Island, it has been recorded from several locations east of the Southern Alps in Canterbury, Otago, and Southland. Its 2023 conservation status in the New Zealand Threat Classification System was "Threatened – Nationally Endangered".

=== Habitat ===
The plant is primarily found in lowland to subalpine environments. W. novae-zelandiae inhabits wetlands, damp seepages, the margins of tarns and lakes, moist areas among tussock grasslands, and depressions in gravelly alluvial deposits. W. novae-zelandiae has been recorded growing in association with Muehlenbeckia axillaris, Styphelia nesophila, Wahlenbergia albomarginata, among other plants.

== Ecology ==
Wurmbea novae-zelandiae's seed dispersal strategy is unknown. The seed dispersal systems in the family Colchicaceae are not well-studied either. The seed morphology of Colchicaceae are not associated with wind dispersal. However, the seed structures of some Colchicaceae, such as the fleshy fruits of the genus Disporum, suggest dispersal by animals, particularly ants and birds. Wurmbea species generally disperse their seeds close to their parent plants. Pollination of most or all genera in the family Colchicaceae is likely achieved by insects. The Australian species, W. dioica, uses bees, butterflies and flies for pollination.

== Works cited ==
Books

- Cheeseman, T. F. (1906). Manual of the New Zealand Flora (1 ed.). Wellington, New Zealand: Government of New Zealand.
- Nordenstam, B. (1998). "Flowering Plants · Monocotyledons". Colchicaceae. Berlin, Heidelberg: Springer Berlin Heidelberg. doi:10.1007/978-3-662-03533-7_24. ISBN 978-3-642-08377-8.

Journals

- Barrett, Spencer C. H. (2003). "Mating strategies in flowering plants: the outcrossing–selfing paradigm and beyond". Philosophical Transactions of the Royal Society. 358 (1434): 991–1004. doi:10.1098/rstb.2003.1301. ISSN 0962-8436.
- Barrett, Spencer C. H.; Case, Andrea L. (2006). "The ecology and evolution of gender strategies in plants: the example of Australian Wurmbea (Colchicaceae)". Australian Journal of Botany. 54 (5): 417–433. doi:10.1071/BT05151. ISSN 0067-1924.
- Case, Andrea L.; Graham, Sean W.; Macfarlane, Terry D.; Barrett, Spencer C. H. (2008). "A Phylogenetic Study of Evolutionary Transitions in Sexual Systems in Australasian Wurmbea (Colchicaceae)". International Journal of Plant Sciences. 169 (1): 141–156. doi:10.1086/523368. ISSN 1058-5893.
- Heenan, Peter B.; Macfarlane, Terry D.; Case, Andrea L.; Graham, Sean W.; Vinnersten, Annika; Mitchell, Caroline (2017). "Morphological and phylogenetic relationships of the threatened geophyte Wurmbea novae-zelandiae (Colchicaceae) from New Zealand, with notes on typification". Phytotaxa. 307 (2): 123–132. doi:10.11646/phytotaxa.307.2.3. ISSN 1179-3163.

Websites

- De Lange, Peter (2026). "Wurmbea novae-zelandiae". New Zealand Plant Conservation Network.
- "Wurmbea novae-zelandiae (Hook.f. ex Kirk) Lekhak, Survesw. & S.R.Yadav". Plants of the World Online – via Royal Botanic Gardens, Kew.
- "Wurmbea novae-zelandiae (Hook.f. ex Kirk) Lekhak, Survesw. & S.R.Yadav, J. Syst. Evol. 54(1): 81 (2015)". The Royal Botanic Gardens, Kew, Harvard University Herbaria & Libraries and Australian National Herbarium. International Plant Names Index. 2026.
