= Terry Desmond Macfarlane =

Australian botanist and taxonomist

Terry Desmond Macfarlane (born 1953) is a botanist and taxonomist, who has worked in both Australia and Peru. A senior research scientist at the Western Australian Herbarium, Macfarlane is associate editor of its journal Nuytsia and currently collaborates with researchers across Australia and in Canada, Germany, New Zealand, Russia, Spain and United Kingdom. He was also involved in the development of FloraBase, the Western Australian flora database.

The standard author abbreviation T.D.Macfarl. is used to indicate this person as the author when citing a botanical name.

== Names published ==
Macfarlane has published approximately 62 species.

- Anthericaceae Thysanotus exfimbriatus Sirisena, Conran & T.D.Macfarl. -- Nuytsia 27: 123. 2016 [1 Jul 2016] [published online]
  - Thysanotus fragrans (Brittan) Sirisena, Conran & T.D.Macfarl. -- Nuytsia 27: 122. 2016 [1 Jul 2016] [published online]
  - Thysanotus racemoides Sirisena, T.D.Macfarl. & Conran—Telopea 15: 206, figs 1-3. 2013 [15 Nov 2013] [published online]
  - Thysanotus unicupensis Sirisena, T.D.Macfarl. & Conran—Nuytsia 19(2): 260 (259-263; fig. 1). 2009 [17 Dec 2009]
  - Tricoryne soullierae T.D.Macfarl. & Keighery—Austral. Syst. Bot. 27(5-6): 417. 2015 [2014 publ. 29 Jun 2015]
  - Tricoryne tuberosa Keighery & T.D.Macfarl. -- Austral. Syst. Bot. 27(5-6): 416. 2015 [2014 publ. 29 Jun 2015]
- Colchicaceae Wurmbea biglandulosa (R.Br.) T.D.Macfarl. -- Brunonia 3(2): 191 (1980):. (IK)
  - Wurmbea biglandulosa subsp. flindersica R.J.Bates—J. Adelaide Bot. Gard. 16: 36. 1995 (IK)
  - Wurmbea calcicola T.D.Macfarl. -- Nuytsia 9(2): 233 (1993). (IK)
  - Wurmbea centralis T.D.Macfarl. -- Brunonia 1980 (APNI)
  - Wurmbea centralis subsp. australis R.J.Bates—J. Adelaide Bot. Gard. 16: 39. 1995 (IK)
  - Wurmbea cernua T.D.Macfarl. -- Brunonia 1980 (APNI)
  - Wurmbea densiflora (Benth.) T.D.Macfarl. -- Brunonia 3(2): 198 (1980):. (IK)
  - Wurmbea deserticola T.D.Macfarl. -- Brunonia 1980 (APNI)
  - Wurmbea dilatata T.D.Macfarl. -- Brunonia 3(2): 165 (1980). (IK)
  - Wurmbea dioica F.Muell. subsp. alba T.D.Macfarl. -- Brunonia 3(2): 164 (1980). (IK)
  - Wurmbea fluviatilis T.D.Macfarl. & A.L.Case—Nuytsia 21(1): 26 (-29; fig. 1, map). 2011 [24 Jun 2011]
  - Wurmbea graniticola T.D.Macfarl. -- Nuytsia 5(1) 1984 (APNI)
  - Wurmbea humilis T.D.Macfarl. -- Brunonia 1980 (APNI)
  - Wurmbea inflata T.D.Macfarl. & A.L.Case—Nuytsia 17: 223 (-228; fig. 1, map). 2007 [5 Dec 2007]
  - Wurmbea inframediana T.D.Macfarl. -- Brunonia 1980 (APNI)
  - Wurmbea latifolia T.D.Macfarl. -- Brunonia 1980 (APNI)
  - Wurmbea latifolia subsp. vanessae R.J.Bates—J. Adelaide Bot. Gard. 16: 48. 1995 (IK)
  - Wurmbea monantha (Endl.) T.D.Macfarl. -- Brunonia 3(2): 167 (1980):. (IK)
  - Wurmbea murchisoniana T.D.Macfarl. -- Nuytsia 5(3) 1986 (APNI)
  - Wurmbea odorata T.D.Macfarl. -- Brunonia 1980 (APNI)
  - Wurmbea saccata T.D.Macfarl. & S.J.van Leeuwen—Nuytsia 10(3): 429 (1996). (IK)
  - Wurmbea sinora T.D.Macfarl. -- Brunonia 3(2): 196 (1980). (IK)
  - Wurmbea uniflora (R.Br.) T.D.Macfarl. -- Brunonia 1980 (APNI)
- Haemodoraceae subfam. Conostylidoideae T.D.Macfarl. & Hopper—Fl. Australia 45: 454. 1987 [15 May 1987] (IK)
- Haemodoraceae trib. Tribonantheae T.D.Macfarl. & Hopper—Fl. Australia 45: 454, 131. 1987 [15 May 1987] (IK)
- Haemodoraceae Haemodorum basalticum R.L.Barrett, Hopper & T.D.Macfarl. -- Nuytsia 26: 114. 2015 [3 Nov 2015] [published online]
  - Haemodorum discolor T.D.Macfarl. -- Flora of Australia 45 1987
  - Haemodorum gracile T.D.Macfarl. -- Flora of Australia 45 1987
  - Haemodorum loratum T.D.Macfarl. -- Flora of Australia 45 1987
  - Haemodorum venosum T.D.Macfarl. -- Flora of Australia 45 1987
  - Phlebocarya pilosissima subsp. teretifolia T.D.Macfarl. -- Flora of Australia 45 1987 (APNI)
  - Tribonanthes purpurea T.D.Macfarl. & Hopper—Flora of Australia 45 1987 (APNI)
- Hydatellaceae Trithuria austinensis D.D.Sokoloff, Remizowa, T.D.Macfarl. & Rudall—Taxon 57(1): 192 (-193; figs., map). 2008 [28 Feb 2008]
  - Trithuria australis (Diels) D.D.Sokoloff, Remizowa, T.D.Macfarl. & Rudall—Taxon 57(1): 193. 2008 [28 Feb 2008]
  - Trithuria cookeana D.D.Sokoloff, Remizowa, T.D.Macfarl. & Rudall—Taxon 57(1): 193 (195; figs., map). 2008 [28 Feb 2008]
  - Trithuria polybracteata D.A.Cooke ex D.D.Sokoloff, Remizowa, T.D.Macfarl. & Rudall—Taxon 57(1): 196 (figs., map). 2008 [28 Feb 2008]
- Loganiaceae Logania sylvicola Cranfield, Hislop & T.D.Macfarl. -- Nuytsia 20: 272 (271-275; figs. 2-3, map). 2010 [29 Sep 2010]
- Lomandraceae Chamaexeros longicaulis T.D.Macfarl. -- Nuytsia 9(3): 375 (1994). (IK)
  - Lomandra integra T.D.Macfarl. -- Nuytsia 5(1): 21 (1984). (IK)
  - Lomandra marginata T.D.Macfarl. & Conran—Austral. Syst. Bot. 27(5-6): 422. 2015 [2014 publ. 29 Jun 2015]
  - Lomandra multiflora subsp. dura (F.Muell.) T.D.Macfarl. -- Flora of Australia 46 1986 (APNI)
  - Lomandra nigricans T.D.Macfarl. -- Nuytsia 5(1) 1984 (APNI)
  - Lomandra nutans T.D.Macfarl. -- Nuytsia 5(1) 1984 (APNI)
  - Lomandra teres T.D.Macfarl. -- Fl. Australia 46: 224, 106. 1986 [2 May 1986] (IK)
- Poaceae Poa sect. Tovarochloa (T.D.Macfarl. & But) Molinari—Polish Bot. J. 60(1): 68. 2015 [11 Jul 2015] [published online]
- Poaceae trib. Amphipogoneae L.Watson & T.D.Macfarl. -- Fl. Australia 43(1): 373. 2002 [28 Aug 2002] (IK)
- Poaceae Amphipogon laguroides R.Br. subsp. havelii T.D.Macfarl. -- Fl. Australia 43(1): 374. 2002 [28 Aug 2002] (IK)
  - Amphipogon sericeus (Vickery) T.D.Macfarl. -- Fl. Australia 43(1): 375. 2002 [28 Aug 2002] (IK)
  - Neurachne annularis T.D.Macfarl. -- Nuytsia 17: 217 (215-222; fig. 2, map). 2007 [5 Dec 2007]
  - Tovarochloa T.D.Macfarl. & But—Brittonia 34(4): 478 (1982). (IK)
  - Tovarochloa T.D.Macfarl. & But—Brittonia 34(4): 478. 1982 [17 Dec 1982] (GCI)
  - Tovarochloa peruviana T.D.Macfarl. & But—Brittonia 34(4): 478 (1982). (IK)
- Proteaceae Petrophile vana Cranfield & T.D.Macfarl. -- Nuytsia 17: 154 (153-157; fig. 1, map). 2007 [5 Dec 2007]
- Solanaceae Anthocercis sylvicola T.D.Macfarl. & Ward.-Johnson—Nuytsia 11(1): 71 (1996). (IK)
- Zannichelliaceae Althenia hearnii T.D.Macfarl. & D.D.Sokoloff—Phytotaxa 317(1): 54. 2017 [11 Aug 2017] [published online]
  - Althenia patentifolia (E.L.Robertson) T.D.Macfarl. & D.D.Sokoloff—Phytotaxa 317(1): 58. 2017 [11 Aug 2017] [published online]

== Selected publications ==
- Macfarlane, T.D. 1984. "Taxonomic clarification of the Lomandra odora group (Xanthorrhoeaceae or Dasypogonaceae)" (PDF). Nuytsia. 5 (1): 13–24.
- Macfarlane, T.D. 1984. "Lomandra nutans (Xanthorrhoeaceae or Dasypogonaceae), a new species from the Stirling Range area, Western Australia" (PDF). Nuytsia. 5 (1): 171–175.
- Macfarlane, T.D. 1986. "Two new species of Wurmbea (Colchicaceae or Liliaceae s. lat.) from south-western Australia". Nuytsia. 5 (3): 407–414.
- Macfarlane, T.D. 1993. "Wurmbea calcicola (Colchicaceae), a new species from Cape Naturaliste, south western Australia" (PDF). Nuytsia. 9 (2): 233–236.
- Macfarlane, T.D. 1994. "Chamaexeros longicaulis (Dasypogonaceae), a new species from Walpole, south western Australia, with additional notes on Chamaexeros" (PDF). Nuytsia. 9 (3): 375–382.
