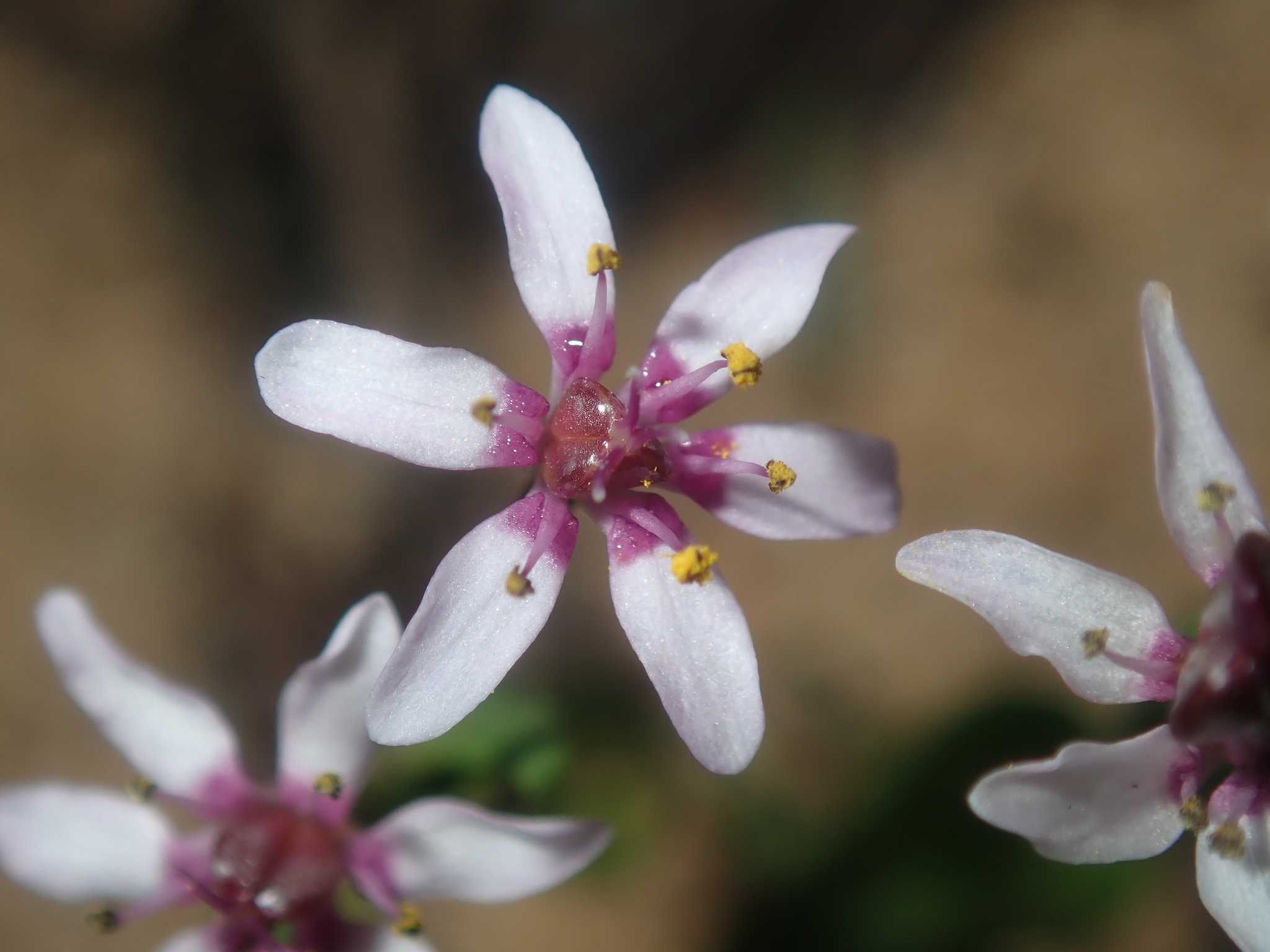

Scientific classification
- Kingdom: Plantae
- Clade: Embryophytes
- Clade: Tracheophytes
- Clade: Spermatophytes
- Clade: Angiosperms
- Clade: Monocots
- Order: Liliales
- Family: Colchicaceae
- Genus: Wurmbea
- Species: W. monantha

Binomial name
- Wurmbea monantha (Endl.) T.D.Macfarl.

Synonyms
- Anguillaria monantha Endl.

= Wurmbea monantha =

Species of flowering plant

Wurmbea monantha is a perennial herb that is native to Western Australia. The white to pink flowers are produced between July and September in its native range.

The species was first formally described in 1846 by Austrian botanist Stephen Endlicher in Plantae Preissianae, based on plant material collected from Perth. He gave it the name Anguillaria monantha. The species was transferred to the genus Wurmbea in 1980 by Terry Macfarlane.

The specific epithet, monantha, is a Botanical Latin adjective, monanthus, -a, -um, which describes the plant as being "one-flowered".
