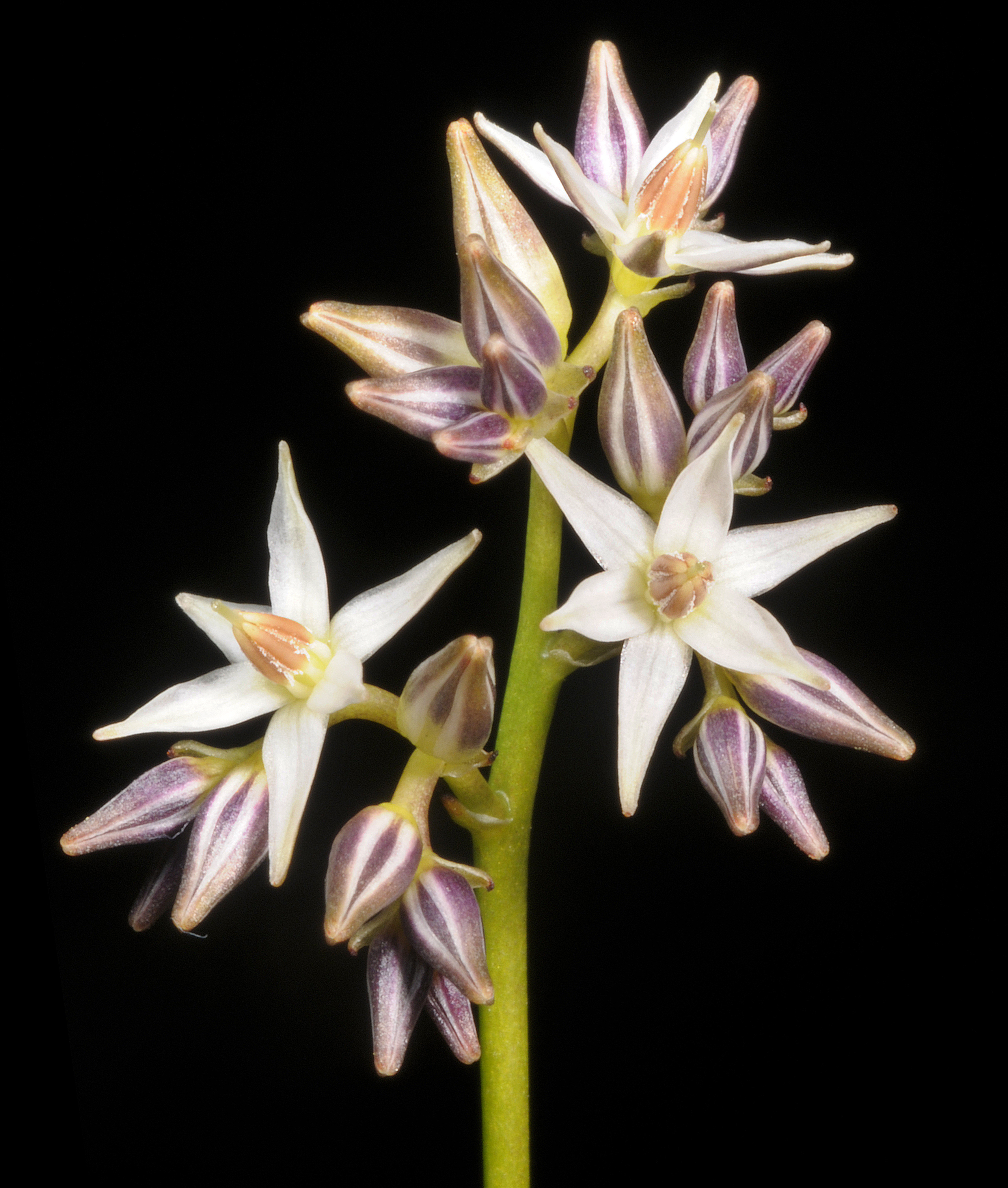

Scientific classification
- Kingdom: Plantae
- Clade: Tracheophytes
- Clade: Angiosperms
- Clade: Monocots
- Clade: Commelinids
- Order: Commelinales
- Family: Haemodoraceae
- Genus: Phlebocarya
- Species: P. filifolia

Binomial name
- Phlebocarya filifolia (F.Muell.) Benth.
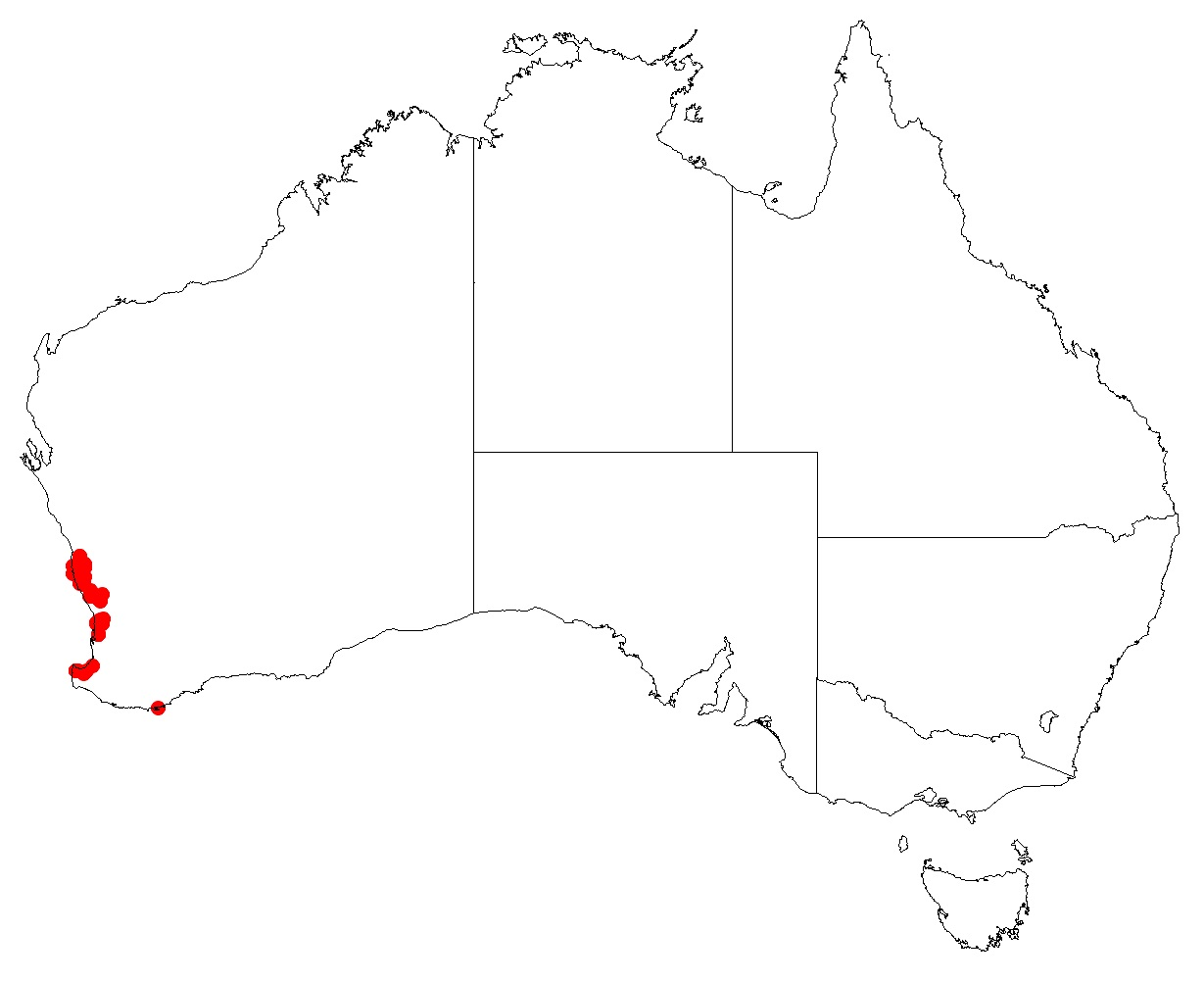
- occurrence data from AVH

Synonyms
- Phlebocarya ciliata var. filifolia F.Muell.

= Phlebocarya filifolia =

Species of flowering plant

Phlebocarya filifolia is a plant in the Haemodoraceae family, native to Western Australia.

== Description ==
Phlebocarya filifolia has flat leaves (occasionally terete). The leaf blade is 25–40 cm by 0.6-1.8 mm. The leaf margins are fringed but sometimes only on the apical or basal part. The sheath is hairy. The flower head can be slightly shorter to considerably longer than the leaves. The scape, the bracts and the pedicels are glabrous. The style is simple and there is one stigma.

It flowers from October to December, and is found on sandy soils in shrublands and eucalypt woodlands.

== Taxonomy ==
The plant was first described as Phlebocarya ciliata var filifolia by Ferdinand von Mueller in 1873, but later in 1873 George Bentham erected it to the species Phlebocarya filifolia.

== Etymology ==
The species epithet, filifolia, is an adjective derived from the Latin, filum ("thread) and folium ("leaf") and thus describes the plant as having thread-like leaves.
