= Wurmbea inflata =

Scientific classification
- Kingdom: Plantae
- Clade: Embryophytes
- Clade: Tracheophytes
- Clade: Spermatophytes
- Clade: Angiosperms
- Clade: Monocots
- Order: Liliales
- Family: Colchicaceae
- Genus: Wurmbea
- Species: W. inflata

Binomial name
- Wurmbea inflata T.D.Macfarl. & A.L.Case

Species of flowering plant

Wurmbea inflata is a species of plant in the Colchicaceae family that is endemic to Australia. The specific epithet inflata (‘bladdery’) refers to the enlarged fruits.

== Description ==
The species is a cormous perennial herb that grows to a height of 5–15 cm. Its sweet-scented pink or white flowers appear from May to June in years when there has been sufficient rainfall.

== Distribution and habitat ==
The species is found in the Carnarvon and Gascoyne IBRA bioregions of western Western Australia. It grows on shallow or sparse red loam soils on banded ironstones on the slopes of rocky hills.
