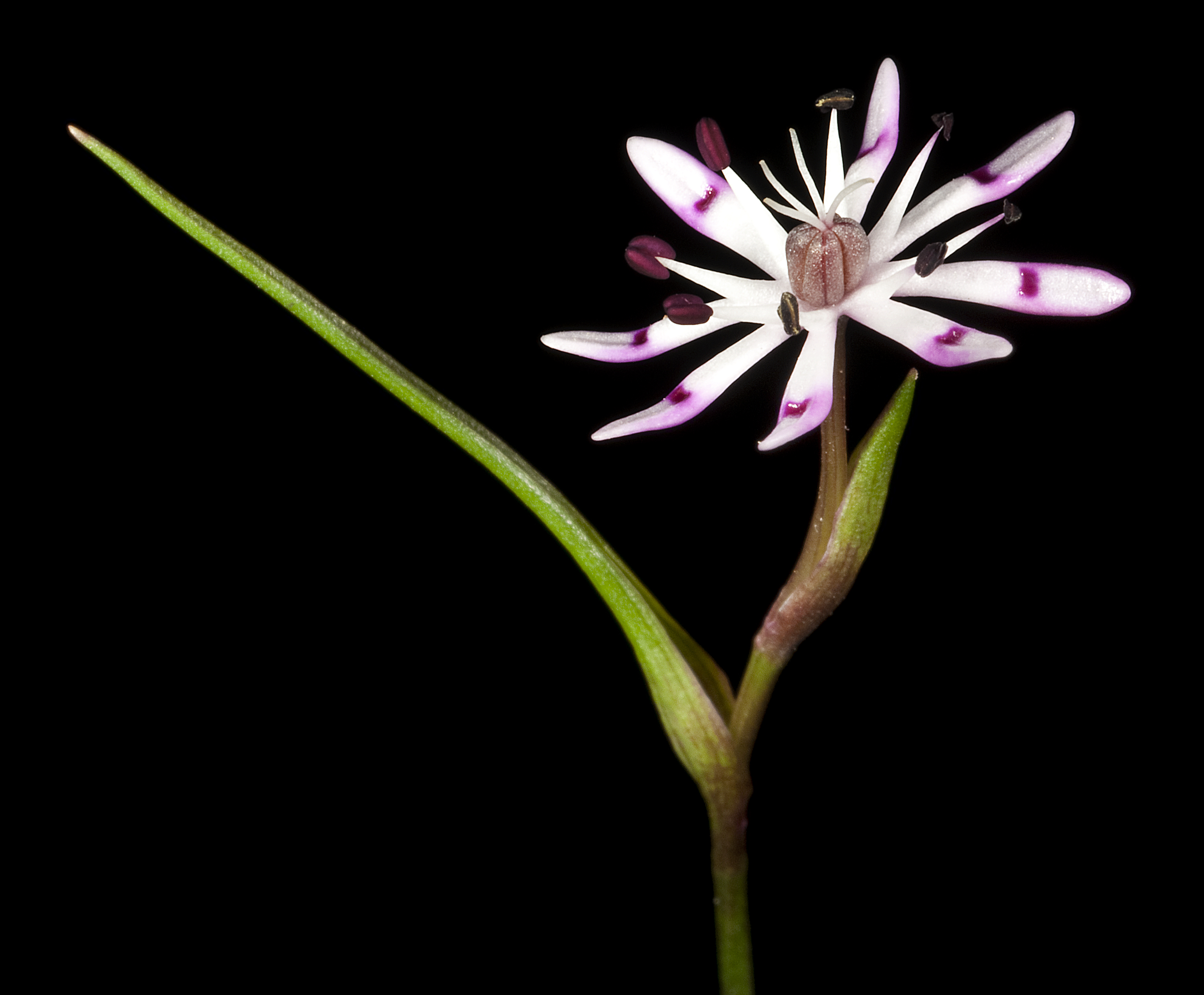
- Wurmea tenella (photo K.R.Thiele)
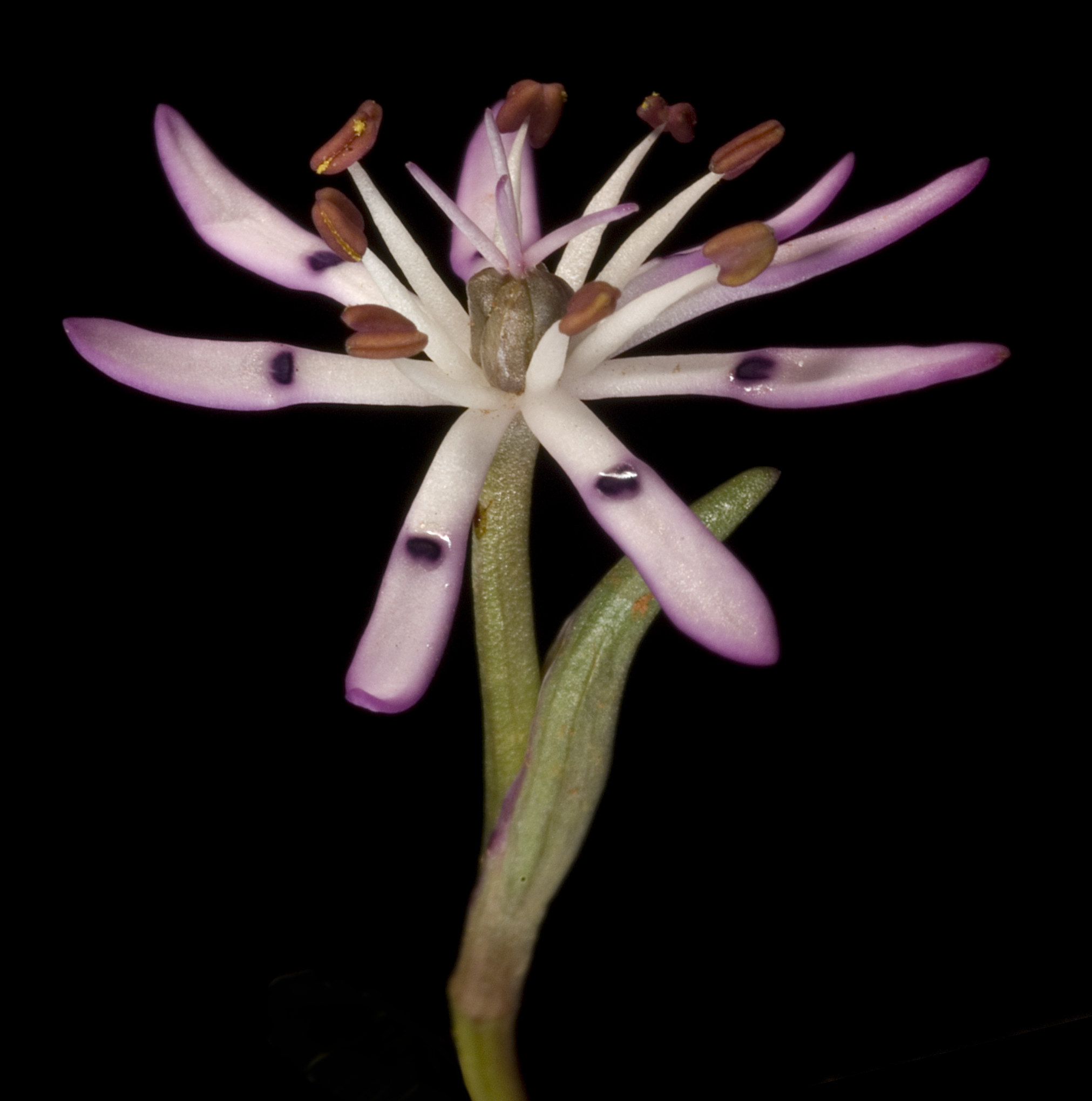

Scientific classification
- Kingdom: Plantae
- Clade: Embryophytes
- Clade: Tracheophytes
- Clade: Spermatophytes
- Clade: Angiosperms
- Clade: Monocots
- Order: Liliales
- Family: Colchicaceae
- Genus: Wurmbea
- Species: W. tenella

Binomial name
- Wurmbea tenella (Endl.) Benth.

Synonyms
- Anguillaria tenella Endl.

= Wurmbea tenella =

Species of flowering plant

Wurmbea tenella, common name - eight nancy, is a perennial herb in the Colchicaceae family that is native to Western Australia.

== Description ==
Wurmbea tenella grows to 10 cm tall. It has three well separated leaves (or the upper two may be close together below the flower). It has one bisexual flower (occasionally two). The perianth is 6 to 7 mm long with usually 6, 7 or 8 tepals. These are joined for less than a fifth of their length, and are white, often with a pink flushing. The stamens are about 2/3 the length of the perianth. The purple or red anthers are about 1 mm long, and the styles are free.

== Habitat ==
It grows in places which are seasonally wet, often on or near granite outcrops, but is also found on sandy plains, on salty red loam amongst chenopods, on limestone plains and in eucalypt woodlands.

== Taxonomy & naming ==
The species was first formally described in 1846 by Austrian botanist Stephen Endlicher in Plantae Preissianae, based on plant material found in the "damp and muddy sanddunes of the Swan River near the town of Perth". He gave it the name Anguillaria tenella. The species was transferred to the genus Wurmbea in 1878 by George Bentham.

The specific epithet, tenella, is a Latin adjective (tenellus, -a, -um) which describes the plant as "delicate".

== Conservation status ==
Wurmbea tenella is classified as "not threatened" by the Western Australian Government Department of Parks and Wildlife.
