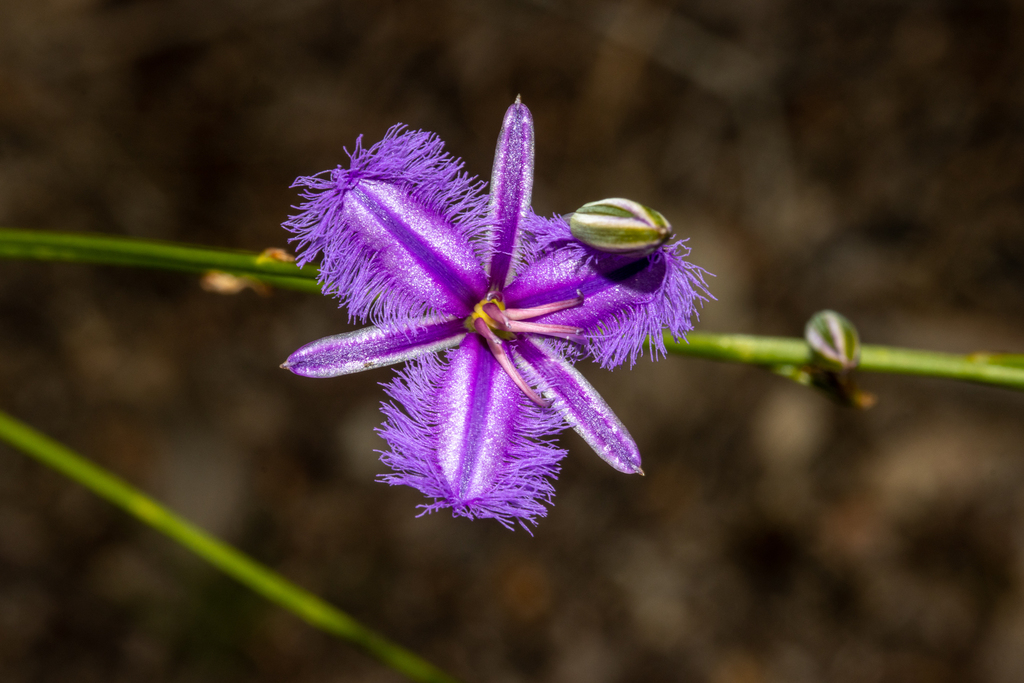
- Near Blewitt Springs

Scientific classification
- Kingdom: Plantae
- Clade: Tracheophytes
- Clade: Angiosperms
- Clade: Monocots
- Order: Asparagales
- Family: Asparagaceae
- Subfamily: Lomandroideae
- Genus: Thysanotus
- Species: T. racemoides

Binomial name
- Thysanotus racemoides Sirisena, T.D.Macfarl. & Conran

= Thysanotus racemoides =

Species of plant

Thysanotus racemoides is a species of flowering plant in the Asparagaceae family, and is endemic to south-eastern continental Australia. It is a perennial herb with a rhizomatous, more or less cylindrical rootstock, fibrous roots, few leaves or leafless, flowers arranged in pairs, with pink to mauve perianth segments, fringed petals and six stamens of differing lengths.

== Description ==
Thysanotus racemoides is a perennial herb with a rhizomatous, horizontal, more or less cylindrical rootstock, and fibrous roots. Leaves are often absent, or a few, subterete leaves 60–80 mm (2.4–3.1 in) long at the base of the plant. The flowers are usually borne in pairs in umbels, rarely in groups of up to four, each flower on an erect pedicel, 5–6 mm (0.20–0.24 in) long. The perianth segments are pink to mauve, 12–15 mm (0.47–0.59 in) long. The petals have a fringe 3–4 mm (0.12–0.16 in) long and there are six stamens, the outer three anthers, 3–6 mm (0.12–0.24 in) long, the inner three 4 mm (0.16 in) long. The style is curved, 6–12 mm (0.24–0.47 in) long. Flowering occurs from November to January, and the capsules are more or less spherical, about 4–7 mm (0.16–0.28 in) long and 3–5 mm (0.12–0.20 in) in diameter, the seeds with a straw-coloured aril.

== Taxonomy ==
Thysanotus racemoides was first formally described in 2013 by Udani Sirisena, Terry Macfarlane and John Conran in the journal Telopea from specimens collected near Coles in 1963. The specific epithet (racemoides) refers to the sessile umbels that resemble a raceme.

== Distribution and habitat ==
This species of Thysanotus is restricted to the deep sands of inland western Victoria, eastern South Australia and the sandplains and lateritic gravels of Kangaroo Island, in a wide range of habitats from dry forest to woodland and low heath. In Victoria it occurs in the Big Desert and Grampians and near Anglesea.
