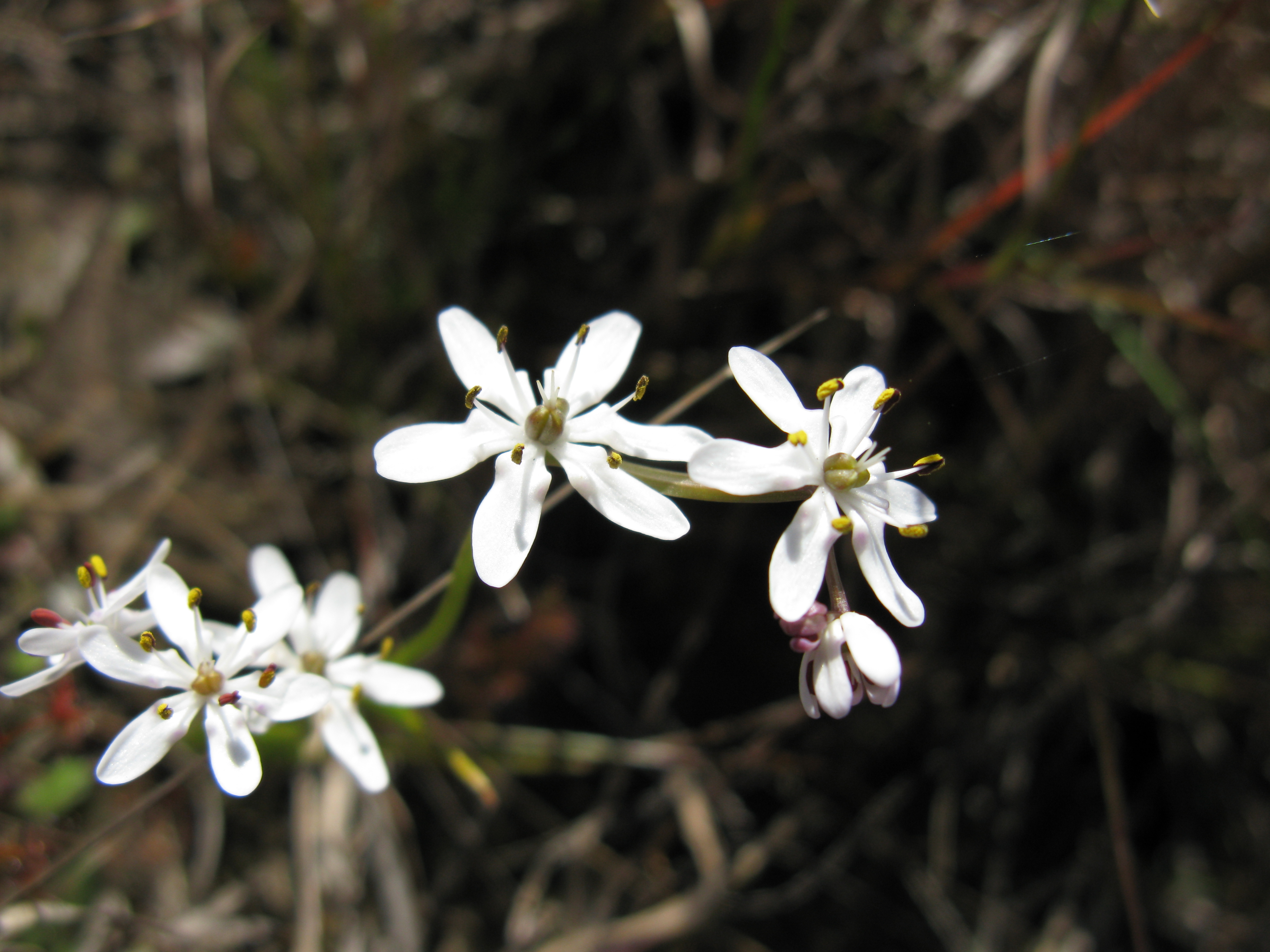
- Wurmbea biglandulosa flowers

Scientific classification
- Kingdom: Plantae
- Clade: Embryophytes
- Clade: Tracheophytes
- Clade: Spermatophytes
- Clade: Angiosperms
- Clade: Monocots
- Order: Liliales
- Family: Colchicaceae
- Genus: Wurmbea
- Species: W. biglandulosa

Binomial name
- Wurmbea biglandulosa (R.Br.) T.D.Macfarl.

Synonyms
- Anguillaria biglandulosa R.Br.

= Wurmbea biglandulosa =

Species of flowering plant

Wurmbea biglandulosa is a species of plant in the Colchicaceae family that is endemic to Australia.

== Subspecies ==
- Wurmbea biglandulosa subsp. biglandulosa (R.Br.) T.D.Macfarl.
- Wurmbea biglandulosa subsp. flindersica R.J.Bates

== Description ==
The species is a cormous perennial herb that grows to a height of 3.5–30 cm. Its white flowers appear in spring.

== Distribution and habitat ==
The species is found in south-eastern Australia in New South Wales, South Australia, Victoria and Queensland. It grows in forest and disturbed grassland, and on creek banks and rocky ridges.
