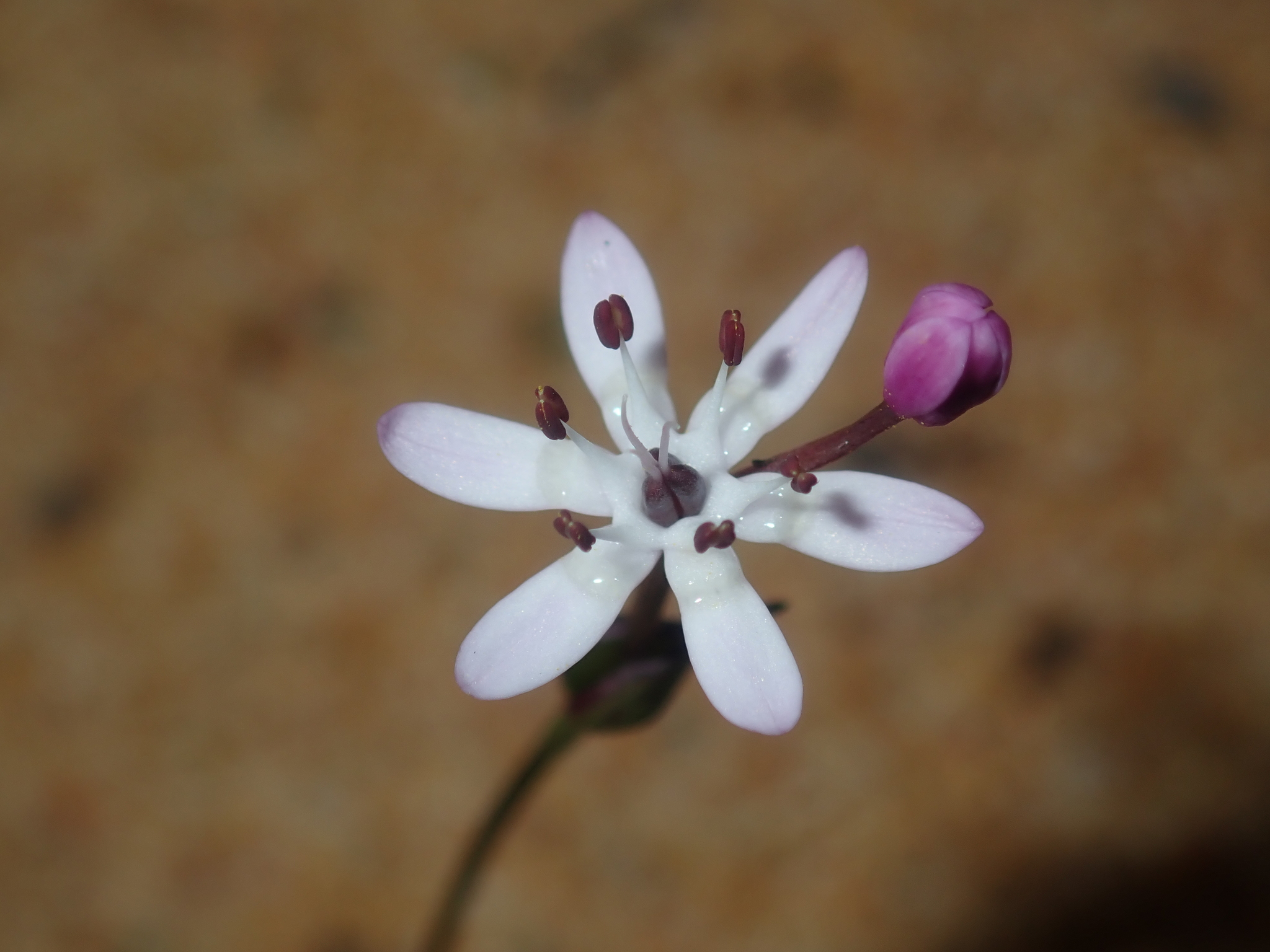

Scientific classification
- Kingdom: Plantae
- Clade: Embryophytes
- Clade: Tracheophytes
- Clade: Spermatophytes
- Clade: Angiosperms
- Clade: Monocots
- Order: Liliales
- Family: Colchicaceae
- Genus: Wurmbea
- Species: W. dilatata

Binomial name
- Wurmbea dilatata T.D.Macfarl.

= Wurmbea dilatata =

Species of flowering plant

Wurmbea dilatata is a species of plant in the family Colchicaceae. It is endemic to Australia.

== Description ==
The species is a cormous perennial herb that grows to a height of 5–12 cm. Its pink and white flowers appear in August.

== Distribution and habitat ==
The species is found in the Avon Wheatbelt, Geraldton Sandplains and Swan Coastal Plain IBRA bioregions of western Western Australia. It grows in white, yellow and grey sands and clay soils.
