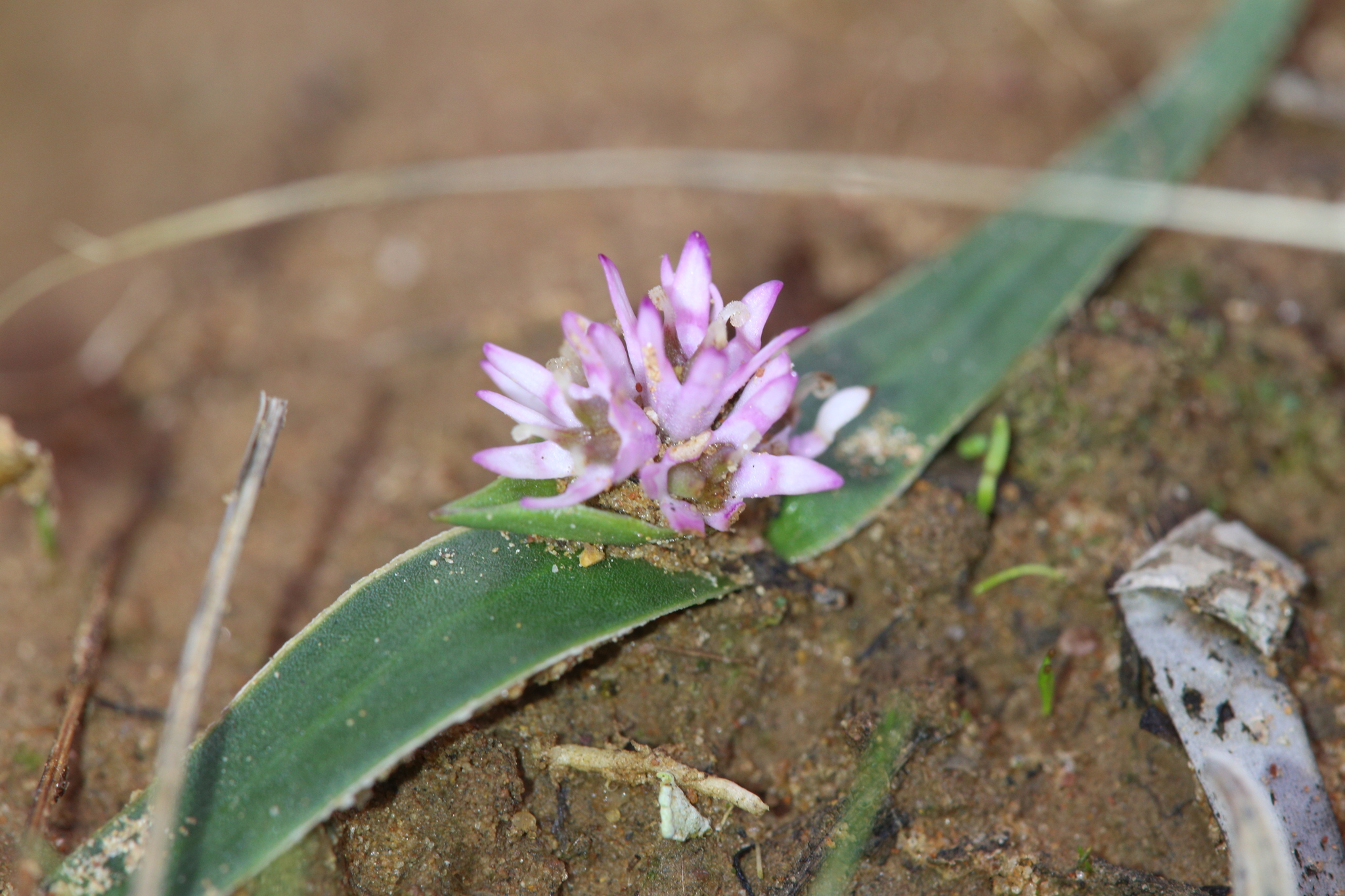

Scientific classification
- Kingdom: Plantae
- Clade: Embryophytes
- Clade: Tracheophytes
- Clade: Spermatophytes
- Clade: Angiosperms
- Clade: Monocots
- Order: Liliales
- Family: Colchicaceae
- Genus: Wurmbea
- Species: W. drummondii

Binomial name
- Wurmbea drummondii Benth.

= Wurmbea drummondii =

Species of flowering plant

Wurmbea drummondii, also known as the York Gum Nancy, is a species of plant in the family Colchicaceae that is endemic to Australia.

== Description ==
The species is a cormous perennial herb that grows to a height of 1.5–5 cm. Its white to pink flowers appear in June.

== Distribution and habitat ==
The species is found in the Avon Wheatbelt, Geraldton Sandplains and Jarrah Forest IBRA bioregions of western Western Australia. It grows in loam, clay and sandy clay soils on winter-wet sites.
