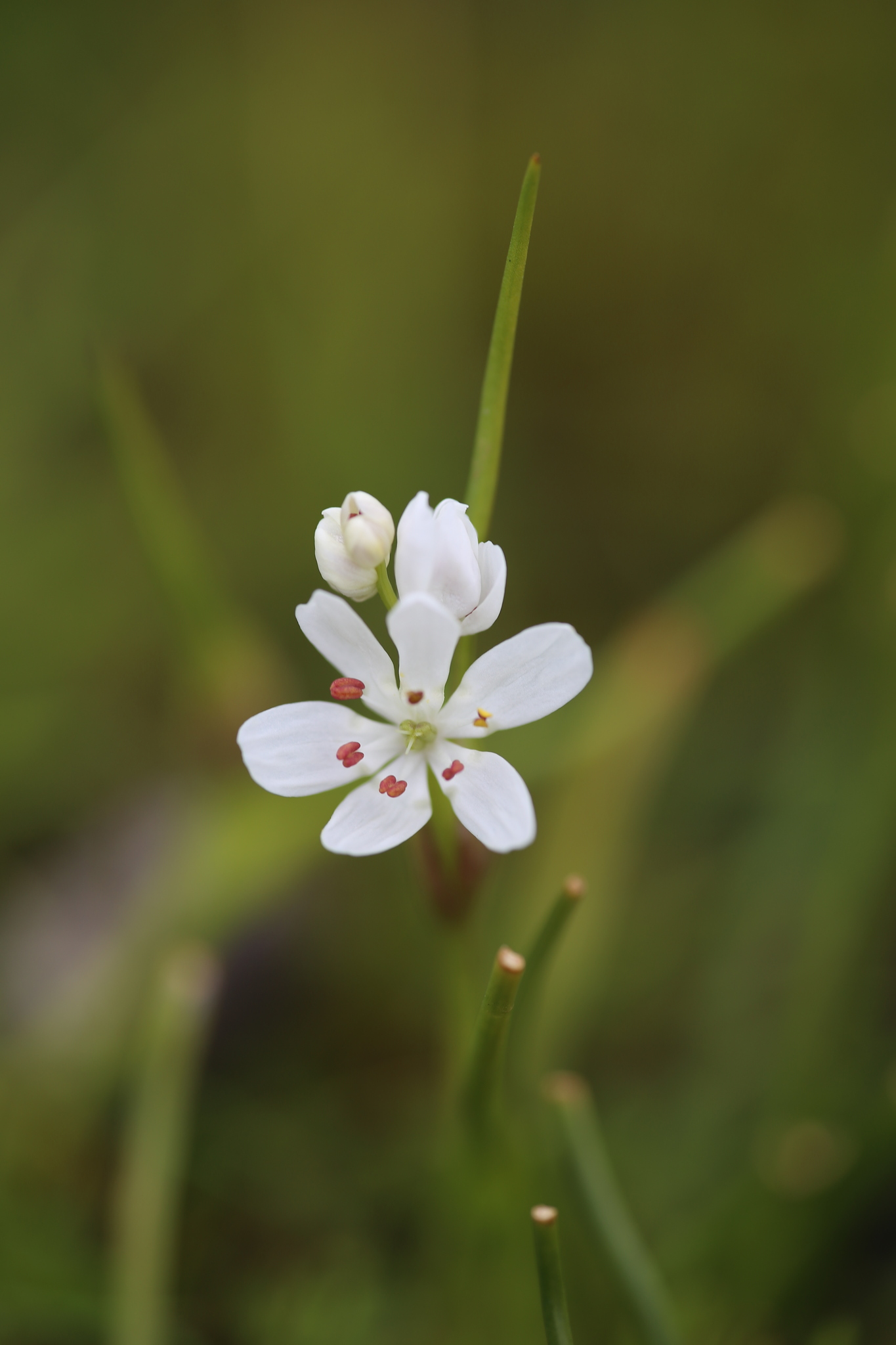

Scientific classification
- Kingdom: Plantae
- Clade: Embryophytes
- Clade: Tracheophytes
- Clade: Spermatophytes
- Clade: Angiosperms
- Clade: Monocots
- Order: Liliales
- Family: Colchicaceae
- Genus: Wurmbea
- Species: W. murchisoniana

Binomial name
- Wurmbea murchisoniana T.D.Macfarl.

= Wurmbea murchisoniana =

Species of flowering plant

Wurmbea murchisoniana is a species of plant in the family Colchicaceae that is endemic to Australia.

== Description ==
The species is a cormous perennial herb that grows to a height of 10–26 cm. Its white flowers appear from July to September.

== Distribution and habitat ==
The species is found in the Avon Wheatbelt, Coolgardie, Geraldton Sandplains, Murchison and Yalgoo IBRA bioregions of Western Australia. It grows in clay, sandy clay and loam soils, where there are gilgais or rock pools.
