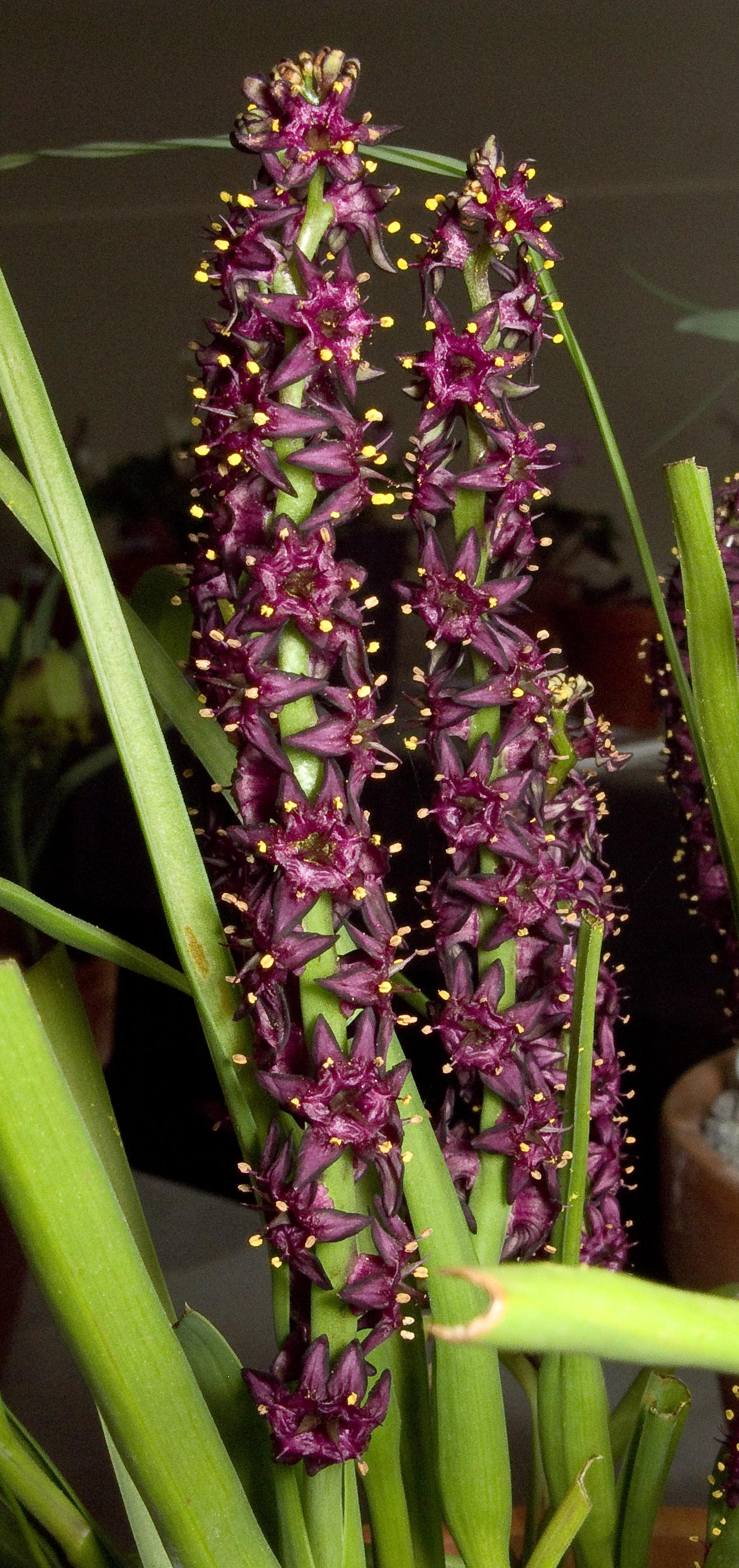
- In cultivation

Scientific classification
- Kingdom: Plantae
- Clade: Tracheophytes
- Clade: Angiosperms
- Clade: Monocots
- Order: Liliales
- Family: Colchicaceae
- Genus: Wurmbea
- Species: W. recurva

Binomial name
- Wurmbea recurva B.Nord.

Synonyms
- Wurmbea spicata f. revoluta T.Durand & Schinz

= Wurmbea recurva =

Species of flowering plant

Wurmbea recurva is a tuberous plant in the family Colchicaceae, native to the south-west Cape Province, South Africa.

It was first described by the Swedish botanist Rune Bertil Nordenstam in 1986.
