= Wurmbea saccata =

Scientific classification
- Kingdom: Plantae
- Clade: Embryophytes
- Clade: Tracheophytes
- Clade: Spermatophytes
- Clade: Angiosperms
- Clade: Monocots
- Order: Liliales
- Family: Colchicaceae
- Genus: Wurmbea
- Species: W. saccata

Binomial name
- Wurmbea saccata T.D.Macfarl. & S.J.van Leeuwen

Species of flowering plant

Wurmbea saccata is a species of plant in the Colchicaceae family that is endemic to Australia.

== Description ==
The species is a cormous perennial herb that grows to a height of 10–35 cm. Its pink or white flowers appear in June.

== Distribution and habitat ==
The species is found in the Gascoyne IBRA bioregion of north-western Western Australia. It grows in gritty red soils, or damp silty soils with pebbles, in creek beds and on the margins of rock pools.
