= Wurmbea australis =

Scientific classification
- Kingdom: Plantae
- Clade: Embryophytes
- Clade: Tracheophytes
- Clade: Spermatophytes
- Clade: Angiosperms
- Clade: Monocots
- Order: Liliales
- Family: Colchicaceae
- Genus: Wurmbea
- Species: W. australis

Binomial name
- Wurmbea australis (R.J.Bates) R.J.Bates, 2007

Synonyms
- Wurmbea centralis subsp. australis R.J.Bates, 1995

Species of flowering plant

Wurmbea australis is a species of plant in the Colchicaceae family that is endemic to South Australia.
