= Wurmbea pygmaea =

Scientific classification
- Kingdom: Plantae
- Clade: Embryophytes
- Clade: Tracheophytes
- Clade: Spermatophytes
- Clade: Angiosperms
- Clade: Monocots
- Order: Liliales
- Family: Colchicaceae
- Genus: Wurmbea
- Species: W. pygmaea

Binomial name
- Wurmbea pygmaea (Endl.)Benth.

Synonyms
- Anguillaria pygmaea Endl.

Species of flowering plant

Wurmbea pygmaea is a species of plant in the Colchicaceae family that is endemic to Australia.

== Description ==
The species is a cormous perennial herb that grows to a height of 1–5 cm. Its white or pink flowers appear from May to July.

== Distribution and habitat ==
The species is found in the Avon Wheatbelt, Geraldton Sandplains, Jarrah Forest and Swan Coastal Plain IBRA bioregions of south-western Western Australia. It grows in red or brown sand, clay and gravelly soils, which are often seasonally wet, as well as on granite outcrops.
