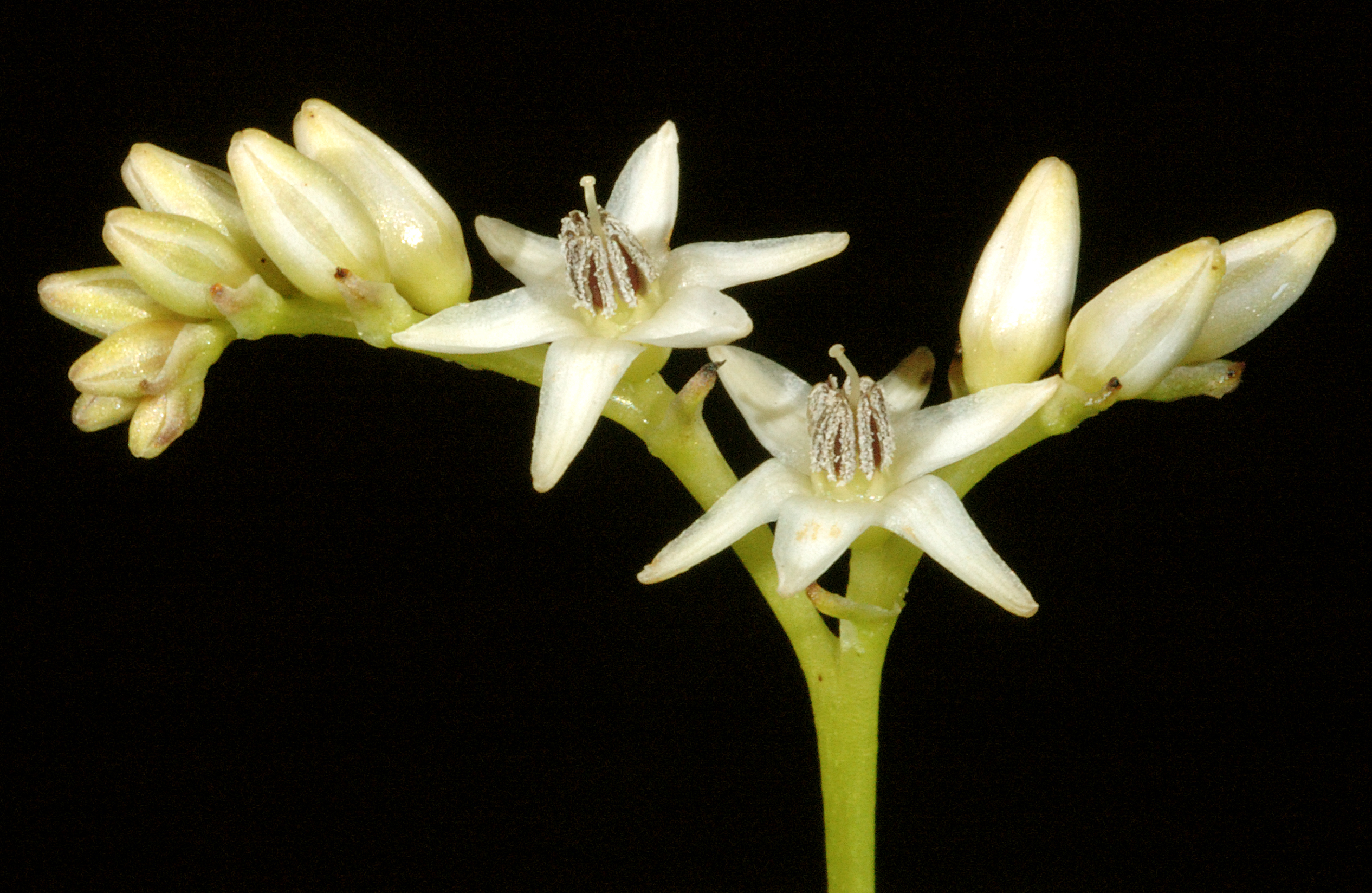
- Phlebocarya ciliata

Scientific classification
- Kingdom: Plantae
- Clade: Tracheophytes
- Clade: Angiosperms
- Clade: Monocots
- Clade: Commelinids
- Order: Commelinales
- Family: Haemodoraceae
- Subfamily: Conostylidoideae
- Genus: Phlebocarya; R.Br.

Type species
- Phlebocarya ciliata R.Br.

= Phlebocarya =

Genus of flowering plants

Phlebocarya is a genus of herbs in the family Haemodoraceae, first described as a genus in 1810. The entire genus is endemic to the southwestern part of Western Australia.

Species

- Phlebocarya ciliata R.Br.
- Phlebocarya filifolia (F.Muell.) Benth.
- Phlebocarya pilosissima (F.Muell.) Benth.
