= Petrophile vana =

Conservation status
- Priority One — Poorly Known Taxa (DEC)

Scientific classification
- Kingdom: Plantae
- Clade: Tracheophytes
- Clade: Angiosperms
- Clade: Eudicots
- Order: Proteales
- Family: Proteaceae
- Genus: Petrophile
- Species: P. vana

Binomial name
- Petrophile vana Cranfield & T.D.Macfarl.

Species of shrub endemic to Western Australia

Petrophile vana is a species of flowering plant in the family Proteaceae and is endemic to inland Western Australia. It is a shrub with needle-shaped, sharply-pointed leaves, and spherical to oval heads of small numbers of hairy, white flowers.

== Description ==
Petrophile vana is a shrub that typically grows to a height of 0.4–1.7 m (1 ft 4 in – 5 ft 7 in) and has hairy young branchlets that become glabrous as they age. The leaves are needle-shaped, 30–60 mm (1.2–2.4 in) long, 1–1.5 mm (0.039–0.059 in) wide and sharply-pointed. The flowers are arranged in leaf axils in sessile, spherical to oval heads of up to four flowers, the heads 10 mm (0.39 in) long and 3–4 mm (0.12–0.16 in) wide, with about four overlapping, egg-shaped involucral bracts at the base. The flowers are 7–10 mm (0.28–0.39 in) long, white and hairy. Flowering has been observed in September and the fruit is a small nut.

== Taxonomy ==
Petrophile vana was first formally described in 2007 by Raymond Jeffrey Cranfield and Terry Desmond Macfarlane in the journal Nuytsia from material collected by Cranfield on Melangata Station in 1987. The specific epithet (vana) means "empty, idle or worthless", but said by the authors to mean "trifling, referring to the non-showy appearance of the plant".

== Distribution and habitat ==
This petrophile is only known from a few locations in the Murchison and Yalgoo biogeographic regions where it grows in shallow, gritty clay soils over laterite, sometimes in heath with Thryptomene species.

== Conservation status ==
Petrophile vana is classified as "Priority One" by the Government of Western Australia Department of Parks and Wildlife, meaning that it is known from only one or a few locations which are potentially at risk.
