= Wurmbea citrina =

Scientific classification
- Kingdom: Plantae
- Clade: Embryophytes
- Clade: Tracheophytes
- Clade: Spermatophytes
- Clade: Angiosperms
- Clade: Monocots
- Order: Liliales
- Family: Colchicaceae
- Genus: Wurmbea
- Species: W. citrina

Binomial name
- Wurmbea citrina (R.J.Bates) R.J.Bates, 2007

Synonyms
- Wurmbea dioica subsp. citrina R.J.Bates, 1995

Species of flowering plant

Wurmbea citrina is a species of plant in the Colchicaceae family that is endemic to Australia.

== Description ==
The species is a cormous perennial herb that grows to a height of 2–30 cm. The flowers are greenish-yellow with brown nectaries; they appear from early spring to autumn, after rain.

== Distribution and habitat ==
The species is found in western New South Wales and inland South Australia. It grows on shallow sandy soils over clay, and on claypans.
