= Wurmbea deserticola =

Scientific classification
- Kingdom: Plantae
- Clade: Embryophytes
- Clade: Tracheophytes
- Clade: Spermatophytes
- Clade: Angiosperms
- Clade: Monocots
- Order: Liliales
- Family: Colchicaceae
- Genus: Wurmbea
- Species: W. deserticola

Binomial name
- Wurmbea deserticola T.D.Macfarl.

Species of flowering plant

Wurmbea deserticola is a species of plant in the Colchicaceae family that is endemic to Australia.

== Description ==
The species is a cormous perennial herb that grows to a height of 7–25 cm. Its pink-white flowers appear from May to December.

== Distribution and habitat ==
The species is found in the Central Ranges, Gascoyne, Gibson Desert, Great Victoria Desert, Little Sandy Desert and Murchison IBRA bioregions of Western Australia, its range extending just over the border to the south-western Northern Territory. It grows on sand dunes as well as red sand, lateritic loam and rocky soils.
