= Wurmbea centralis =

Scientific classification
- Kingdom: Plantae
- Clade: Embryophytes
- Clade: Tracheophytes
- Clade: Spermatophytes
- Clade: Angiosperms
- Clade: Monocots
- Order: Liliales
- Family: Colchicaceae
- Genus: Wurmbea
- Species: W. centralis

Binomial name
- Wurmbea centralis T.D.Macfarl.

Species of flowering plant

Wurmbea centralis is a species of plant in the Colchicaceae family that is endemic to Australia.

== Description ==
The species is a cormous perennial herb that grows to a height of 4.5–20 cm. Its pink or purplish-pink flowers appear from May to August.

== Distribution and habitat ==
The species is found in South Australia and the southern Northern Territory. It grows mainly in hilly areas among rocks.
