= Wurmbea calcicola =

Conservation status
- Endangered (EPBC Act)

Scientific classification
- Kingdom: Plantae
- Clade: Embryophytes
- Clade: Tracheophytes
- Clade: Spermatophytes
- Clade: Angiosperms
- Clade: Monocots
- Order: Liliales
- Family: Colchicaceae
- Genus: Wurmbea
- Species: W. calcicola

Binomial name
- Wurmbea calcicola T.D.Macfarl.

Species of flowering plant

Wurmbea calcicola, also known as Naturaliste Nancy, is a species of plant in the Colchicaceae family that is endemic to Australia. It is classified as Endangered under Australia's EPBC Act.

== Description ==
The species is a cormous perennial herb that grows to a height of 25 cm. Its white to pink flowers appear in June.

== Distribution and habitat ==
The species has a limited range in the vicinity of Cape Naturaliste, in the Jarrah Forest IBRA bioregion of south-western Western Australia. It grows in loam soils on limestone cliffs.
