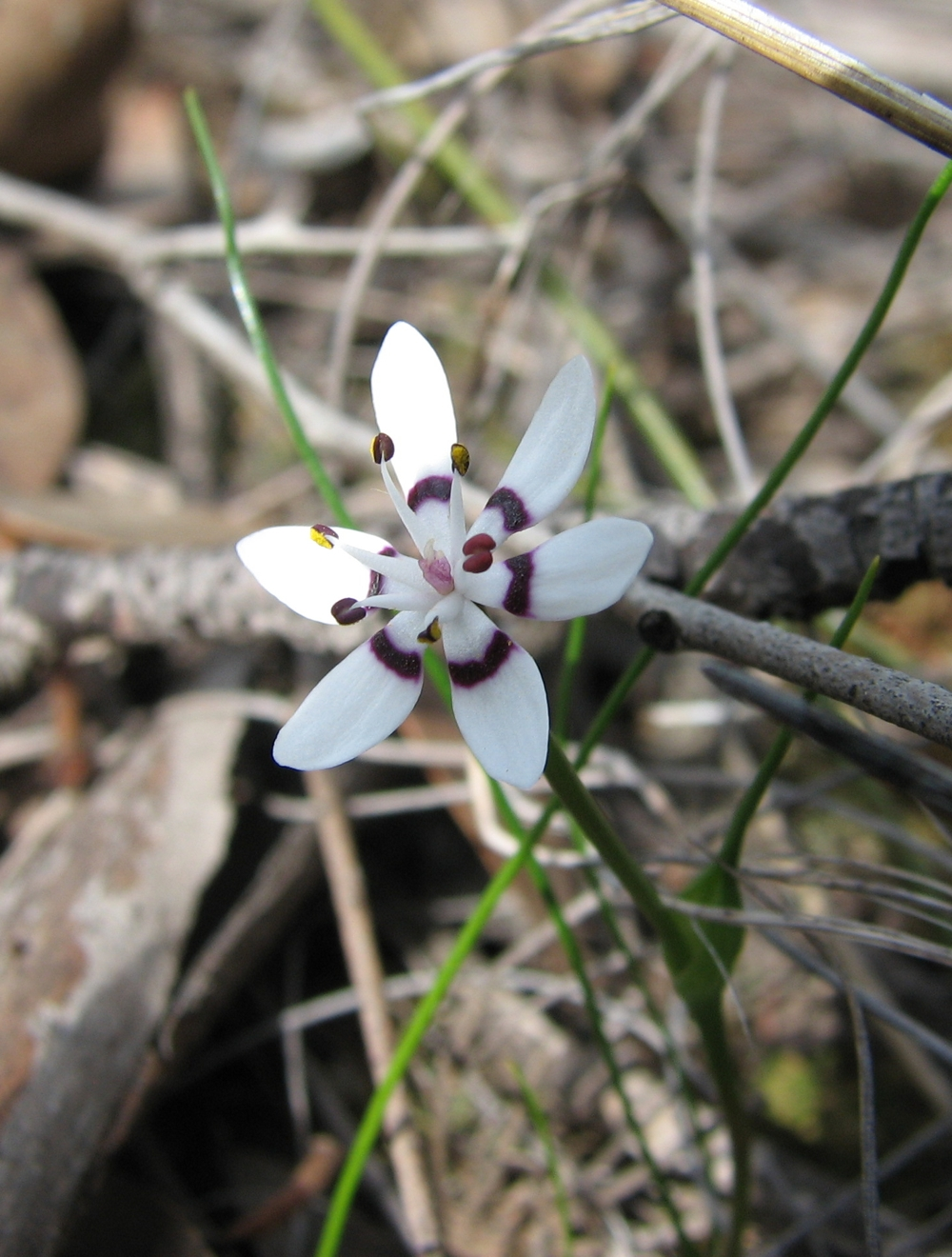
- Wurmbea dioica in Paddys Ranges State Park, Australia

Scientific classification
- Kingdom: Plantae
- Clade: Tracheophytes
- Clade: Angiosperms
- Clade: Monocots
- Order: Liliales
- Family: Colchicaceae
- Genus: Wurmbea; Thunb.

Species
- See text

Synonyms
- Anguillaria R.Br.; Anguillaraea T.Post & Kuntze; Dipidax Lawson ex Salisb; Neodregea C.H.Wright; Onixotis Raf.; Skizima Raf.

= Wurmbea =

Genus of flowering plants

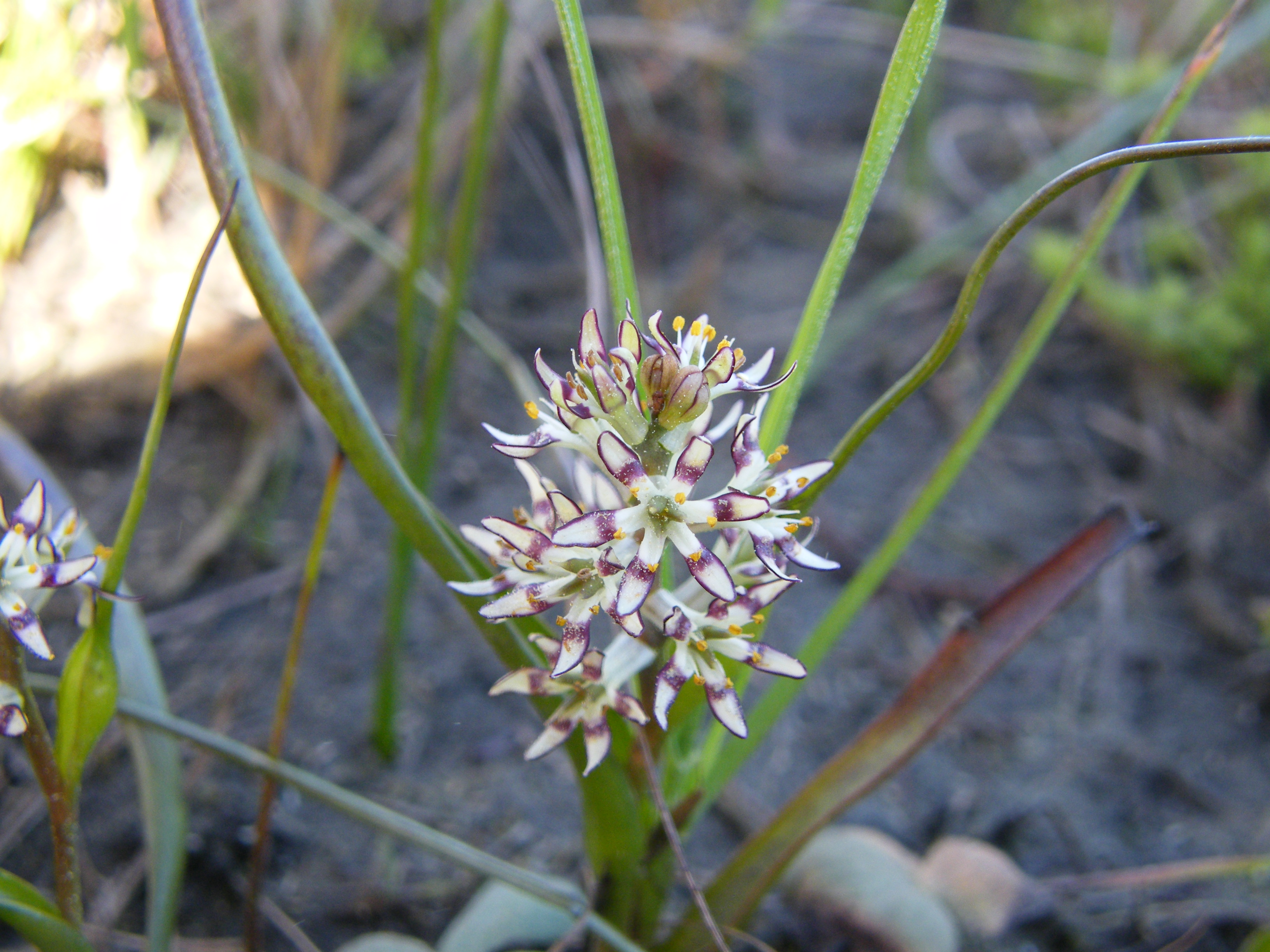
Wurmbea inusta, a species from South Africa

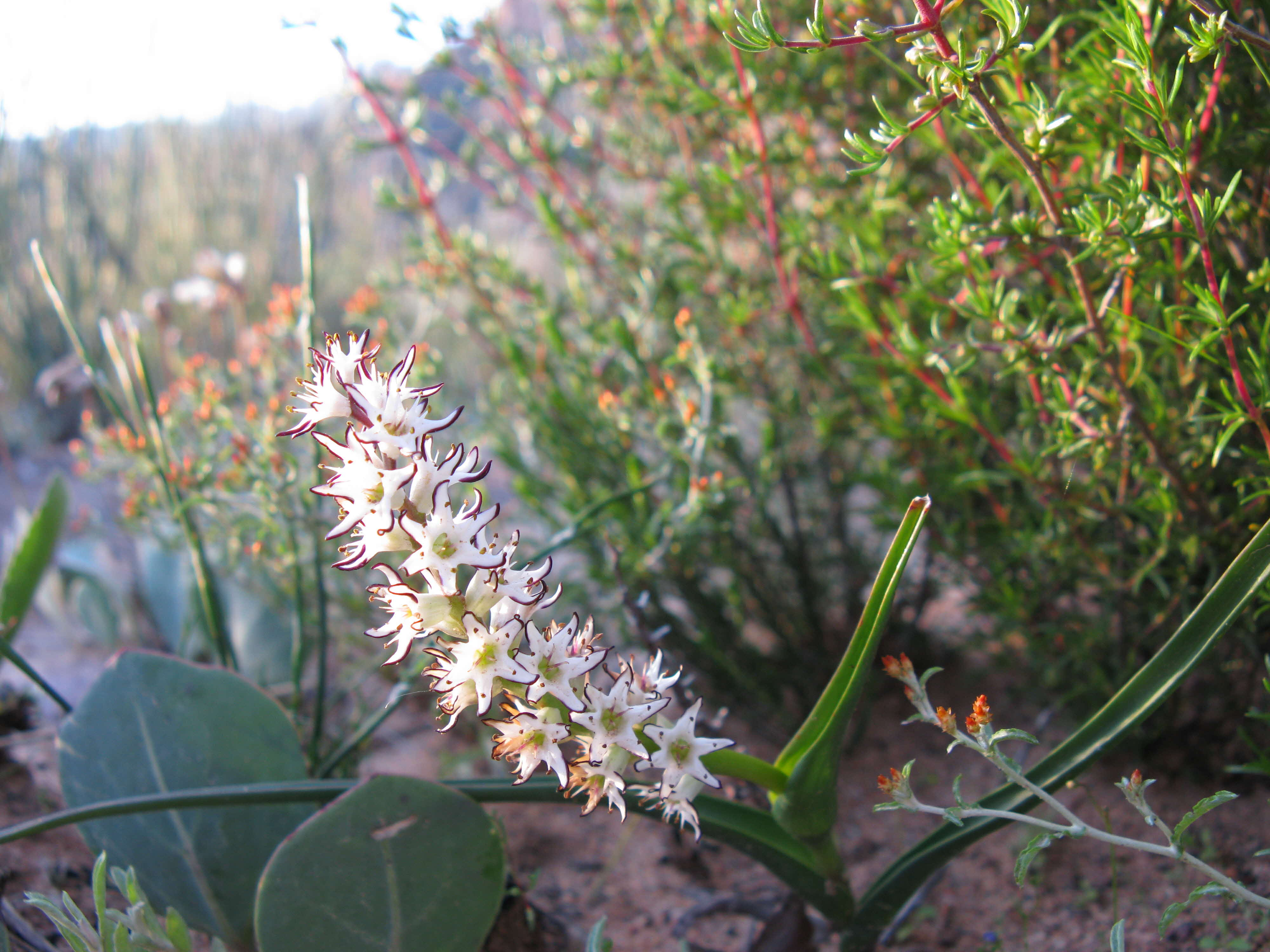
This specimen might be Wurmbea spicata, Cedarberg South Africa

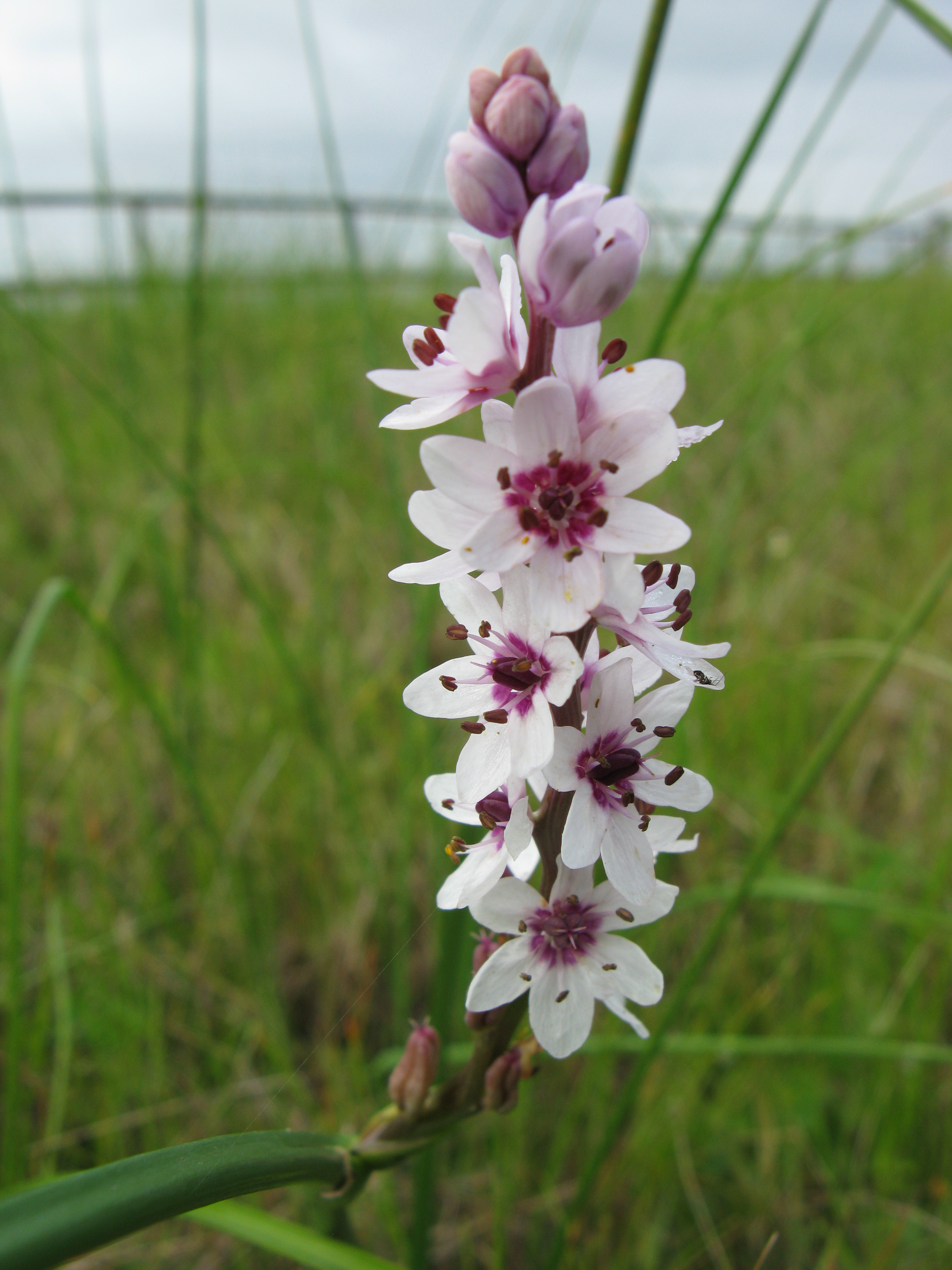
Wurmbea stricta. This species used to be classified first in the genus Dipidax, then in Onixotis. This specimen photographed near Hermon in the Western Cape, but the species occurs widely in seasonally wet regions in fynbos.

Wurmbea is a genus of perennial herbs in the family Colchicaceae, native to Africa and Australasia. There are about 50 species, with about half endemic to each continent.

African species accepted as of February 2025 are:

- Wurmbea angustifolia B.Nord. – E. Zimbabwe to S. Africa
- Wurmbea burrowsii Oosth. & K.Balkwill – Mpumalanga
- Wurmbea burttii B.Nord. – Lesotho to KwaZulu-Natal
- Wurmbea capensis Thunb. – S.W. Cape Province
- Wurmbea compacta B.Nord. – S.W. Cape Province
- Wurmbea dolichantha B.Nord. – W. Cape Province
- Wurmbea elatior B.Nord. – S. Africa
- Wurmbea elongata B.Nord. – S.W. Cape Province
- Wurmbea glassii (C.H.Wright) J.C.Manning & Vinn. – S. Cape Province
- Wurmbea hiemalis B.Nord. – S.W. Cape Province
- Wurmbea inusta (Baker) B.Nord. – S.W. Cape Province
- Wurmbea kraussii Baker – S. Africa
- Wurmbea marginata (Desr.) B.Nord. – S.W. Cape Province
- Wurmbea minima B.Nord. – S.W. Cape Province
- Wurmbea monopetala (L.f.) B.Nord. – S.W. Cape Province
- Wurmbea punctata (L.) J.C.Manning & Vinn. – S.W. Cape Province
- Wurmbea pusilla E.Phillips – Lesotho to KwaZulu-Natal
- Wurmbea recurva B.Nord. – S.W. Cape Province
- Wurmbea robusta B.Nord. – S.W. Cape Province
- Wurmbea spicata (Burm.f.) T.Durand & Schinz – Cape Province
- Wurmbea stricta (Burm.f.) J.C.Manning & Vinn. – Cape Province
- Wurmbea tenuis (Hook.f.) Baker – Tropical & S. Africa
- Wurmbea variabilis B.Nord. – Cape Province
- Wurmbea viridiflora Oosth. & K.Balkwill – Mpumalanga

Australasian species accepted as of February 2025 are:

- Wurmbea australis (R.J.Bates) R.J.Bates – South Australia
- Wurmbea biglandulosa (R.Br.) T.D.Macfarl. – S.E. Queensland to SE. Australia
- Wurmbea calcicola T.D.Macfarl. – S.W. Australia
- Wurmbea centralis T.D.Macfarl. – Central & S. Australia
- Wurmbea cernua T.D.Macfarl. – S. Western Australia
- Wurmbea citrina (R.J.Bates) R.J.Bates – S.E. Australia
- Wurmbea decumbens R.J.Bates – South Australia (Eyre Peninsula)
- Wurmbea densiflora (Benth.) T.D.Macfarl. – Western Australia
- Wurmbea deserticola T.D.Macfarl. – W. & Central Australia
- Wurmbea dilatata T.D.Macfarl. – W. Western Australia
- Wurmbea dioica (R.Br.) F.Muell. – S.W. & S.E. Australia
- Wurmbea drummondii Benth. – S.W. Australia
- Wurmbea flavanthera T.D.Macfarl., A.P.Br. & C.J.French – C.W. Western Australia
- Wurmbea fluviatilis T.D.Macfarl. & A.L.Case – N.W. Western Australia
- Wurmbea graniticola T.D.Macfarl. – S.W. Australia
- Wurmbea inflata T.D.Macfarl. & A.L.Case – W. Central Western Australia
- Wurmbea inframediana T.D.Macfarl. – W. Western Australia
- Wurmbea latifolia T.D.Macfarl. – S.E. Australia
- Wurmbea monantha (Endl.) T.D.Macfarl. – W. & S.W. Western Australia
- Wurmbea murchisoniana T.D.Macfarl. – W. Western Australia
- Wurmbea novae-zelandiae (Hook.f. ex Kirk) Lekhak, Survesw. & S.R.Yadav – New Zealand (S. Canterbury to N. Otago)
- Wurmbea nilpinna R.J.Bates – South Australia
- Wurmbea odorata T.D.Macfarl. – W. Western Australia
- Wurmbea pygmaea (Endl.) Benth. – WS.W. Western Australia
- Wurmbea saccata T.D.Macfarl. & S.J.van Leeuwen – N.W. Western Australia
- Wurmbea sinora T.D.Macfarl. – S.W. & S. Western Australia
- Wurmbea stellata R.J.Bates – South Australia
- Wurmbea tenella (Endl.) Benth. – Western Australia
- Wurmbea tubulosa Benth. – WS.W. Western Australia
- Wurmbea uniflora (R.Br.) T.D.Macfarl. – S.E. Australia
