= Wurmbea nilpinna =

Scientific classification
- Kingdom: Plantae
- Clade: Embryophytes
- Clade: Tracheophytes
- Clade: Spermatophytes
- Clade: Angiosperms
- Clade: Monocots
- Order: Liliales
- Family: Colchicaceae
- Genus: Wurmbea
- Species: W. nilpinna

Binomial name
- Wurmbea nilpinna R.J.Bates, 2007

Species of flowering plant

Wurmbea nilpinna is a species of plant in the Colchicaceae family that is endemic to South Australia.

== Distribution ==
The species is known only from Nilpinna Station in the Davenport Range of the Lake Eyre region of South Australia.
