= Thysanotus unicupensis =

Conservation status
- Priority Three — Poorly Known Taxa (DEC)

Scientific classification
- Kingdom: Plantae
- Clade: Embryophytes
- Clade: Tracheophytes
- Clade: Spermatophytes
- Clade: Angiosperms
- Clade: Monocots
- Order: Asparagales
- Family: Asparagaceae
- Subfamily: Lomandroideae
- Genus: Thysanotus
- Species: T. unicupensis

Binomial name
- Thysanotus unicupensis Sirisena, T.D.Macfarl. & Conran

Species of plant

Thysanotus unicupensis is a species of flowering plant in the Asparagaceae family, and is endemic to the south-west of Western Australia. It is a perennial herb with a small rhizomes, fibrous roots, up to five glabrous, terete leaves and a clusters of flowers in umbels of two to four purple flowers with lance-shaped outer tepals, elliptic fringed inner tepals and six stamens with more or less equal anthers.

== Description ==
Thysanotus unicupensis is a perennial herb with a small rhizome and fibrous, fleshy roots and up to five terete, glabrous leaves, about 30 mm (1.2 in) long and 2 mm (0.079 in) wide. The flowers are borne in clusters of seven to seventeen in umbels of two to four flowers, each on a pedicel 7–9 mm (0.28–0.35 in) long with usually three egg-shaped to lance-shaped bracts 5–7 mm (0.20–0.28 in) long and 2–3.5 mm (0.079–0.138 in) wide at the base. The three outer tepals are lance-shaped, 1.2–1.5 mm (0.047–0.059 in) wide, and the inner tepals are broadly elliptic, 3.2–3.5 mm (0.13–0.14 in) wide, with a fringe about 1.3 mm (0.051 in) long. There are six stamens, the anthers more or less equal in length, the style straight to slightly curved. Flowering occurs from late October to early December, and the seeds are narrowly elliptic about 1.5 mm (0.059 in) long and 1 mm (0.039 in) in wide with a stalked, straw-coloured aril.

== Taxonomy ==
Thysanotus unicupensis was first formally described in 2009 by Udani M. Sirisena, Terry Desmond Macfarlane and John Godfrey Conran in the journal Nuytsia from speciens collected in the Unicup Nature Reserve. The specific epithet (unicupensis) is named after the Unicup Nature Reserve, where the species was first recognised.

== Distribution and habitat ==
This species of Thysanotus grows in lateritic and sandy sils in jarrah forest in the Mulallyup and Boyup Brook areas in the Jarrah Forest bioregion of south-western Western Australia.

== Conservation status ==
Thysanotus teretifolius is listed as "Priority Three" by the Government of Western Australia Department of Parks and Wildlife, meaning that it is poorly known and known from only a few locations but is not under imminent threat.
