= Wurmbea odorata =

Scientific classification
- Kingdom: Plantae
- Clade: Embryophytes
- Clade: Tracheophytes
- Clade: Spermatophytes
- Clade: Angiosperms
- Clade: Monocots
- Order: Liliales
- Family: Colchicaceae
- Genus: Wurmbea
- Species: W. odorata

Binomial name
- Wurmbea odorata T.D.Macfarl.

Species of flowering plant

Wurmbea odorata is a species of plant in the Colchicaceae family that is endemic to Australia.

== Description ==
The species is a cormous perennial herb that grows to a height of 10–24 cm. Its white flowers appear from June to September.

== Distribution and habitat ==
The species is found in the Carnarvon and Yalgoo IBRA bioregions of western Western Australia. It grows in red sand soils, sometimes over limestone substrates.
