= Wurmbea latifolia =

Scientific classification
- Kingdom: Plantae
- Clade: Embryophytes
- Clade: Tracheophytes
- Clade: Spermatophytes
- Clade: Angiosperms
- Clade: Monocots
- Order: Liliales
- Family: Colchicaceae
- Genus: Wurmbea
- Species: W. latifolia

Binomial name
- Wurmbea latifolia T.D.Macfarl.

Synonyms
- Anguillaria dioica var. multiflora Hook.f.

Species of flowering plant

Wurmbea latifolia, also known as Broadleaf Early Nancy, is a species of plant in the Colchicaceae family that is endemic to Australia.

== Subspecies ==
- Wurmbea latifolia subsp. latifolia
- Wurmbea latifolia subsp. vanessae

== Description ==
The species is a cormous perennial herb that grows to a height of 5–15 cm. Its white to faintly purple flowers appear from late winter to spring.

== Distribution and habitat ==
The species is found in New South Wales, Victoria and Tasmania. It grows mainly in heavy soils.
