= Wurmbea graniticola =

Scientific classification
- Kingdom: Plantae
- Clade: Embryophytes
- Clade: Tracheophytes
- Clade: Spermatophytes
- Clade: Angiosperms
- Clade: Monocots
- Order: Liliales
- Family: Colchicaceae
- Genus: Wurmbea
- Species: W. graniticola

Binomial name
- Wurmbea graniticola T.D.Macfarl.

Species of flowering plant

Wurmbea graniticola is a species of plant in the Colchicaceae family that is endemic to Australia.

== Description ==
The species is a cormous perennial herb that grows to a height of 1.5–11 cm. Its white to pink flowers appear from July to October.

== Distribution and habitat ==
The species is found in the Avon Wheatbelt, Coolgardie, Esperance Plains, Jarrah Forest and Mallee IBRA bioregions of south-western Western Australia. It grows in clay and sandy soils on granite outcrops.
