= Wurmbea densiflora =

Scientific classification
- Kingdom: Plantae
- Clade: Embryophytes
- Clade: Tracheophytes
- Clade: Spermatophytes
- Clade: Angiosperms
- Clade: Monocots
- Order: Liliales
- Family: Colchicaceae
- Genus: Wurmbea
- Species: W. densiflora

Binomial name
- Wurmbea densiflora (Benth.) T.D.Macfarl.

Synonyms
- Anguillaria densiflora Benth.

Species of flowering plant

Wurmbea densiflora is a species of plant in the Colchicaceae family that is endemic to Australia.

== Description ==
The species is a cormous perennial herb that grows to a height of 7–20 cm. Its pink flowers appear from May to September.

== Distribution and habitat ==
The species is found in the Avon Wheatbelt, Coolgardie, Geraldton Sandplains, Great Victoria Desert, Murchison and Yalgoo IBRA bioregions of western Western Australia. It grows in red loam, clay and sandy clay soils.
