= Wurmbea inframediana =

Scientific classification
- Kingdom: Plantae
- Clade: Embryophytes
- Clade: Tracheophytes
- Clade: Spermatophytes
- Clade: Angiosperms
- Clade: Monocots
- Order: Liliales
- Family: Colchicaceae
- Genus: Wurmbea
- Species: W. inframediana

Binomial name
- Wurmbea inframediana T.D.Macfarl.

Species of flowering plant

Wurmbea inframediana is a species of plant in the Colchicaceae family that is endemic to Australia.

== Description ==
The species is a cormous perennial herb that grows to a height of 2.5–12 cm. Its pink flowers appear from June to August.

== Distribution and habitat ==
The species is found in the Carnarvon, Gascoyne, Geraldton Sandplains, Murchison and Yalgoo IBRA bioregions of western Western Australia. It grows in red sand, loam and limestone soils.
