= Wurmbea sinora =

Scientific classification
- Kingdom: Plantae
- Clade: Embryophytes
- Clade: Tracheophytes
- Clade: Spermatophytes
- Clade: Angiosperms
- Clade: Monocots
- Order: Liliales
- Family: Colchicaceae
- Genus: Wurmbea
- Species: W. sinora

Binomial name
- Wurmbea sinora T.D.Macfarl.

Species of flowering plant

Wurmbea sinora is a species of plant in the Colchicaceae family that is endemic to Australia.

== Description ==
The species is a cormous perennial herb that grows to a height of 1.5–8 cm. Its white flowers appear from July to September.

== Distribution and habitat ==
The species is found in the Avon Wheatbelt, Esperance Plains, Jarrah Forest, Mallee and Warren IBRA bioregions of south-western and southern Western Australia. It grows in loam and sandy clay soils over granite rocks in seasonally-wet areas and salt marshes.
