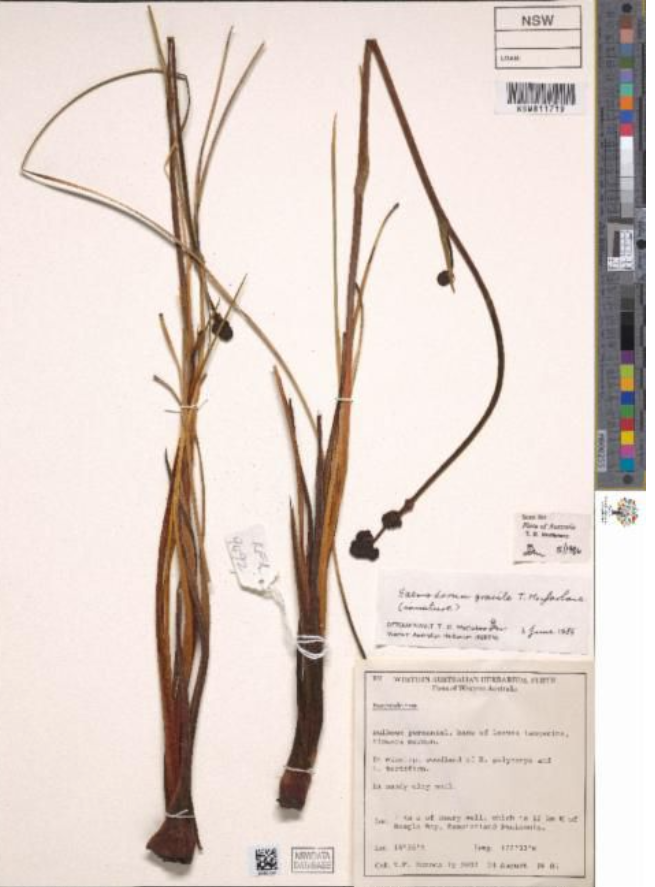
- NSW811719

Scientific classification
- Kingdom: Plantae
- Clade: Tracheophytes
- Clade: Angiosperms
- Clade: Monocots
- Clade: Commelinids
- Order: Commelinales
- Family: Haemodoraceae
- Genus: Haemodorum
- Species: H. gracile

Binomial name
- Haemodorum gracile T.D.Macfarl.
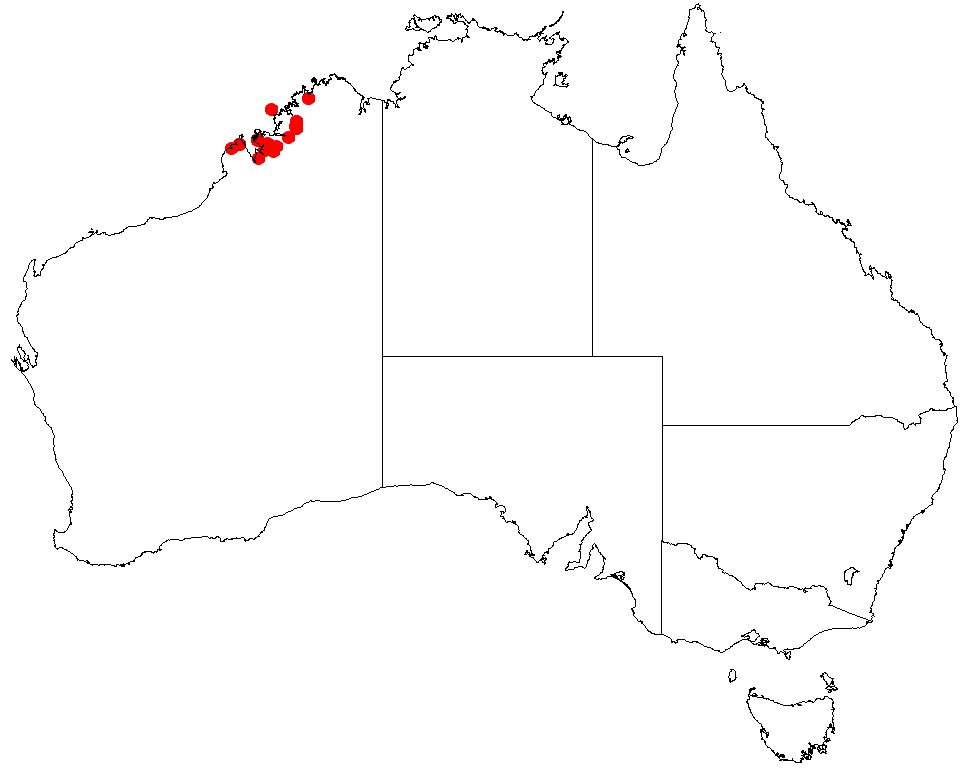

= Haemodorum gracile =

Species of flowering plant

Haemodorum gracile is a plant in the Haemodoraceae (blood root) family, native to Western Australia, and was first described by Terry Desmond Macfarlane in 1987.

It is a bulbous perennial herb, growing from 0.4 to 0.65 m high, on sands and sandy clays in the west Kimberley region of Western Australia. Its red/brown flowers are seen from August to November.
