= Wurmbea tubulosa =

Conservation status
- Endangered (EPBC Act)

Scientific classification
- Kingdom: Plantae
- Clade: Embryophytes
- Clade: Tracheophytes
- Clade: Spermatophytes
- Clade: Angiosperms
- Clade: Monocots
- Order: Liliales
- Family: Colchicaceae
- Genus: Wurmbea
- Species: W. tubulosa

Binomial name
- Wurmbea tubulosa Benth.

Species of flowering plant

Wurmbea tubulosa, also known as Long-flowered Nancy, is a species of plant in the Colchicaceae family that is endemic to Australia. It is classified as Endangered under Australia's EPBC Act.

== Description ==
The species is a cormous perennial herb that grows to a height of 10–30 cm. Its white to pink flowers appear from June to August.

== Distribution and habitat ==
The species occurs in the vicinity of Geraldton in the Avon Wheatbelt and Geraldton Sandplains IBRA bioregions of Western Australia. It grows in clay and loam soils on riverbanks and in seasonally wet areas.
