= Wurmbea decumbens =

Scientific classification
- Kingdom: Plantae
- Clade: Embryophytes
- Clade: Tracheophytes
- Clade: Spermatophytes
- Clade: Angiosperms
- Clade: Monocots
- Order: Liliales
- Family: Colchicaceae
- Genus: Wurmbea
- Species: W. decumbens

Binomial name
- Wurmbea decumbens R.J.Bates, 1995

Species of flowering plant

Wurmbea decumbens is a species of plant in the Colchicaceae family that is endemic to South Australia.

== Distribution ==
The species is found on South Australia's Eyre Peninsula.
