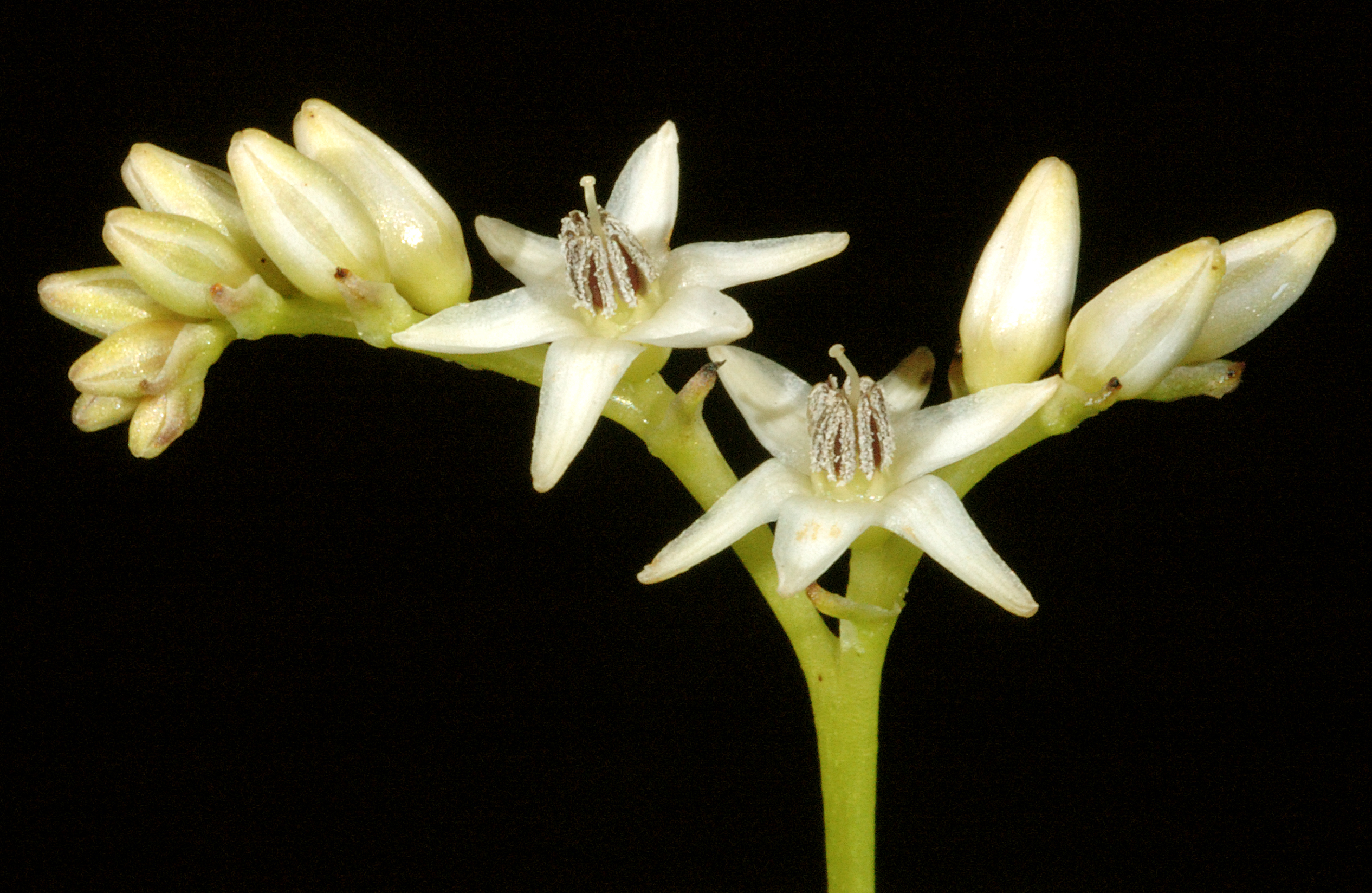

Scientific classification
- Kingdom: Plantae
- Clade: Tracheophytes
- Clade: Angiosperms
- Clade: Monocots
- Clade: Commelinids
- Order: Commelinales
- Family: Haemodoraceae
- Genus: Phlebocarya
- Species: P. ciliata

Binomial name
- Phlebocarya ciliata R.Br.

Synonyms
- Phlebocarya laevis Lindl.

= Phlebocarya ciliata =

Species of flowering plant

Phlebocarya ciliata is a plant in the Haemodoraceae family, native to Western Australia.

It was first described by Robert Brown in 1810.

== Description ==
Phlebocarya ciliata has flat leaves with leaf blades that are 25-65 cm by 1.6-3.7 mm and have fringed margins (though sometimes only towards the apex or the base). The flowerhead is about 1/3 to 2/3 as long as the leaves. The style is simple and there is one stigma.

It flowers from September to November and grows in heath and woodland in swampy to well-drained sandy soils.

== Etymology ==
The species epithet, ciliata, is a Latin adjective, ciliatus (from cilium, "eyelash") and thus describes the plant as having fine hairs extending from an edge, like an eyelash.
