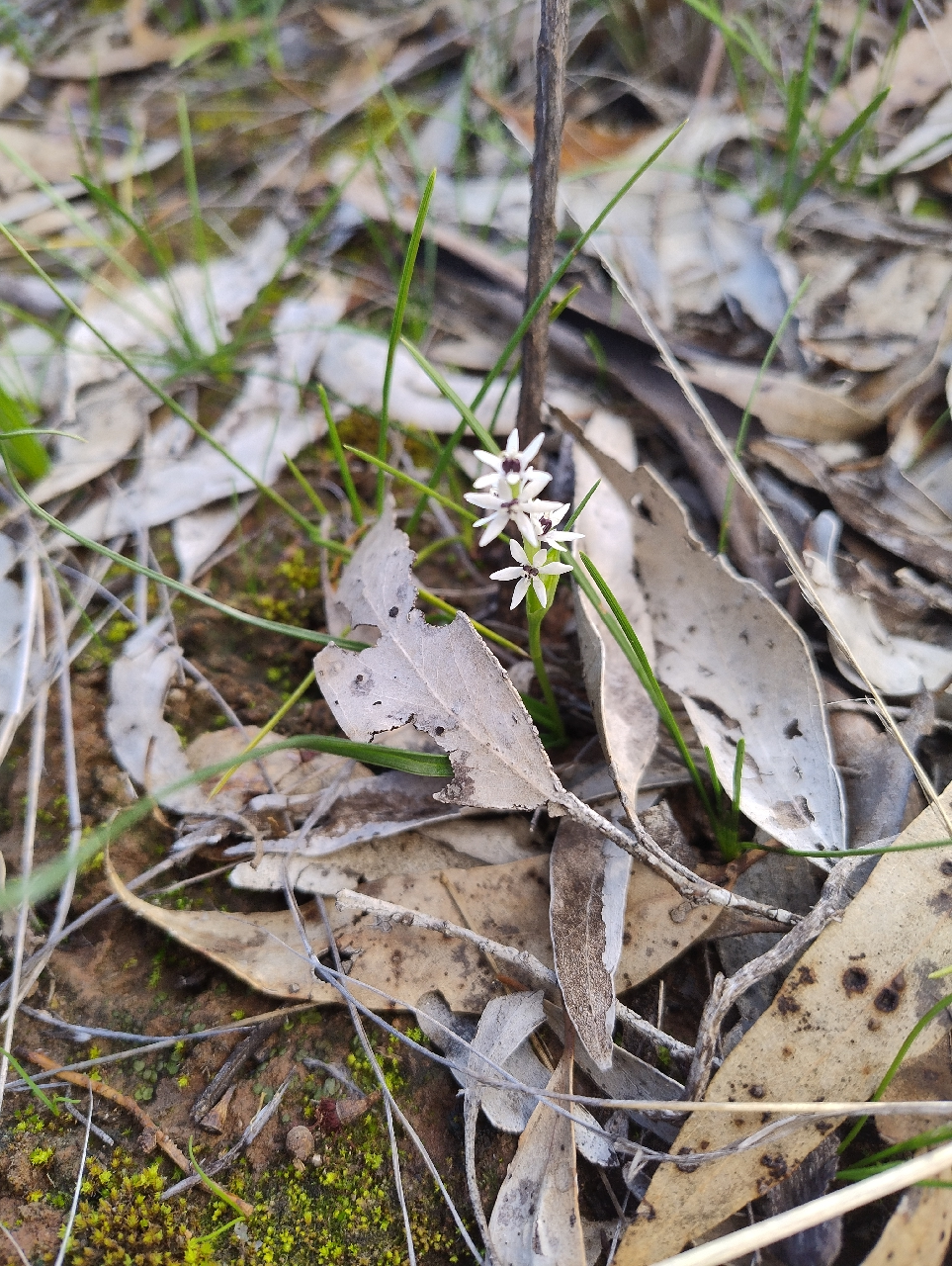

Scientific classification
- Kingdom: Plantae
- Clade: Embryophytes
- Clade: Tracheophytes
- Clade: Spermatophytes
- Clade: Angiosperms
- Clade: Monocots
- Order: Liliales
- Family: Colchicaceae
- Genus: Wurmbea
- Species: W. uniflora

Binomial name
- Wurmbea uniflora (R.Br.) T.D.Macfarl.

Synonyms
- Anguillaria uniflora R.Br.

= Wurmbea uniflora =

Species of flowering plant

Wurmbea uniflora, also known as one-flower Nancy, is a species of plant in the Colchicaceae family that is endemic to Australia.

== Description ==
The species is a cormous perennial herb that grows to a height of 4–17 cm. Its solitary white flower appears in spring.

== Distribution and habitat ==
The species is found in south-eastern Australia in New South Wales, South Australia, Victoria and Tasmania. It grows in marshy places.

Wurmbea uniflora

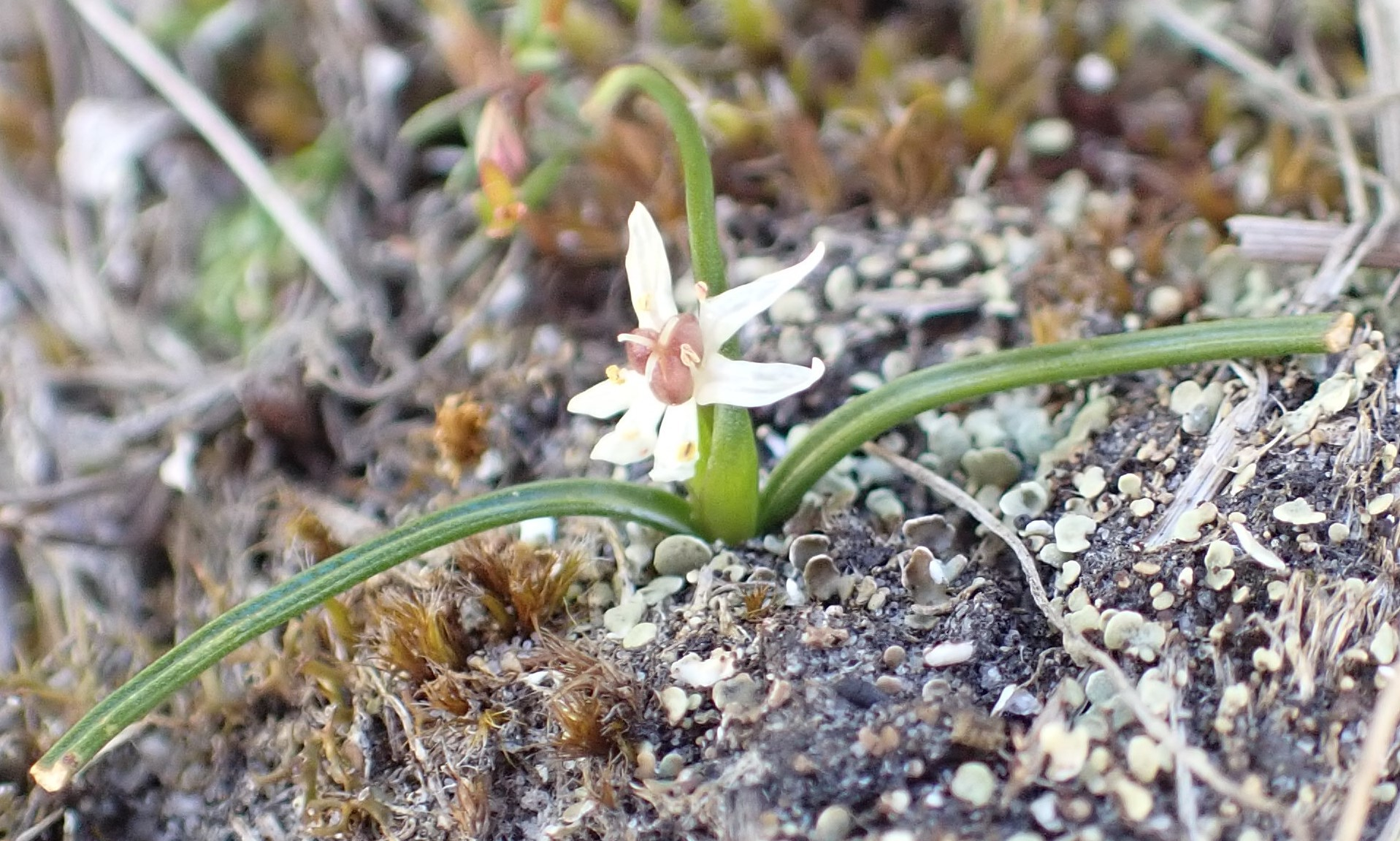

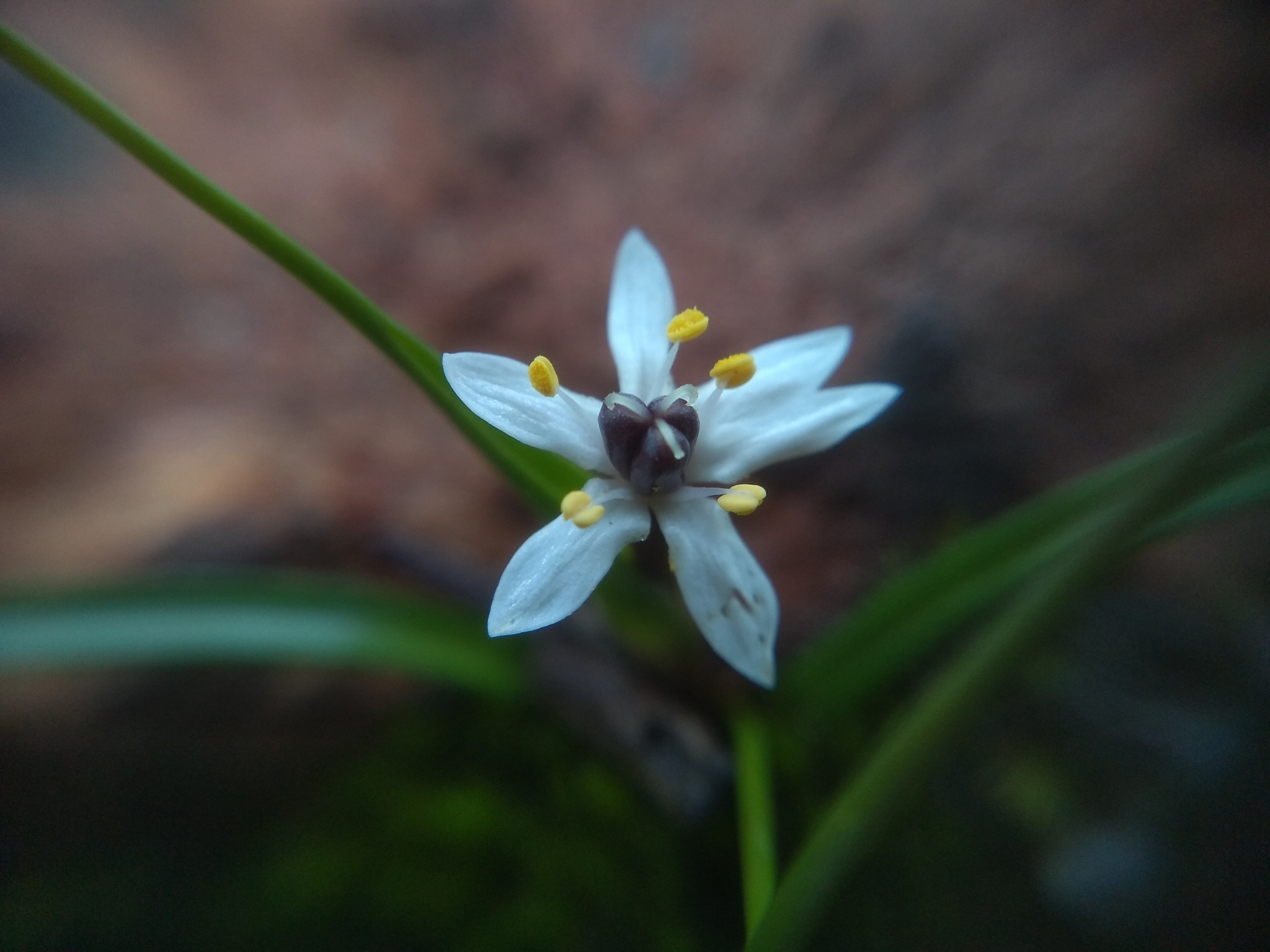
