= Wurmbea fluviatilis =

Scientific classification
- Kingdom: Plantae
- Clade: Embryophytes
- Clade: Tracheophytes
- Clade: Spermatophytes
- Clade: Angiosperms
- Clade: Monocots
- Order: Liliales
- Family: Colchicaceae
- Genus: Wurmbea
- Species: W. fluviatilis

Binomial name
- Wurmbea fluviatilis T.D.Macfarl. & A.L.Case

Species of flowering plant

Wurmbea fluviatilis is a species of plant in the Colchicaceae family that is endemic to Australia. The specific epithet fluviatilis (‘riverine’) refers to the species' riverside habitat.

== Description ==
The species is a cormous perennial herb that grows to a height of 15–55 cm. Its bicoloured dark pink and white to pale pink flowers appear from June to August in years when there has been sufficient rainfall.

== Distribution and habitat ==
The species is found in the Gascoyne IBRA bioregion of north-western Western Australia. It grows in damp clay or sandy-clay soils on riverbanks, sometimes in water at the margins of shallow pools.
