= Thysanotus exfimbriatus =

Scientific classification
- Kingdom: Plantae
- Clade: Tracheophytes
- Clade: Angiosperms
- Clade: Monocots
- Order: Asparagales
- Family: Asparagaceae
- Subfamily: Lomandroideae
- Genus: Thysanotus
- Species: T. exfimbriatus

Binomial name
- Thysanotus exfimbriatus Sirisena, Conran & T.D.Macfarl.

Synonyms
- Murchisonia volubilis Brittan; Thysanotus patersonii var. exfimbriatus J.M.Black nom. inval. p.p.; Thysanotus exiliflorus auct. non F.Muell.: Black, J.M. (1922)

Species of plant

Thysanotus exfimbriatus is a species of flowering plant in the Asparagaceae family, and is endemic to western parts of Australia. It is a distinctive, lily-like, leafless twiner with purple flowers arranged singly or in pairs, lance-shaped sepals, egg-shaped petals that unlike others in the genus lack a fringe, and a spherical to cylindrical ovary.

== Description ==
Thysanotus exfimbriatus is a distinctive, lily-like, leafless plant with sessile, elliptic tubers 30–40 mm (1.2–1.6 in) in diameter and twining stems up to 1 m (3 ft 3 in) long. The flowers are purple and borne singly or in pairs on a peduncle 30–50 mm (1.2–2.0 in) long with two linear to lance-shaped bracts about 2 mm (0.079 in) long at the base. The perianth segments are 2–3.5 mm (0.079–0.138 in) long, the sepals are broadly lance-shaped, 1.0–1.3 mm (0.039–0.051 in) wide, the petals egg-shaped, about 1.5 mm (0.059 in) wide and with T. fragrans are the only two species in the genus that lack a fringe. The anthers are about 1 mm (0.039 in) long with filaments 1.5 mm (0.059 in) long, and the ovary is spherical to cylindrical, about 3 mm (0.12 in) in diameter. Flowering occurs in August and the capsule is more or less spherical, about 3 mm (0.12 in) in diameter containing shining seeds that are shaped like a shallow, ribbed bowl about 1.0–1.5 mm (0.039–0.059 in) in diameter.

== Taxonomy ==
This species was first formally described in 1986 and given the name Murchisonia volubilis in the Flora of South Australia from specimens collected near the North West Coastal Highway by Norman Henry Brittan. In 1987, John McConnell Black transferred the species to Thysanotus as T. patersonii var. exfimbriatus but that name was not valid. In 2016, Udani M. Sirisena, John Conran and Terry Desmond Macfarlane transferred M. volubilis to Thysanotus as T. exfimbriatus (because the name T. volubilis had already been named for a different species) in the journal Nuytsia. The specific epithet (exfimbriatus) "refers to the lack of a fringe on the petals and also acknowledges J.M. Black's first recognition of the taxon as distinct".

== Distribution and habitat ==
Thysanotus exfimbriatus is found from near Geraldton to east of Esperance in the Avon Wheatbelt, Esperance Plains, Geraldton Sandplains, Jarrah Forest, Mallee, Swan Coastal Plain, Warren and Yalgoo bioregions of south-western Western Australia. Along the Darling Range it grows in jarrah-marri forest on soils derived from granite, or with granite rocks in drier inland areas. It also occurs in the Central Ranges, Gawler, Great Victoria Desert and Stony Plains bioregions of South Australia and there is a single record from the MacDonnell Ranges in the Northern Territory.

== Conservation status ==
Thysanotus exfimbriatus is listed as "not threatened" by the Government of Western Australia Department of Biodiversity, Conservation and Attractions.
