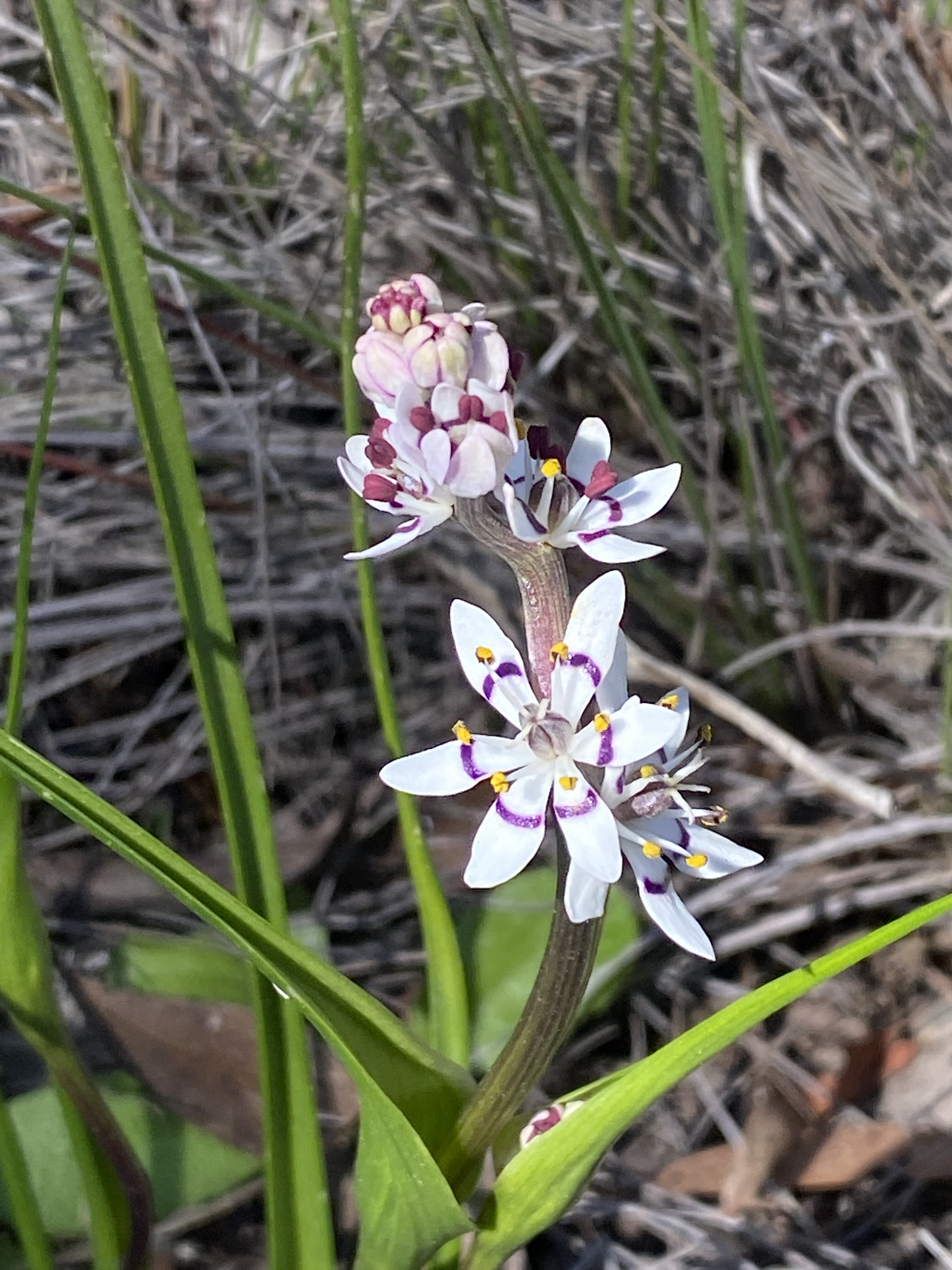
- Near Goulburn, male flowers above female flowers

Scientific classification
- Kingdom: Plantae
- Clade: Embryophytes
- Clade: Tracheophytes
- Clade: Spermatophytes
- Clade: Angiosperms
- Clade: Monocots
- Order: Liliales
- Family: Colchicaceae
- Genus: Wurmbea
- Species: W. dioica

Binomial name
- Wurmbea dioica (R.Br.) F.Muell.

Synonyms
- Anguillaria australis F.Muell. nom. illeg. p.p.; Anguillaria dioica R.Br.; Wurmbea dioicea F.Muell. orth. var.

= Wurmbea dioica =

Early Nancy

Species of plant

Wurmbea dioica, commonly known as early Nancy, is a species of plant in the family Colchicaceae and is endemic to Australia. It is a herb with three linear to thread-like leaves and usually two to seven white flowers with a purple or greenish nectary band.

== Description ==
Wurmbea dioica is a herb that typically grows to a height of 3.5–40 cm (1.4–15.7 in) and has three linear to thread-like or tapering leaves 10–350 mm (0.39–13.78 in) long and 0.2–6 mm (0.0079–0.2362 in) wide with a sheathing base. Individual plants may have male-only, female-only or both male and female flowers and sometimes bisexual flowers. There are up to fifteen flowers on each plant, each with six elliptic white tepals 3.5–11.5 mm (0.14–0.45 in) long. Each tepal has a purple to greenish or white nectary band one-quarter to half the length from its base. The stamens are half to two-thirds as long as the tepals and the anthers are about 1 mm (0.039 in) long and red or purple. Flowering occurs mainly from June to November and the fruit is a capsule 5–10 mm (0.20–0.39 in) long.

== Taxonomy ==
This species was first formally described in 1810 by Robert Brown who gave it the name Anguillaria dioica and published the description in Prodromus Florae Novae Hollandiae et Insulae Van Diemen. In 1877, Ferdinand von Mueller changed the name to Wurmbea dioica in Fragmenta Phytographiae Australiae.

The names of three subspecies are accepted by the Australian Plant Census:

- Wurmbea dioica subsp. alba T.D.Macfarl. has all-white tepals;
- Wurmbea dioica subsp. brevifolia R.J.Bates is distinguished by its short, egg-shaped upper leaf and pink-edged tepals;
- Wurmbea dioica (R.Br.) F.Muell. subsp. dioica has an elongated upper leaf with a tapering or thread-like tip and a purple nectary band.

== Distribution and habitat ==
Wurmbea dioica is widespread and common in all six Australian states and the Australian Capital Territory but is not known from the Northern Territory. It grows in a wide variety of habitats. Subspecies dioica is the most common subspecies, occurring in all eastern states, South Australia and the Australian Capital Territory. Subspecies brevifolia is found in Victoria and South Australia, growing in drier places that subsp. dioica, and subsp. alba is restricted to Western Australia where it grows in winter-wet swamps and around granite rocks.
