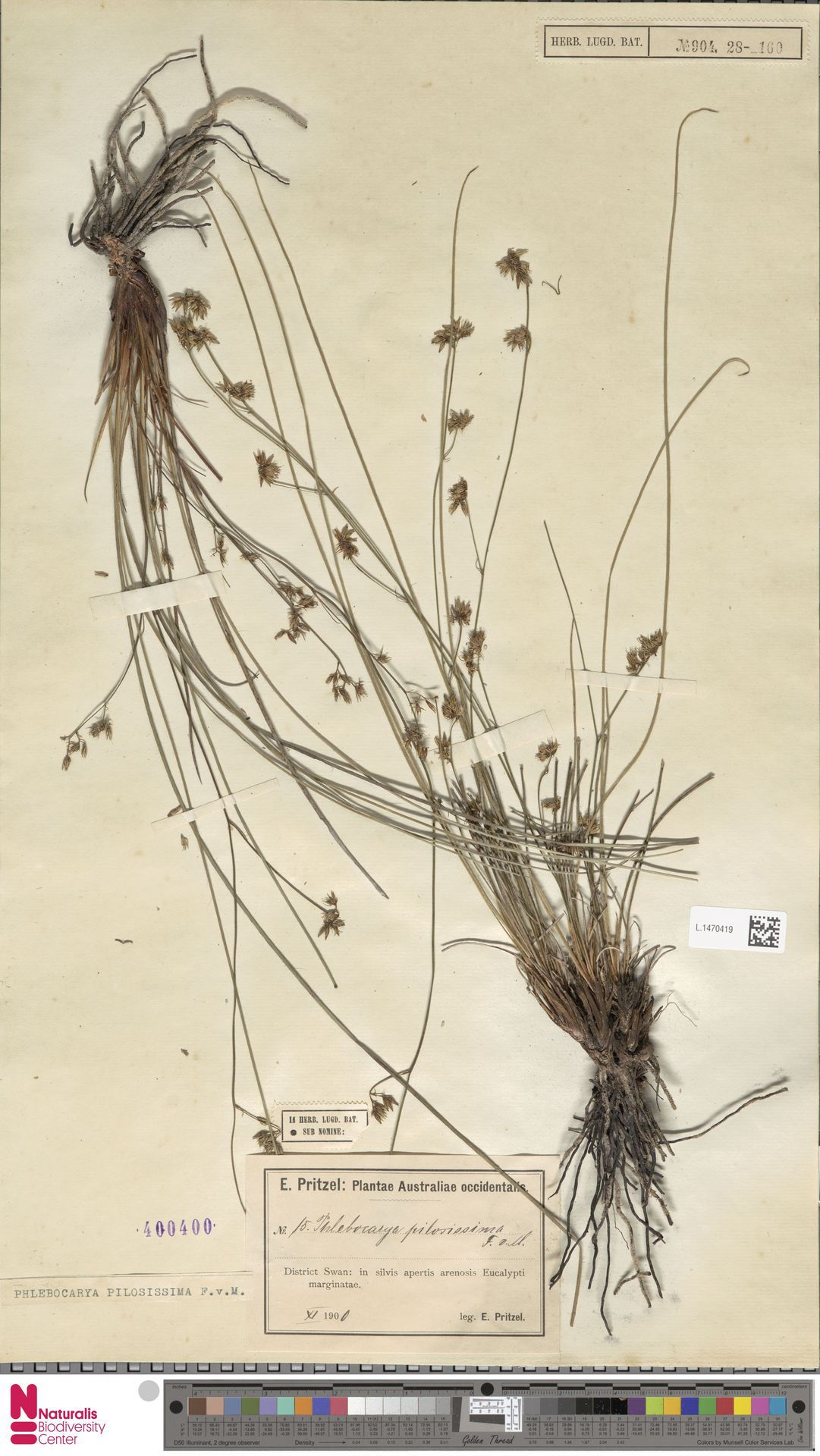

Scientific classification
- Kingdom: Plantae
- Clade: Tracheophytes
- Clade: Angiosperms
- Clade: Monocots
- Clade: Commelinids
- Order: Commelinales
- Family: Haemodoraceae
- Genus: Phlebocarya
- Species: P. pilosissima

Binomial name
- Phlebocarya pilosissima (F.Muell.) Benth.

Synonyms
- Phlebocarya ciliata var. pilosissima F.Muell.

= Phlebocarya pilosissima =

Species of flowering plant

Phlebocarya pilosissima is a plant in the Haemodoraceae family, native to Western Australia.

== Description ==
Phlebocarya pilosissima has flattened to terete leaves. The leaf blade is 14-35 cm by 0.6-2 mm. Leaf surfaces can be smooth to densely covered with sharp rigid bristly hairs (and on the margins). The flower heads vary from being about half as long to longer than the leaves. The scape is hairy and the bracts have branched hairs along the margin, while the pedicels are densely hairy. The style is trifid and there are three stigmas.

== Taxonomy & etymology ==
The plant was first described as Phlebocarya ciliata var pilosissima by Ferdinand von Mueller in 1873, but later in 1873 George Bentham erected it to the species Phlebocarya pilosissima. The species epithet, pilosissima, comes from the Latin, pilus ("hair") which gives the adjective, pilosus, and its superlative, pilosissima, thus describing the plant as being the "hairiest".
