= Thysanotus fragrans =

Conservation status
- Priority Two — Poorly Known Taxa (DEC)

Scientific classification
- Kingdom: Plantae
- Clade: Tracheophytes
- Clade: Angiosperms
- Clade: Monocots
- Order: Asparagales
- Family: Asparagaceae
- Subfamily: Lomandroideae
- Genus: Thysanotus
- Species: T. fragrans

Binomial name
- Thysanotus fragrans (N.H.Brittan) Sirisena, Conran & T.D.Macfarl.

Species of plant

Thysanotus fragrans is a species of flowering plant in the Asparagaceae family, and is endemic to the north-west of Western Australia. It is a perennial herb, with six to sixteen linear, terete leaves, greenish-white flowers, six tepals, the inner tepals fringed, six stamens and an erect, straight style.

== Description ==
Thysanotus fragrans is a perennial herb with cylindrical tubers 30–100 mm (1.2–3.9 in) long, and many fibrous roots. It has six to sixteen linear, terete leaves 30–33 cm (12–13 in) long and 1–2 mm (0.039–0.079 in) wide and channelled at the base. The flowers are borne in a few umbels each with about five flowers, on a flowering stem 12–14 cm (4.7–5.5 in) long, each flower on a pedicel 10 mm (0.39 in) long. The flowers are greenish-white, the outer tepals lance-shaped, 2.5 mm (0.098 in) wide, the petals lance-shaped and 3 mm (0.12 in) wide with a loose fringe on the outer part. There are six stamens, the anthers dark purple, about 3 mm (0.12 in) long, the ovary is more or less cylindrical, and the style is erect and straight. The capsule is cylindrical, about 5 mm (0.20 in) long and 3 mm (0.12 in) wide containing black seeds about 1.5 mm (0.059 in) in diameter with an aril.

== Taxonomy ==
This species was first formally described in 1972 by Norman Henry Brittan who gave it the name Murchisonia fragrans in the Journal of the Royal Society of Western Australia from specimens he collected near the 390 mile peg on the North West Coastal Highway crossing of the Murchison River in 1970. In 2016, Udani M. Sirisena, John Godfrey Conran and Terry Desmond Macfarlane transferred the species to Thysanotus as T. fragrans in the journal Nuytsia. The specific epithet (fragrans) refers to the flowers having a "delicate persistent perfume".

== Distribution and habitat ==
Thysanotus fragrans grows in sandplain vegetation and low mallee eucalypt heath in yellow or gravelly sand near the type location in the Geraldton Sandplains and Yalgoo bioregions of north-western Western Australia.

== Conservation status ==
Thysanotus fragrans is listed as "Priority Two" by the Government of Western Australia Department of Biodiversity, Conservation and Attractions, meaning that it is poorly known and from one or a few locations.
