= Thysanotus acerosifolius =

Conservation status
- Priority Two — Poorly Known Taxa (DEC)

Scientific classification
- Kingdom: Plantae
- Clade: Tracheophytes
- Clade: Angiosperms
- Clade: Monocots
- Order: Asparagales
- Family: Asparagaceae
- Subfamily: Lomandroideae
- Genus: Thysanotus
- Species: T. acerosifolius

Binomial name
- Thysanotus acerosifolius N.H.Brittan

Species of plant

Thysanotus acerosifolius is a species of flowering plant in the Asparagaceae family, and is endemic to the south-west of Western Australia. It is a tufted, perennial herb with yellowish tubers, glabrous, thread-like leaves and panicles of purple flowers, the outer tepals linear with membranous edges, the inner tepals egg-shaped and fringed, and six stamens, the ovary with two ovules per locule.

== Description ==
Thysanotus acerosifolius is a tufted, perennial herb with a rootstock 5–15 mm (0.20–0.59 in) in diameter enclosed by bracts and leaf bases of previous years' growth. The roots are fibrous expanded into yellowish tubers. Ten to fifteen glabrous, thread-like leaves 90–240 mm (3.5–9.4 in) are produced each season. The flowers are borne in panicles 150–300 mm (5.9–11.8 in) tall, usually only branching in the top 20 mm (0.79 in). Each umbel has 3 or 4 flowers, each on a pedicel 6–7 mm (0.24–0.28 in) long. The scape is erect, circular in cross section, and the flowers are purple, the outer tepals linear, 10 mm (0.39 in) long and 1.5 mm (0.059 in) wide and the inner tepals egg-shaped with a fringe 2–3 mm (0.079–0.118 in) wide. There are six stamens and the ovary is sessile with three locules, each with two ovules.

This species resembles T. brevifolius but differs in its shorter, narrower leaves and accumulation of past season's leaf bases.

== Taxonomy ==
Thysanotus acerosifolius was first formally described in 1972 by Norman Henry Brittan in the Journal of the Royal Society of Western Australia from specimens he collected at Pallarup Rocks about 31 km (19 mi) north of Ravensthorpe. The specific epithet (acerosifolius) means 'needle-shaped leaves'.

== Distribution and habitat ==
This species grows between Lake Grace and Lake Pallarup on sandplains in sand, laterite, and clay-loam in the Avon Wheatbelt and Yalgoo bioregions of south-western Western Australia.

== Conservation status ==
Thysanotus acerosifolius is listed as "Priority Two" by the Government of Western Australia Department of Biodiversity, Conservation and Attractions, meaning that it is poorly known and from one or a few locations.
