= Thysanotus glaucifolius =

Scientific classification
- Kingdom: Plantae
- Clade: Tracheophytes
- Clade: Angiosperms
- Clade: Monocots
- Order: Asparagales
- Family: Asparagaceae
- Subfamily: Lomandroideae
- Genus: Thysanotus
- Species: T. glaucifolius

Binomial name
- Thysanotus glaucifolius N.H.Brittan

Species of plant

Thysanotus glaucifolius is a species of flowering plant in the Asparagaceae family, and is endemic to the south of Western Australia. It is a tufted perennial herb, with about ten terete leaves, umbels of purple flowers, oblong sepals, elliptic, fringed petals, three stamens and a straight style.

== Description ==
Thysanotus glaucifolius is a tufted perennial herb with a small rootstock and fibrous roots. Its approximately ten leaves are apparently perennial, about 50–120 mm (2.0–4.7 in) long, 3–4 mm (0.12–0.16 in) wide, terete above and with membranous wings below. The flowers are borne in umbels of four to six, on a flowering stem 120–230 mm (4.7–9.1 in) long, each flower on a pedicel about 10 mm (0.39 in) long. The flowers are purple, the perianth segments 8–12 mm (0.31–0.47 in) long. The sepals are oblong, about 2.0–2.5 mm (0.079–0.098 in) wide and there are three stamens, the anthers 4–5 mm (0.16–0.20 in) long. The style is straight, about 5 mm (0.20 in) long. Flowering occurs from October to December or January, and the seeds are cylindrical, about 2 mm (0.079 in) long and 1 mm (0.039 in) in diameter with a pale yellow, stalked aril.

== Taxonomy ==
Thysanotus glaucifolius was first formally described in 1981 by Norman Henry Brittan in the journal Brunonia from specimens he collected 7 mi (11 km) north of the Kalgan River on the Albany-Borden Road in 1951. The specific epithet (glaucifolius) means 'bluish-green' or 'green-leaved'.

== Distribution and habitat ==
This species of Thysanotus grows in sandplain vegetation in sand and coastal low woodland between Nannup and Esperance in the south of Western Australia.

== Conservation status ==
Thysanotus glaucifolius is listed as "not threatened" by the Government of Western Australia Department of Biodiversity, Conservation and Attractions.
