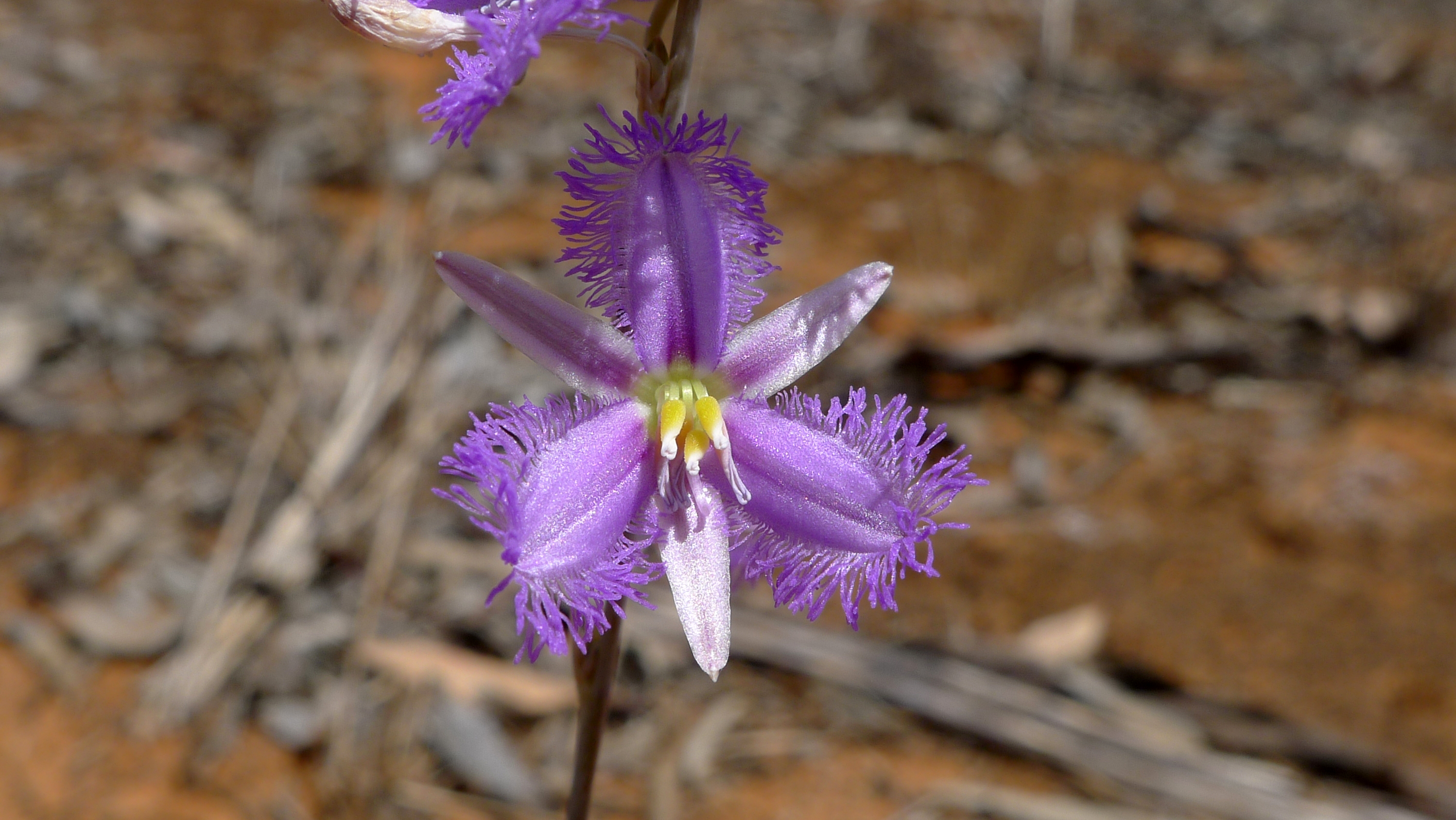

Scientific classification
- Kingdom: Plantae
- Clade: Tracheophytes
- Clade: Angiosperms
- Clade: Monocots
- Order: Asparagales
- Family: Asparagaceae
- Subfamily: Lomandroideae
- Genus: Thysanotus
- Species: T. baueri

Binomial name
- Thysanotus baueri R.Br.

= Thysanotus baueri =

Mallee fringe-lily

Species of plant

Thysanotus baueri commonly known as mallee fringe-lily, is a flowering plant in the family Asparagaceae and grows in Western Australia, South Australia, New South Wales and Victoria. It is an upright perennial forb with purple fringed flowers that are borne on a slender stem.

== Description ==
Thysanotus baueri is an upright perennial with simple or branched stems arising from a narrow, tuberous bulb 8–30 cm (3.1–11.8 in) long. The 3-5 linear leaves are 5–15 cm (2.0–5.9 in) long and arranged around the base and more or less terete shaped. The flowers are terminal with three larger and three smaller purplish petals, larger petals have a fringe on the margins and six stamens. Flowering occurs from spring to early summer and the fruit is a rounded capsule about 4 mm (0.16 in) in diameter containing numerous black seeds.

== Taxonomy and naming ==
This species was first formally described in 1810 by Robert Brown and the description was published in Prodromus Florae Novae Hollandiae et Insulae Van Diemen. The specific epithet (baueri) was probably named after Ferdinand Bauer.

== Distribution and habitat ==
Mallee fringe-lily grows in woodlands and grasslands on sandy soils in New South Wales, Victoria, South Australia and Western Australia.
