= Thysanotus newbeyi =

Conservation status
- Priority Three — Poorly Known Taxa (DEC)

Scientific classification
- Kingdom: Plantae
- Clade: Tracheophytes
- Clade: Angiosperms
- Clade: Monocots
- Order: Asparagales
- Family: Asparagaceae
- Subfamily: Lomandroideae
- Genus: Thysanotus
- Species: T. newbeyi

Binomial name
- Thysanotus newbeyi N.H.Brittan

Species of plant

Thysanotus newbeyi is a species of flowering plant in the Asparagaceae family, and is endemic to inland areas of Western Australia. It is a perennial herb with tuberous roots, prostrate, flat leaves produced annually, a single umbel of two flowers with linear sepals, elliptic, fringed petals, six stamens and a bent style.

== Description ==
Thysanotus newbeyi is a perennial herb with a small rootstock and sessile, tuberous elliptic roots. Its leaves are produced annually, prostrate, flat to slightly channelled, about 40–60 mm (1.6–2.4 in) long. The flowers are borne in an umbels of two flowers, each flower on a pedicel 5–9 mm (0.20–0.35 in) long. The flowers are purple, the perianth segments 4–5 mm (0.16–0.20 in) long. The sepals are more or less linear, 1.5–2.0 mm (0.059–0.079 in) wide and the petals are elliptic, about 2.5 mm (0.098 in) wide with a fringe about 0.5 mm (0.020 in) long. There are six stamens, the anthers about 1.5 mm (0.059 in) long. The style is bent in the opposite direction to the anthers and about 2 mm (0.079 in) long. Flowering occurs in August and September.

== Taxonomy ==
Thysanotus newbeyi was first formally described in 1981 by Norman Henry Brittan in the Flora of Australia from specimens he collected near Gnarlbine Rock, about 28 km (17 mi) south-west of Coolgardie in 1984.

Australian authorities list T. newbeyi as a synonym of Thysanotus speckii.

== Distribution and habitat ==
This species of Thysanotus grows in gravelly sand around the base of granite hills in the Coolgardie and Southern Cross districts of inland Western Australia.
