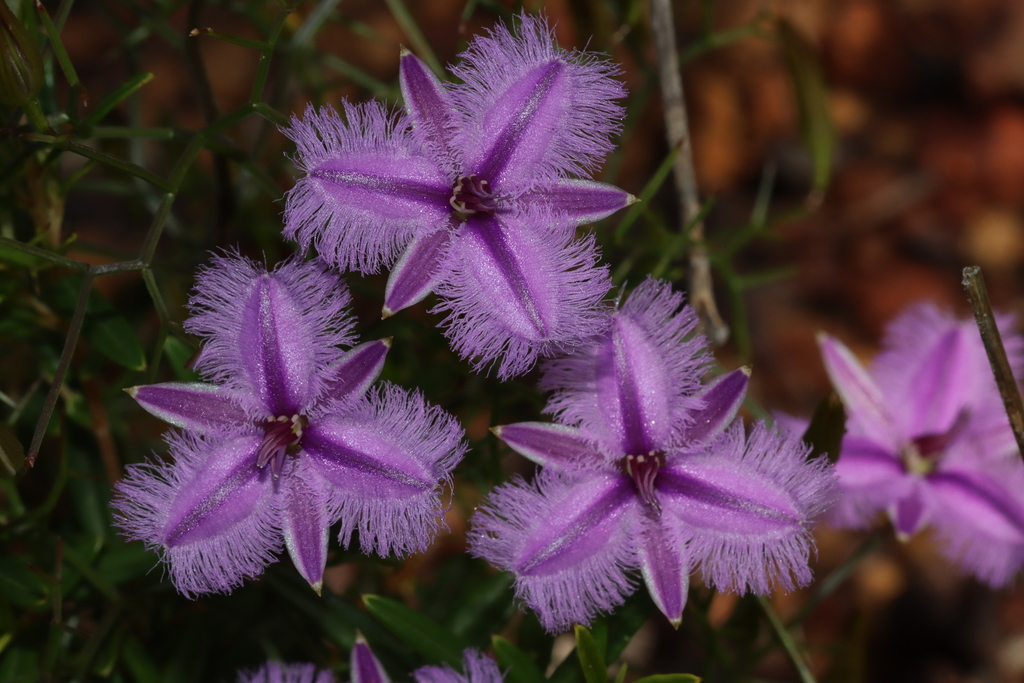
- Near Perth

Scientific classification
- Kingdom: Plantae
- Clade: Tracheophytes
- Clade: Angiosperms
- Clade: Monocots
- Order: Asparagales
- Family: Asparagaceae
- Subfamily: Lomandroideae
- Genus: Thysanotus
- Species: T. fastigiatus

Binomial name
- Thysanotus fastigiatus N.H.Brittan

= Thysanotus fastigiatus =

Species of plant

Thysanotus fastigiatus is a species of flowering plant in the Asparagaceae family, and is endemic to the south-west of Western Australia. It is a rhizomatous, perennial herb, with a few narrowly linear leaves, purple flowers arranged singly with narrowly lance-shaped sepals, elliptic, fringed petals, six stamens and an erect style.

== Description ==
Thysanotus fastigiatus is a perennial herb with a more or less spherical rhizome and fibrous roots. Its few leaves are produced annually, 50–90 mm (2.0–3.5 in) long and wither early, with hairs about 1 mm (0.039 in) long. The flowers are borne singly on stems up to 30–40 cm (12–16 in) long, the side branches 10–15 mm (0.39–0.59 in) long, each flower on a pedicel about 2 mm (0.079 in) long. The flowers are purple, the perianth segments about 8 mm (0.31 in) long with a fringe about 1.0–1.5 mm (0.039–0.059 in) long. The sepals are narrowly lance-shaped, about 2 mm (0.079 in) wide. There are six stamens, the anthers slightly twisted and about 4 mm (0.16 in) long, and the style is erect, about 4 mm (0.16 in) long. Flowering occurs in November and December.

== Taxonomy ==
Thysanotus fastigiatus was first formally described in 1981 by Norman Henry Brittan in Brunonia from specimens he collected about 21 km (13 mi) east-south-east of Perth in 1974. The specific epithet (fastigiatus) means 'fastigiate'.

== Distribution and habitat ==
This species grows in limestone gravel towards the top of the Darling Range in low eucalypt-banksia woodland east of Perth, in the Jarrah Forest and Swan Coastal Plain bioregions of south-western Western Australia.

== Conservation status ==
Thysanotus fastigiatus is listed as "not threatened" by the Government of Western Australia Department of Biodiversity, Conservation and Attractions.
