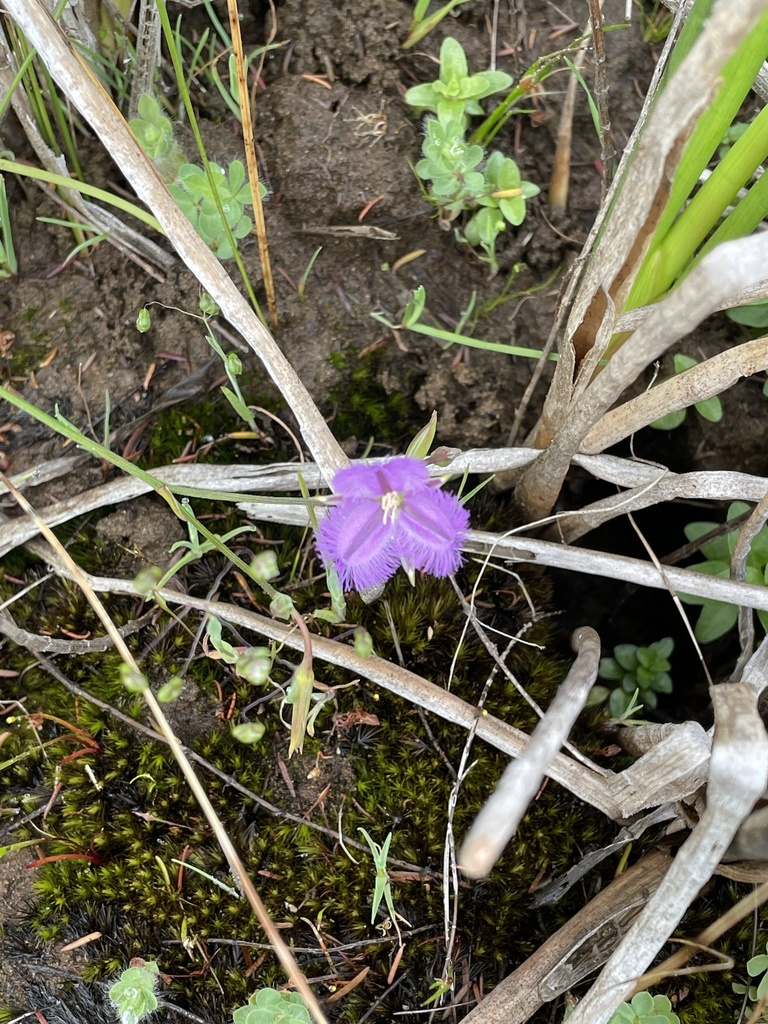

Scientific classification
- Kingdom: Plantae
- Clade: Embryophytes
- Clade: Tracheophytes
- Clade: Spermatophytes
- Clade: Angiosperms
- Clade: Monocots
- Order: Asparagales
- Family: Asparagaceae
- Subfamily: Lomandroideae
- Genus: Thysanotus
- Species: T. tenellus

Binomial name
- Thysanotus tenellus Endl.

= Thysanotus tenellus =

Species of flowering plant

Thysanotus tenellus, commonly known as grassy fringe-lily, is a species of flowering plant in the Asparagaceae family, and is endemic to the south-west of Australia. It is a tufted perennial herb with a small rootstock, tuberous roots, about 5 to 27 linear, usually hairy, channnelled leaves and umbels of up to four purple, sometimes white flowers with lance-shaped sepals, elliptic, fringed petals and six stamens.

== Description ==
Thysanotus tenellus is a perennial herb with a small rootstock. Its roots are tuberous, the tubers stalked about 10–15 mm (0.39–0.59 in) long. Five to 27 leaves are produced annually, channelled and ridged on the lower surface, 100–280 mm (3.9–11.0 in) long with the edges usually hairy. The flowers are borne in panicles 70–440 mm (2.8–17.3 in) long with up to four umbels, each flower on a pedical 8–17 mm (0.31–0.67 in) long. The perianth segments are 6.5–13 mm (0.26–0.51 in) long, the sepals lance-shaped, about 2.5 mm (0.098 in) wide and the petals are purple, sometimes white, about 5.5 mm (0.22 in) wide with a fringe about 4 mm (0.16 in) wide. There are six stamens, the outer three anthers 2–4 mm (0.079–0.157 in) long and the three inner anthers 2.5–5 mm (0.098–0.197 in) long. The style is about 4 mm (0.16 in) long. Flowering occurs from September to November, and the seeds are more or less spherical, about 1.5 mm (0.059 in) in diameter with a straw-coloured aril.

== Taxonomy ==
Thysanotus tenellus was first formally described in 1846 by Stephan Endlicher in Lehmann's Plantae Preissianae from specimens collected in October 1840. The specific epithet (tenellus) means 'delicate'.

== Distribution and habitat ==
This species of Thysanotus grows in granite, loam, sandy clay or sand in swamps, in the Avon Wheatbelt, Esperance Plains, Jarrah Forest, Swan Coastal Plain and Warren bioregions of south-western Western Australia and in South Australia.

== Conservation status ==
Thysanotus tenellus is listed as 'not threatened' by the Western Australian Government Department of Biodiversity, Conservation and Attractions.
