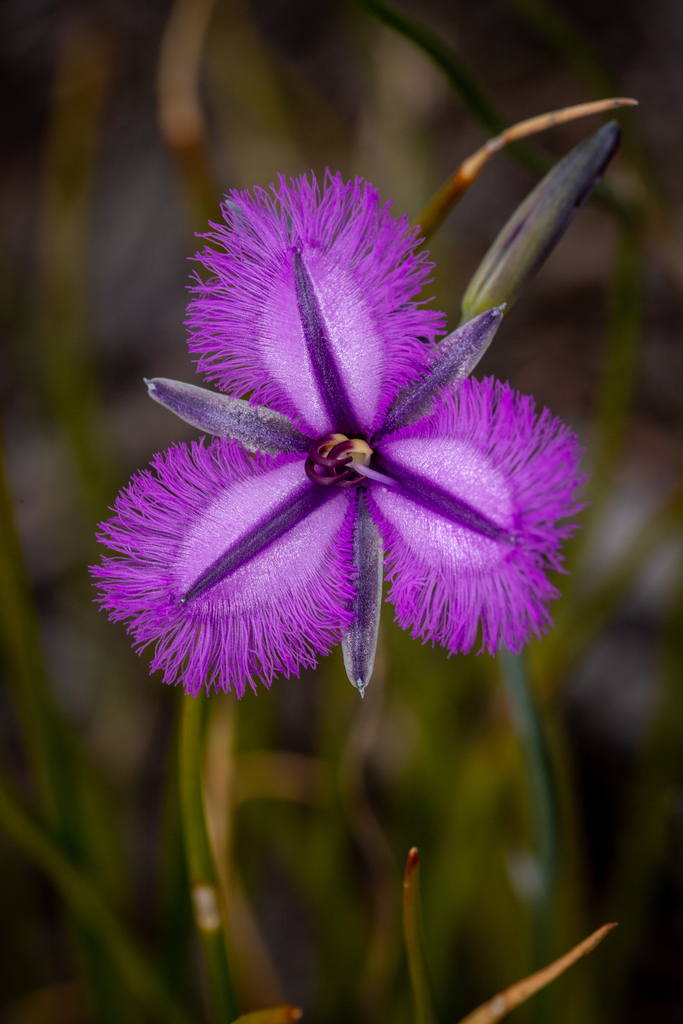

Scientific classification
- Kingdom: Plantae
- Clade: Embryophytes
- Clade: Tracheophytes
- Clade: Spermatophytes
- Clade: Angiosperms
- Clade: Monocots
- Order: Asparagales
- Family: Asparagaceae
- Subfamily: Lomandroideae
- Genus: Thysanotus
- Species: T. teretifolius

Binomial name
- Thysanotus teretifolius N.H.Brittan

= Thysanotus teretifolius =

Species of plant

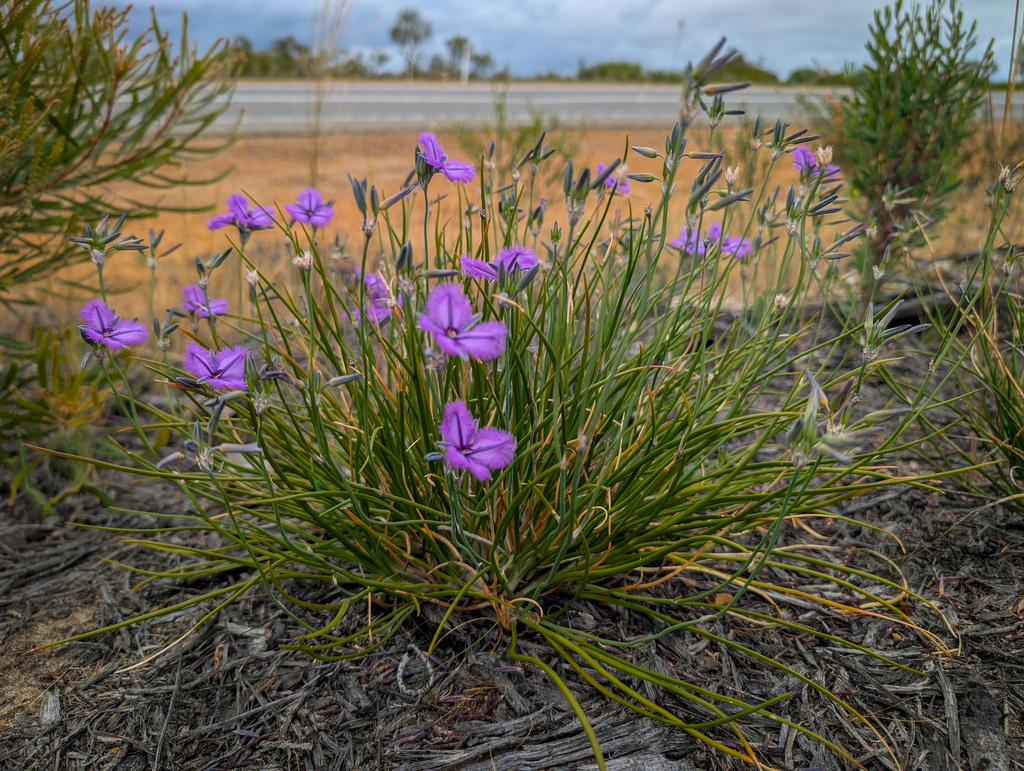
Habit near Eneabba

Thysanotus teretifolius is a species of flowering plant in the Asparagaceae family, and is endemic to the south-west of Western Australia. It is a tufted perennial herb with a small rootstock, fibrous roots, up to ten linear, perennial linear leaves and umbels of ten to fifteen purple flowers with narrowly lance-shaped sepals, elliptic fringed petals and three stamens with equal anthers.

== Description ==
Thysanotus teretifolius is a tufted perennial herb with a small rootstock and fibrous roots. It has up to ten perennial linear, terete, more or less striated leaves up to 120–200 mm (4.7–7.9 in) long and 1.0–1.5 mm (0.039–0.059 in) wide. The flowers are borne in an umbel with ten to fifteen flowers on a pedicel 11–12 mm (0.43–0.47 in) long. The perianth segments are 11–12 mm (0.43–0.47 in) long, the sepals narrowly lance-shaped, about 3 mm (0.12 in) wide, and the petals elliptic, 6–7 mm (0.24–0.28 in) wide, with a fringe about 4 mm (0.16 in) long. There are three stamens, the anthers about 5–6 mm (0.20–0.24 in) long and curved, the style curved and bent sideways, about 5–6 mm (0.20–0.24 in) long. Flowering occurs from September to November.

== Taxonomy ==
Thysanotus teretifolius was first formally described in 1972 by Norman Henry Brittan in the Journal of the Royal Society of Western Australia from specimens collected he collected about 18 mi (29 km) north of Eneabba in 1968. The specific epithet (teretifolius) means 'terete-leaved'.

== Distribution and habitat ==
This species of Thysanotus grows in sandplain vegetation in mallee eucalypts, usually in deep sandy soils, from near Northampton to near Mount Lesueur and south-east to Wongan Hills, in the Avon Wheatbelt, Geraldton Sandplains and Swan Coastal Plain bioregions of south-western Western Australia.

== Conservation status ==
Thysanotus teretifolius is listed as "not threatened" by the Western Australian Government Department of Biodiversity, Conservation and Attractions.
