= Thysanotus wangariensis =

Scientific classification
- Kingdom: Plantae
- Clade: Embryophytes
- Clade: Tracheophytes
- Clade: Spermatophytes
- Clade: Angiosperms
- Clade: Monocots
- Order: Asparagales
- Family: Asparagaceae
- Subfamily: Lomandroideae
- Genus: Thysanotus
- Species: T. wangariensis

Binomial name
- Thysanotus wangariensis Brittan

Species of plant

Thysanotus wangariensis, commonly known as Eyre Peninsula fringe-lily, is a species of flowering plant in the Asparagaceae family, and is endemic to South Australia. It is a perennial herb with a small rhizome, fibrous roots, several branched stems with umbels of up to three purple flowers with linear sepals, elliptic, fringed petals and six stamens with anthers of different lengths.

== Description ==
Thysanotus wangariensis is a perennial herb with a small rhizome 5–10 mm (0.20–0.39 in) in diameter and fibrous roots. It has a few leaves 50–70 mm (2.0–2.8 in) long that wither before flowering. There are several branched, ridged, perennial stems 200–500 mm (7.9–19.7 in) long with hairs on the ridges. The flowers are borne in umbels with up to three flowers, each flower on a pedicel 8–10 mm (0.31–0.39 in) long. The perianth segments are 11–12.5 mm (0.43–0.49 in) long, the sepal linear, 3–4 mm (0.12–0.16 in) long. The petals are purple, elliptic, about 4 mm (0.16 in) wide with a fringe 3.0–3.5 mm (0.12–0.14 in) long. There are six stamens with twisted anthers, the outer 3 anthers about 3 mm (0.12 in) long, the inner ones 6–7 mm (0.24–0.28 in) long and curved, and the style is 10 mm (0.39 in) long. The seeds are elliptic, 2 mm (0.079 in) long and 1.5 mm (0.059 in) in diameter with a yellow aril.

== Taxonomy ==
Thysanotus wangariensis was first formally described in 1978 by Norman Henry Brittan in Transactions of the Royal Society of South Australia, from specimens collected in Hundred of Lake Wangary near the Wangary Hotel.

== Distribution and habitat ==
Eyre Peninsula fringe-lily grows in low, heath vegetation in sandy loamy soil, between Wangary and Port Lincoln in the Eyre Peninsula in South Australia.
