= Thysanotus pyramidalis =

Scientific classification
- Kingdom: Plantae
- Clade: Tracheophytes
- Clade: Angiosperms
- Clade: Monocots
- Order: Asparagales
- Family: Asparagaceae
- Subfamily: Lomandroideae
- Genus: Thysanotus
- Species: T. pyramidalis

Binomial name
- Thysanotus pyramidalis N.H.Brittan

Species of plant

Thysanotus pyramidalis is a species of flowering plant in the Asparagaceae family, and is endemic to the south-west of Western Australia. It is a perennial herb with a small rootstock, elliptic tubers, linear leaves, and flowers arranged singly, with lance-shaped sepals, elliptic, fringed petals and six stamens of differing lengths.

== Description ==
Thysanotus pyramidalis is a perennial herb with a small rootstock, elliptic, more or less sessile tubers about 30–40 mm (1.2–1.6 in) long and six to eight linear, flat leaves 120–160 mm (4.7–6.3 in) long but that wither near flowering time. The flowers are usually borne singly in panicles on a flowering stem 180–300 mm (7.1–11.8 in) long, each flower on a pedicel 3–4 mm (0.12–0.16 in) long. The flowers are purple, the perianth segments 9–10 mm (0.35–0.39 in) long. The sepals are lance-shaped, about 2 mm (0.079 in) wide and the petals are elliptic, 4.0–4.5 mm (0.16–0.18 in) wide with a fringe 1 mm (0.039 in) long. There are six stamens, the outer three anthers, 3.5 mm (0.14 in) long, the inner three 4 mm (0.16 in) long and slightly curved. The style is curved, about 5 mm (0.20 in) long. Flowering occurs from August to October, and the seeds are elliptic, about 1.5 mm (0.059 in) long and 1.0 mm (0.039 in) in diameter with a dark, straw-coloured aril.

== Taxonomy ==
Thysanotus pyramidalis was first formally described in 1972 by Norman Henry Brittan in the Journal of the Royal Society of Western Australia from specimens he collected 65 mi (105 km) north-east of Wubin in 1958. The specific epithet (pyramidalis) means 'pyramid-shaped', referring to the shape of the inflorescence.

== Distribution and habitat ==
This species of Thysanotus grows in sand, loam, laterite and sandy clay, often in damp sites, in sandplain and mulga (Acacia aneura) communities from near Geraldton to the Three Springs area and near Perth, in the Avon Wheatbelt, Coolgardie, Esperance Plains, Geraldton Sandplains, Jarrah Forest, Murchison and Yalgoo bioregions of south-western Western Australia.

== Conservation status ==
Thysanotus pyramidalis is listed as "not threatened" by the Government of Western Australia Department of Biodiversity, Conservation and Attractions.
