= Thysanotus sabulosus =

Conservation status
- Priority One — Poorly Known Taxa (DEC)

Scientific classification
- Kingdom: Plantae
- Clade: Tracheophytes
- Clade: Angiosperms
- Clade: Monocots
- Order: Asparagales
- Family: Asparagaceae
- Subfamily: Lomandroideae
- Genus: Thysanotus
- Species: T. sabulosus

Binomial name
- Thysanotus sabulosus N.H.Brittan

Species of plant

Thysanotus sabulosus is a species of flowering plant in the Asparagaceae family, and is endemic to the south-west of Western Australia. It is a perennial herb with a cylindrical rootstock, fibrous roots, about twelve perennial leaves and umbels of up to three flowers with narrowly elliptic sepals, egg-shaped, fringed petals and six stamens of differing lengths.

== Description ==
Thysanotus sabulosus is a perennial herb with a cylindrical rootstock about 5 mm (0.20 in) in diameter, fibrous roots, and about twelve apparently perennial leaves, the innermost leaves 40–50 mm (1.6–2.0 in) long and the outermost leaves almost bract-like. The flowers are borne in panicles about 200 mm (7.9 in) long with umbels of up to three flowers, each on a pedicel 3–6 mm (0.12–0.24 in) long. The perianth segments are 10–12 mm (0.39–0.47 in) long, the sepals narrowly elliptic, about 1.5–2.0 mm (0.059–0.079 in) wide, and the petals egg-shaped, about 6 mm (0.24 in) wide, with a fringe 3 mm (0.12 in) long. There are six stamens, the three outer anthers 4 mm (0.16 in) long and the inner anthers 5 mm (0.20 in) long. The style is 5–6 mm (0.20–0.24 in) long. Flowering occurs from October to December, and the seeds are more or less cylindrical, about 1.5 mm (0.059 in) long and 1.0 mm (0.039 in) in diameter, with a stalked, yellow to orange aril.

== Taxonomy ==
Thysanotus sabulosus was first formally described in 1972 by Norman Henry Brittan in the Journal of the Royal Society of Western Australia from specimens he collected 17 mi (27 km) west of Newdegate on the Newdegate-Lake Grace road in 1960. The specific epithet (sabulosus) means 'growing in sandy places'.

== Distribution and habitat ==
This species of Thysanotus grows in deep yellow sand and lateritic gravel on sandplains near Newdegate and Kulin, in the Avon Wheatbelt and Mallee bioregions of south-western Western Australia.

== Conservation status ==
Thysanotus sabulosus is listed as "Priority One" by the Western Australian Government Department of Biodiversity, Conservation and Attractions, meaning it is known from only a few populations that are under immediate threat from known threatening processes.
