= Thysanotus gageoides =

Scientific classification
- Kingdom: Plantae
- Clade: Tracheophytes
- Clade: Angiosperms
- Clade: Monocots
- Order: Asparagales
- Family: Asparagaceae
- Subfamily: Lomandroideae
- Genus: Thysanotus
- Species: T. gageoides

Binomial name
- Thysanotus gageoides Diels

Species of plant

Thysanotus gageoides is a species of flowering plant in the Asparagaceae family, and is endemic to the south of Western Australia. It is a perennial herb, with one or two linear, terete leaves, five to twenty purple flowers with six stamens and a straight style.

== Description ==
Thysanotus gageoides is a perennial herb with cylindrical tubers 20–30 mm (0.79–1.18 in) long and tuberous roots. It has one or two linear, terete, slightly fleshy leaves about 100–200 mm (3.9–7.9 in) long that wither from the tip at about flowering time. Five to twenty purple flowers are usually borne in a single umbel on the end of a flowering stalk 100–170 mm (3.9–6.7 in) long, each flower on a pedicel 12–16 mm (0.47–0.63 in) long. The perianth segments are 9–10 mm (0.35–0.39 in) long, the sepals egg-shaped, 2.5 mm (0.098 in) wide with white edges. The petals are more or less circular, 5–6 mm (0.20–0.24 in) in diameter with a fringe 3.0–3.5 mm (0.12–0.14 in) long. There are six stamens of two different lengths and the style is 3–4 mm (0.12–0.16 in) long. Flowering occurs from October to November, and the seeds are elliptic, about 1.5 mm (0.059 in) long and 1 mm (0.039 in) in diameter with a pale yellow aril.

== Taxonomy ==
Thysanotus gageoides was first formally described in 1904 by Ludwig Diels in Botanische Jahrbücher für Systematik, Pflanzengeschichte und Pflanzengeographie from specimens he collected in the Stirling Range. The specific epithet (gageoides) means Gagea-like.

== Distribution and habitat ==
This species of Thysanotus grows in open low mallee eucalypt vegetation in gravelly to loamy soils in the Stirling Range and south-south-east to near Cape Riche in the Avon Wheatbelt, Esperance Plains, Jarrah Forest and Mallee bioregions of southern Western Australia.

== Conservation status ==
Thysanotus gageoides is listed as "not threatened" by the Government of Western Australia Department of Biodiversity, Conservation and Attractions.
