= Thysanotus parviflorus =

Conservation status
- Priority Four — Rare Taxa (DEC)

Scientific classification
- Kingdom: Plantae
- Clade: Tracheophytes
- Clade: Angiosperms
- Clade: Monocots
- Order: Asparagales
- Family: Asparagaceae
- Subfamily: Lomandroideae
- Genus: Thysanotus
- Species: T. parviflorus

Binomial name
- Thysanotus parviflorus N.H.Brittan

Species of plant

Thysanotus parviflorus is a species of flowering plant in the Asparagaceae family, and is endemic to the south-west of Western Australia. It is a perennial herb with fleshy roots and one or two terete, narrowly linear leaves, umbels of four to six purple flowers with linear sepals, broadly elliptic to circular, fringed petals and six stamens of differing lengths.

== Description ==
Thysanotus parviflorus is a perennial herb with a small rootstock enclosed by bracts and old leaf bases, and has fleshy roots. Its one or two leaves are produced annually, terete, narrowly linear and 100–250 mm (3.9–9.8 in) long. The flowers are borne in an umbel of up to four on a flowering stem 140–250 mm (5.5–9.8 in) long, each flower on a pedicel about 8 mm (0.31 in) long. The flowers are purple, the perianth segments about 7 mm (0.28 in) long. The sepals are linear, about 1.5 mm (0.059 in) wide and the petals are broadly elliptic to circular, 5–6 mm (0.20–0.24 in) wide with a fringe about 2 mm (0.079 in) long. There are six stamens, the three outer anthers 2 mm (0.079 in) long, the inner ones about 3 mm (0.12 in) long. The style is about 3 mm (0.12 in) long. Flowering occurs in October and November. The seeds are 1.5 mm (0.059 in) long and 1 mm (0.039 in) in diameter with a stalked, yellow aril about 1.5 mm (0.059 in) long.

== Taxonomy ==
Thysanotus parviflorus was first formally described in 1972 by Norman Henry Brittan in the Journal of the Royal Society of Western Australia from specimens he collected on West Mount Barren in 1960. The specific epithet (parviflorus) means 'small-flowered'.

== Distribution and habitat ==
This species of Thysanotus grows in low mallee eucalypt sandplain on the lower slopes of hills in sandy-loam soils in southern coastal Western Australia from West Mount Barren to the Stirling Range.

== Conservation status ==
Thysanotus parviflorus is listed as "Priority Four" by the Government of Western Australia Department of Biodiversity, Conservation and Attractions, meaning that is rare or near threatened.
