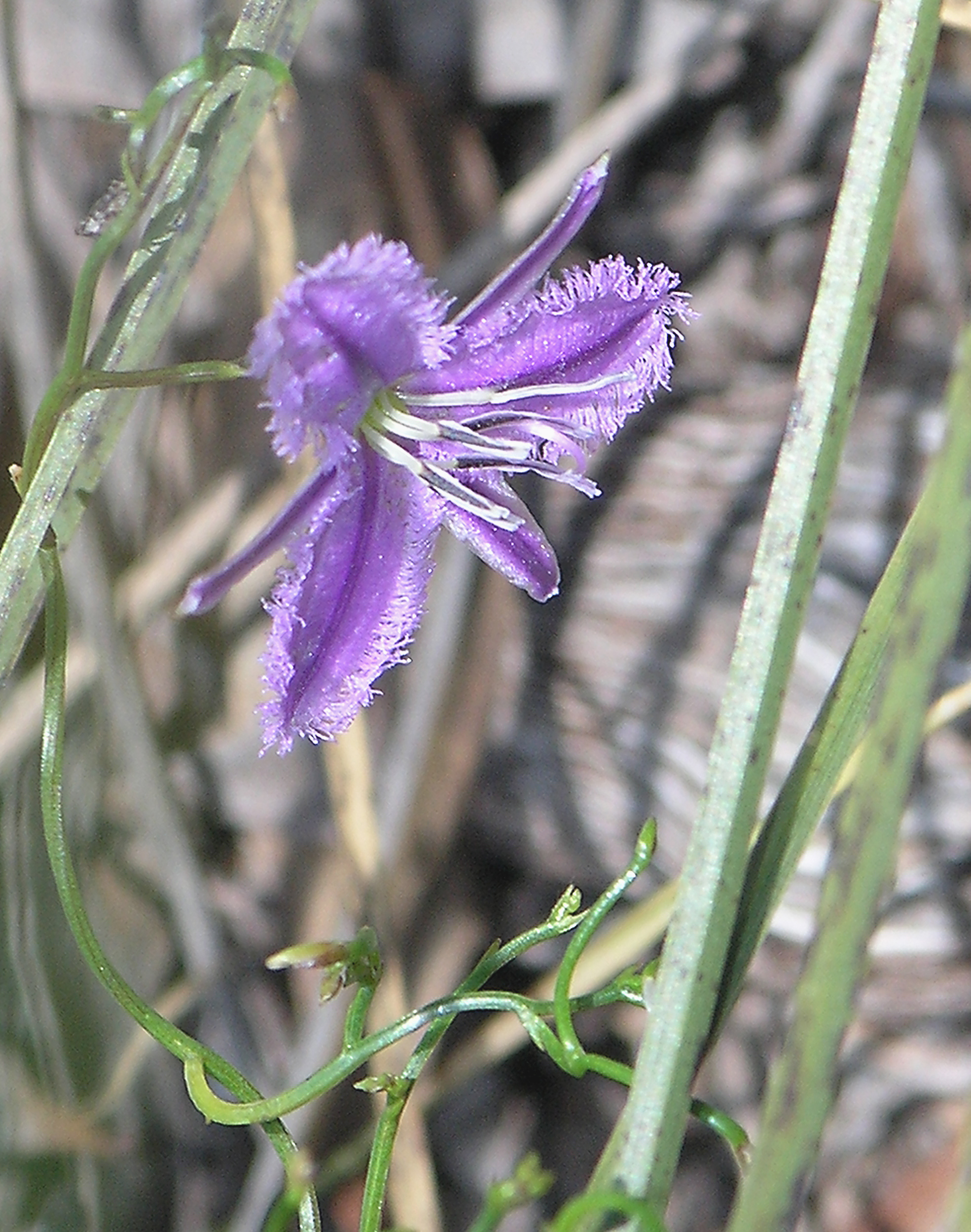
- Thysanotus manglesianus

Scientific classification
- Kingdom: Plantae
- Clade: Embryophytes
- Clade: Tracheophytes
- Clade: Spermatophytes
- Clade: Angiosperms
- Clade: Monocots
- Order: Asparagales
- Family: Asparagaceae
- Subfamily: Lomandroideae
- Genus: Thysanotus; R.Br.

Synonyms
- Chlamysporum Salisb.; Halongia Jeanpl.; Isandra Salisb.; Murchisonia Brittan; Thysanella Salisb.

= Thysanotus =

Genus of herbs

Thysanotus is a genus of about 60 species of flowering plants in the family Asparagaceae, mostly native to Western Australia. Plants in the genus are perennial herbs with bisexual flowers arranged singly or in groups of up to 50, with 6 mauve or blue tepals and the fruit a capsule surrounded by the remains of the perianth.

== Description ==
Plants in the genus Thysanotus are perennial herbs with fibrous roots or a tuber, and sometimes form a rhizome. The leaves are linear and arranged at the base of the plant, sometimes withered when the flowers open, or the plant is leafless. The flowers are arranged singly or in panicles or cymes of up to 50, the six tepals mauve or blue, the outer tepals with a membranous border and the inner tepals with a fringed edge. There are usually six stamens, the ovary usually with two ovules per locule, and the fruit a capsule in the remains of the perianth. The seeds are black with an aril.

== Taxonomy ==
The genus Thysanotus was first formally described in 1810 by Robert Brown in his Prodromus Florae Novae Hollandiae et Insulae Van Diemen. The genus name Thysanotus means 'fringed', referring to the inner tepals.

=== Species list ===
The following is a list of species of Thysanotus accepted by Plants of the World Online as at June 2025:

- Thysanotus acerosifolius Brittan (W.A.)
- Thysanotus admirabilis Jian Wang ter (Qld.)
- Thysanotus anceps Lindl. (W.A.)
- Thysanotus arbuscula Baker (W.A.)
- Thysanotus arenarius Brittan (W.A.)
- Thysanotus argillaceus T.D.Macfarl. & C.J.French (W.A.)
- Thysanotus asper Lindl. - hairy fringe-lily (W.A.)
- Thysanotus banksii R.Br. - (W.A., N.T., Qld, New Guinea)
- Thysanotus baueri R.Br. - mallee fringe-lily (W.A., S.A. Vic., N.S.W.)
- Thysanotus brachiatus Brittan (W.A.)
- Thysanotus brachyantherus Brittan (W.A.)
- Thysanotus brevifolius Brittan (W.A.)
- Thysanotus chinensis Benth. (W.A., N.T., Qld., New Guinea, southern China, northern Vietnam, southern Thailand, Malay Peninsula, Philipinnes, Indonesia)
- Thysanotus cymosus Brittan (W.A.)
- Thysanotus dichotomus (Labill.) R.Br. - branching fringe-lily (W.A.)
- Thysanotus elatior R.Br. (W.A., N.T.)
- Thysanotus ellipsoideus T.D.Macfarl. & C.J.French (W.A.)
- Thysanotus exfimbriatus Sirisema, Conran & T.D.Macfarl. (W.A., S.A., N.T.)
- Thysanotus exiliflorus F.Muell. - desert fringed lily (W.A., S.A., N.T.)
- Thysanotus fastigiatus Brittan (W.A.)
- Thysanotus formosus Brittan (W.A.)
- Thysanotus fractiflexus Brittan – zig-zag fringe-lily (S.A.)
- Thysanotus fragrans (Brittan) Sirisena, Conran & T.D.Macfarl. (W.A.)
- Thysanotus gageoides Diels (W.A.)
- Thysanotus glaucifolius Brittan (W.A.)
- Thysanotus glaucus Endl. (W.A.)
- Thysanotus gracilis R.Br. (W.A.)
- Thysanotus isantherus R.Br. (W.A.)
- Thysanotus juncifolius (Salisb.) J.H.Willis & Court - branching fringe lily (Qld., Vic., N.S.W., S.A.)
- Thysanotus kalbarriensis T.D.Macfarl., C.J.French & Conran – Kalbarri fringe lily (W.A.)
- Thysanotus lavanduliflorus Brittan (W.A.)
- Thysanotus manglesianus Kunth - Mangles' fringed lily (W.A.)
- Thysanotus multiflorus R.Br. - many-flowered fringe lily (W.A.)
- Thysanotus newbeyi Brittan (W.A.)
- Thysanotus nudicaulis Brittan (W.A., S.A.)
- Thysanotus parviflorus Brittan (W.A.)
- Thysanotus patersonii R.Br. - twining fringe-lily, Paterson's fringed lily (W.A., S.A., N.S.W., Vic., Tas.)
- Thysanotus pauciflorus R.Br. - few flowered fringe lily (W.A.)
- Thysanotus prospectus C.J.French & T.D.Macfarl. (W.A.)
- Thysanotus pseudojunceus Brittan (W.A.)
- Thysanotus pyramidalis Brittan (W.A.)
- Thysanotus racemoides Sirisena, T.D.Macfarl. & Conran (S.A., Vic.)
- Thysanotus ramulosus Brittan (W.A.)
- Thysanotus rectantherus Brittan (W.A.)
- Thysanotus sabulosus Brittan (W.A.)
- Thysanotus scaber Endl. (W.A.)
- Thysanotus sparteus R.Br. – leafless fringed lily (W.A.)
- Thysanotus speckii Brittan (W.A.)
- Thysanotus spiniger Brittan (W.A.)
- Thysanotus tenellus Endl. (W.A., S.A.)
- Thysanotus tenuis Lindl. (W.A.)
- Thysanotus teretifolius Brittan (W.A.)
- Thysanotus triandrus (Labill.) R.Br. - three-stamened fringe lily (W.A.)
- Thysanotus tuberosus R.Br. - fringed violet, fringed lily, common fringe lily (Qld., N.S.W., A.C.T., Vic., S.A.)
- Thysanotus unicupensis Sirisena, T.D.Macfarl. & Conran (W.A.)
- Thysanotus vernalis Brittan (W.A.)
- Thysanotus virgatus Brittan (N.S.W.)
- Thysanotus wangariensis Brittan - Eyre Peninsula fringe-lily (S.A.)

== Distribution ==
Species of Thysanotus are mainly native to Australia, but two species (T. banksii and T. tuberosus) also occur on New Guinea, and one species (T. chinensis) is found as far north as China.
