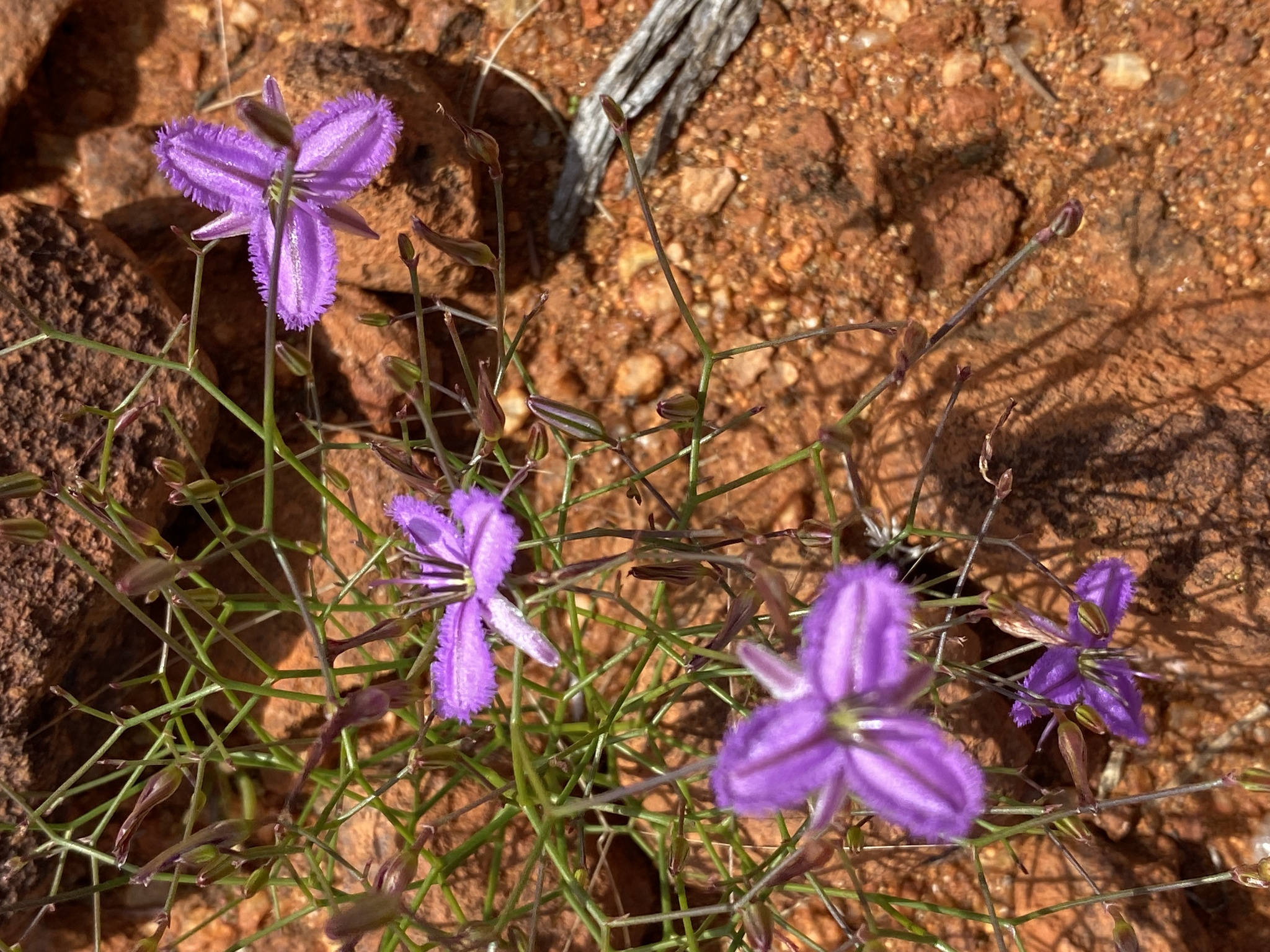

Scientific classification
- Kingdom: Plantae
- Clade: Tracheophytes
- Clade: Angiosperms
- Clade: Monocots
- Order: Asparagales
- Family: Asparagaceae
- Subfamily: Lomandroideae
- Genus: Thysanotus
- Species: T. spiniger

Binomial name
- Thysanotus spiniger N.H.Brittan

= Thysanotus spiniger =

Species of plant

Thysanotus spiniger is a species of flowering plant in the Asparagaceae family, and is endemic to the south-west of Western Australia. It is a perennial herb with a short, thick rhizome, hairy linear leaves at first, and umbels of one or two purple flowers with linear to lance-shaped sepals, elliptic fringed petals and six stamens with equal anthers.

== Description ==
Thysanotus spiniger is a perennial herb with a short, thick rhizome and fibrous roots, the rhizome 30–40 mm (1.2–1.6 in) long and 1.5–2.0 mm (0.059–0.079 in) in diameter. It has linear leaves up to 150 mm (5.9 in) long, and that wither before flowering. The flowers are borne on a stiff, leafless, branched, ridged flowering stem up to 400 mm (16 in) long with umbels of one or two flowers, each on a pedicel 4–6 mm (0.16–0.24 in) long. The perianth segments are about 13 mm (0.51 in) long, the sepals linear to lance-shaped, about 3 mm (0.12 in) wide, and the petals elliptic, 5.0–5.5 mm (0.20–0.22 in) wide, with a fringe 4.0–4.5 mm (0.16–0.18 in) long. There are six stamens, the anthers about 8 mm (0.31 in) long and the style is curved, about 7 mm (0.28 in) long. Flowering occurs from August to November or January.

== Taxonomy ==
Thysanotus spiniger was first formally described in 1960 by Norman Henry Brittan in the Journal of the Royal Society of Western Australia from specimens he collected near the Hill River in 1952. The specific epithet (spiniger) means 'thorn-bearing', referring to the branches.

== Distribution and habitat ==
This species of Thysanotus grows in sandplain vegetation in eucalypt woodland, usually in sandy soils, from south of Dongara to the Moore River in the Avon Wheatbelt, Geraldton Sandplains, Jarrah Forest and Swan Coastal Plain bioregions of south-western Western Australia.

== Conservation status ==
Thysanotus spiniger is listed as "not threatened" by the Western Australian Government Department of Biodiversity, Conservation and Attractions.
