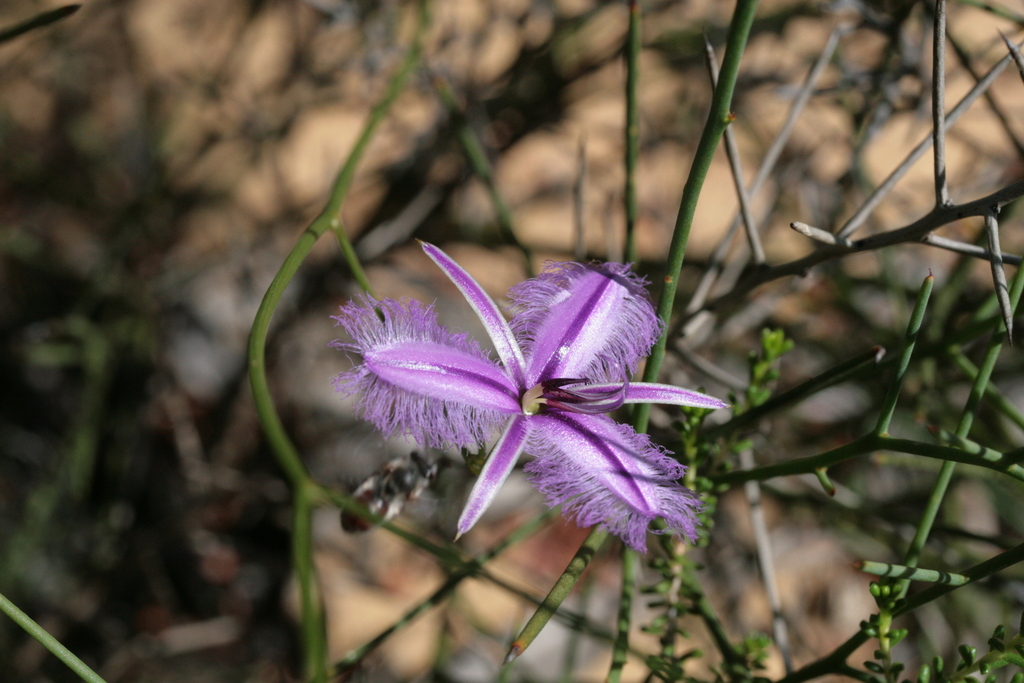
- In Kalbarri National Park

Scientific classification
- Kingdom: Plantae
- Clade: Tracheophytes
- Clade: Angiosperms
- Clade: Monocots
- Order: Asparagales
- Family: Asparagaceae
- Subfamily: Lomandroideae
- Genus: Thysanotus
- Species: T. arenarius

Binomial name
- Thysanotus arenarius N.H.Brittan

= Thysanotus arenarius =

Species of plant

Thysanotus arenarius, commonly known as sand-dune fringed lily, is a species of flowering plant in the Asparagaceae family, and is endemic to near-coastal areas of Western Australia. It is a clumped, rhizomatous, perennial herb with linear leaves, more or less prostrate stems, and umbels of two or three purple flowers with elliptic, fringed petals, narrowly linear sepals, six stamens and a curved style.

== Description ==
Thysanotus arenarius is a perennial herb with rhizomes about 10 mm (0.39 in) in diameter and thick, fibrous roots. Ten to fifteen linear leaves are produced annually, up to 230 mm (9.1 in) long and 3–5 mm (0.12–0.20 in) wide but soon wither. The stems are more or less prostrate, 50–70 cm (20–28 in) long and branched with short hairs near the base. The flowers are borne in umbels of two or three flowers, each on a pedicel about 10 mm (0.39 in) long. The flowers are purple, with perianth segments about 15 mm (0.59 in) long, the sepals narrowly linear, about 15 mm (0.59 in) long, the petals elliptic about 6 mm (0.24 in) long with a fringe about 3 mm (0.12 in) long. There are six curved stamens, the style is curved, about 11 mm (0.43 in) long. Flowering occurs from October to December, and the seeds are more or less spherical, 2.0–2.5 mm (0.079–0.098 in) in diameter with a dull orange aril.

== Taxonomy ==
Thysanotus arenarius was first formally described in 1960 by Norman Henry Brittan in the Journal of the Royal Society of Western Australia from specimens he collected at Cape Naturaliste in 1950. The specific epithet (arenarius) means 'pertaining to, or growing in sand'.

== Distribution and habitat ==
This species grows in sand over limestone in near-coastal areas between Shark Bay and Salt River in the Carnarvon, Geraldton Sandplains, Jarrah Forest and Swan Coastal Plain, Warren and Yalgoo bioregions of Western Australia.

== Conservation status ==
Thysanotus arenarius is listed as "not threatened" by the Government of Western Australia Department of Biodiversity, Conservation and Attractions.
