= Thysanotus glaucus =

Conservation status
- Priority Four — Rare Taxa (DEC)

Scientific classification
- Kingdom: Plantae
- Clade: Tracheophytes
- Clade: Angiosperms
- Clade: Monocots
- Order: Asparagales
- Family: Asparagaceae
- Subfamily: Lomandroideae
- Genus: Thysanotus
- Species: T. glaucus

Binomial name
- Thysanotus glaucus Endl.

Species of plant

Thysanotus glaucus is a species of flowering plant in the Asparagaceae family, and is endemic to the south-west of Western Australia. It is a tufted, glaucous, perennial herb, with about 20 to 30 terete leaves, umbels of up to 10 purple flowers, linear sepals, elliptic, fringed petals, three stamens and a curved style.

== Description ==
Thysanotus glaucus is a tufted, glaucous, perennial herb with a small rootstock and fibrous roots. Its ten to twenty leaves are apparently perennial, about 50–100 mm (2.0–3.9 in) long, 4–5 mm (0.16–0.20 in) wide at the base, terete, and bluish-glaucous at the base. The flowers are borne in panicles 17–21 mm (0.67–0.83 in) long, four or five branched in the upper 4–5 cm (1.6–2.0 in), the umbels with up to ten flowers on a pedicel 6–7 mm (0.24–0.28 in) long. The flowers are purple, the perianth segments 12–13 mm (0.47–0.51 in) long. The sepals are linear, 2.0–2.5 mm (0.079–0.098 in) wide and the petals are elliptic, 5–7 mm (0.20–0.28 in) wide with a fringe 4–6 mm (0.16–0.24 in) long. There are three stamens, the anthers about 7 mm (0.28 in) long. The style is curved, about 6 mm (0.24 in) long. Flowering occurs from October to December or from January to March.

== Taxonomy ==
Thysanotus glaucus was first formally described in 1846 by Stephan Endlicher in Lehmann's Plantae Preissianae from specimens collected at "Bull's Creek" in 1841. The specific epithet (glaucus) means 'having a bluish-grey or -green bloom'.

== Distribution and habitat ==
This species of Thysanotus grows in low woodland, in sand or sandy gravel, from near Jurien Bay to south of Busselton in the Geraldton Sandplains, Jarrah Forest, Mallee and Swan Coastal Plain bioregions of Western Australia.

== Conservation status ==
Thysanotus glaucus is listed as "Priority Four" by the Government of Western Australia Department of Biodiversity, Conservation and Attractions, meaning that is rare or near threatened.
