= Thysanotus formosus =

Conservation status
- Priority One — Poorly Known Taxa (DEC)

Scientific classification
- Kingdom: Plantae
- Clade: Tracheophytes
- Clade: Angiosperms
- Clade: Monocots
- Order: Asparagales
- Family: Asparagaceae
- Subfamily: Lomandroideae
- Genus: Thysanotus
- Species: T. formosus

Binomial name
- Thysanotus formosus N.H.Brittan

Species of plant

Thysanotus formosus is a species of flowering plant in the Asparagaceae family, and is endemic to a small area in the south-west of Western Australia. It is a tufted perennial herb, with three or four terete leaves, large purple flowers, linear sepals, elliptic, fringed petals, six stamens and an erect style.

== Description ==
Thysanotus formosus is a tufted perennial herb with somewhat fleshy horizontal roots. Its three or four leaves are produced annually, about 400 mm (16 in) long and glaucous, surrounded by old leaf bases. The flowers are borne in four or five more or less sessile umbels, each with two or three flowers. The flowers are purple, the outer tepals about 19 mm (0.75 in) long, the petals elliptical with a fringe about 3–4 mm (0.12–0.16 in) long. The sepals are linear, about 3 mm (0.12 in) wide and there are six stamens, the anthers slightly twisted and about 4 mm (0.16 in) long, the style is about 10 mm (0.39 in) long. The capsule is cylindrical, 6–7 mm (0.24–0.28 in) long and 4–5 mm (0.16–0.20 in) wide containing black seeds with a yellow aril This species is distinguished from others in the genus, by its large flowers, borne in sessile umbels.

== Taxonomy ==
Thysanotus formosus was first formally described in 1960 by Norman Henry Brittan in the Journal of the Royal Society of Western Australia from specimens he collected 26 mi (42 km) west of Nannup in 1953. The specific epithet (formosus) means 'beautiful', on account of form.

== Distribution and habitat ==
This species of Thysanotus is only known from an area about 42 km (26 mi) south-west of Nannup where it grows in heavy clay soils that are often inundated in winter, in jarrah forest, in the Jarrah Forest bioregion of south-western Western Australia.

== Conservation status ==
Thysanotus formosus is listed as "Priority One" by the Government of Western Australia Department of Biodiversity, Conservation and Attractions, meaning that it is known from only one or a few locations that are potentially at risk.
