= Thysanotus vernalis =

Conservation status
- Priority Three — Poorly Known Taxa (DEC)

Scientific classification
- Kingdom: Plantae
- Clade: Embryophytes
- Clade: Tracheophytes
- Clade: Spermatophytes
- Clade: Angiosperms
- Clade: Monocots
- Order: Asparagales
- Family: Asparagaceae
- Subfamily: Lomandroideae
- Genus: Thysanotus
- Species: T. vernalis

Binomial name
- Thysanotus vernalis N.H.Brittan

Species of plant

Thysanotus vernalis is a species of flowering plant in the Asparagaceae family, and is endemic to the south-west of Western Australia. It is a perennial herb with a small rootstock, tuberous roots, one or two linear, channelled leaves and umbels of two to six purple flowers with narrowly lance-shaped sepals, elliptic fringed petals and six stamens with anthers of differing lengths.

== Description ==
Thysanotus vernalis is a perennial herb with a small rootstock and tuberous roots about 25 mm (0.98 in) long. It has one or two annual linear, channelled leaves 100–250 mm (3.9–9.8 in) long. The flowers are borne in panicles with umbel of two to six flowers on a pedicel 4–5 mm (0.16–0.20 in) long. The perianth segments are about 10 mm (0.39 in) long, the sepals narrowly lance-shaped, about 1.5 mm (0.059 in) wide, and the petals elliptic, about 5 mm (0.20 in) wide, with a fringe 4–5 mm (0.16–0.20 in) long. There are six stamens, the three outer anthers twisted and 2.5–3.0 mm (0.098–0.118 in) long, the three inner ones about 4 mm (0.16 in) long. The style is about 3.5 mm (0.14 in) long. Flowering occurs in September and October.

== Taxonomy ==
Thysanotus vernalis was first formally described in 1960 by Norman Henry Brittan in the Journal of the Royal Society of Western Australia from specimens he collected south of Mount Lesueur in 1955. The specific epithet (vernalis) means 'appearing in spring'.

== Distribution and habitat ==
This species of Thysanotus grows in sandplain vegetation dominated by mallee eucalypts and in Wandoo woodland in the area around Mount Lesueur, in the Geraldton Sandplains bioregion of south-western Western Australia.

== Conservation status ==
Thysanotus vernalis is listed as "Priority Three" by the Government of Western Australia Department of Parks and Wildlife, meaning that it is poorly known and known from only a few locations but is not under imminent threat.
