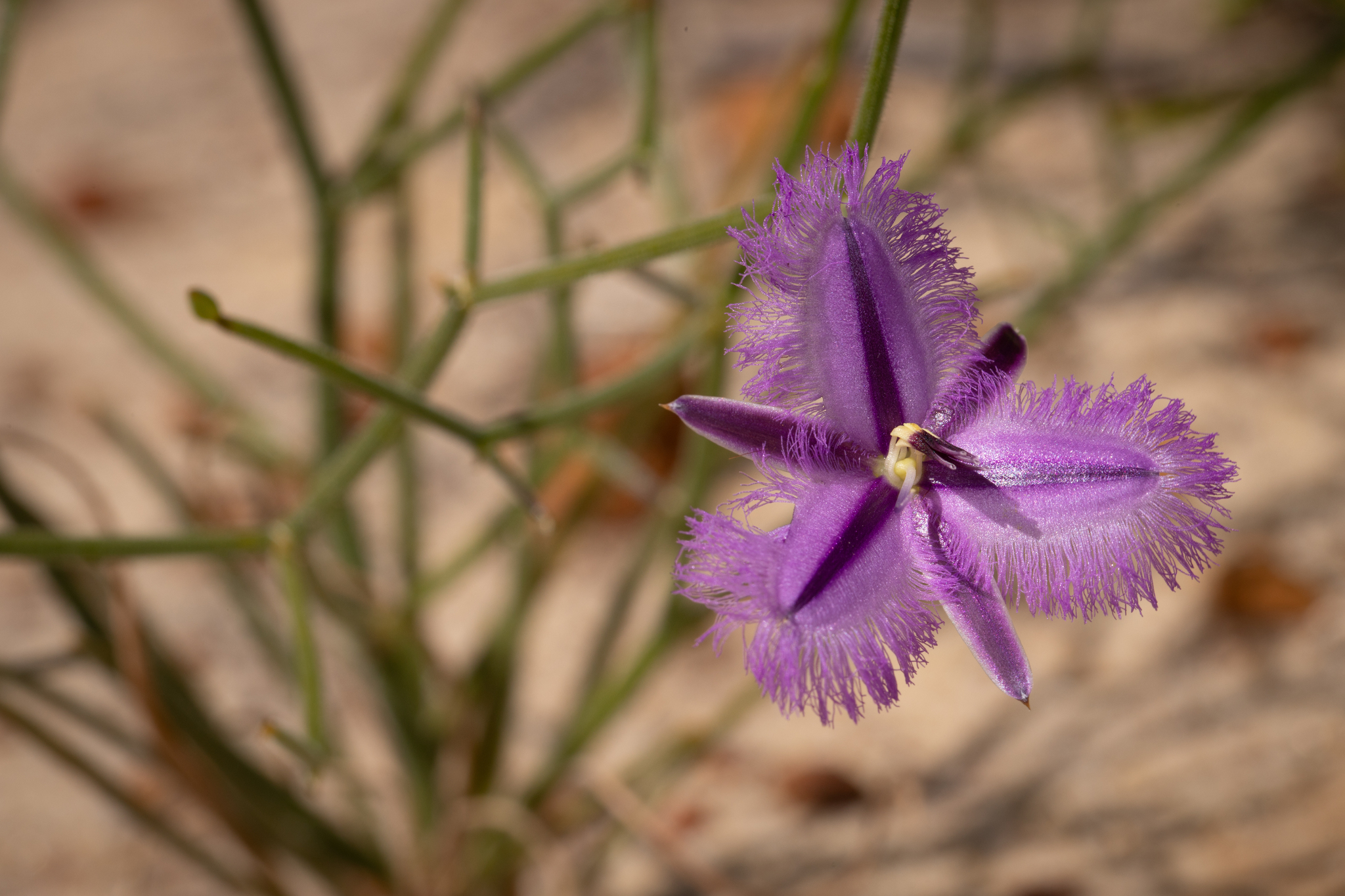

Conservation status
- Priority Two — Poorly Known Taxa (DEC)

Scientific classification
- Kingdom: Plantae
- Clade: Tracheophytes
- Clade: Angiosperms
- Clade: Monocots
- Order: Asparagales
- Family: Asparagaceae
- Subfamily: Lomandroideae
- Genus: Thysanotus
- Species: T. kalbarriensis

Binomial name
- Thysanotus kalbarriensis T.D.Macfarl., C.J.French & Conran &

= Thysanotus kalbarriensis =

Species of plant

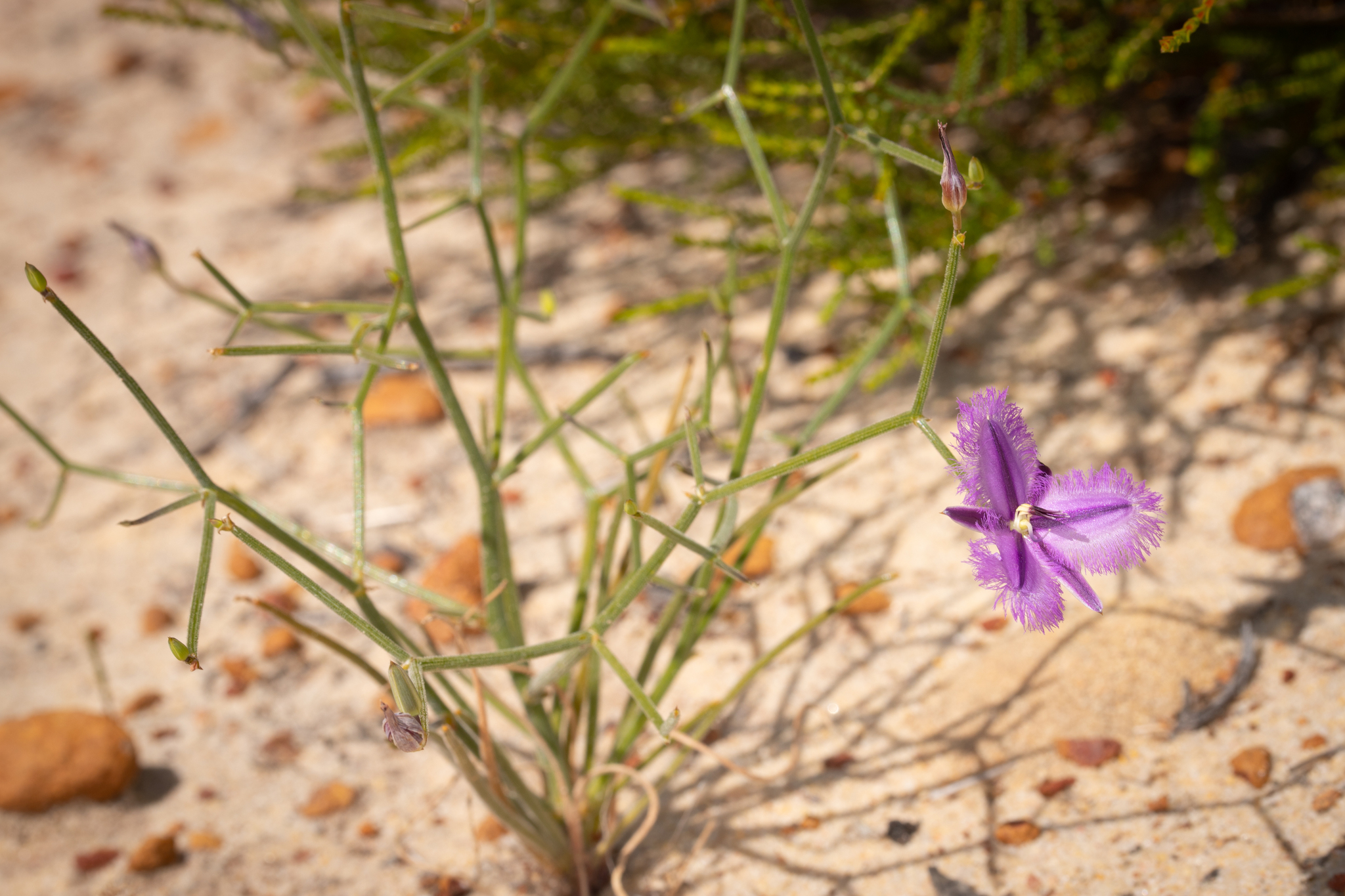
Habit

Thysanotus kalbarriensis, commonly known as Kalbarri fringe lily, is a species of flowering plant in the Asparagaceae family, and is endemic to Kalbarri National Park the north-west of Western Australia. It is a short-lived perennial with six to nine insignificant leaves or sometimes absent, purple flowers with clustered stamens, and a style strongly bent to one side and well-separated from the stamen cluster.

== Description ==
Thysanotus kalbarriensis is a short-lived, self-supporting perennial with a compact rootstock and fibrous roots. It has six to nine insignificant leaves 14–53 mm (0.55–2.09 in) long and 0.8–1.6 mm (0.031–0.063 in) wide, sometimes with no leaves. In the first season, the stem are much-branched and form a dense, interlocking tangle 10–25 cm (3.9–9.8 in) high. Later stems are several to many, erect to ascending, 30–55 cm (12–22 in) long, with up to three flowers in umbels, each flower on a pedicel 3–5.5 mm (0.12–0.22 in) long. The perianth is 9.5–12 mm (0.37–0.47 in) long with broadly linear, dark purple on the upper surface with pale edges, the petals purple with a darker purple central stripe. There are six stamens in a tight cluster, the anthers of two different lengths. The ovary is more or less cylindrical, and the style is strongly beneficial to one side, well separated from the stamen cluster. Flowering has been recorded from August to early November.

== Taxonomy ==
Thysanotus kalbarriensis was first formally described in 2020 by Terry Desmond Macfarlane, Christopher J. French and John Godfrey Conran in the journal Nuytsia from specimens collected by Macfarlane and French in Kalbarri National Park in 2015. The specific epithet (kalbarriensis) refers to the occurrence of the species near the town of Kalbarri.

== Distribution and habitat ==
This species of Thysanotus grows in sand in shrublands that are often dominated by species of Banksia and Grevillea, and the species is only known from Kalbarri National Park in the Geraldton Sandplains bioregion of north-western Western Australia.

== Conservation status ==
Thysanotus kalbarriensis is listed as "Priority Two" by the Government of Western Australia Department of Biodiversity, Conservation and Attractions, meaning that it is poorly known and from one or a few locations.
