= Thysanotus pseudojunceus =

Scientific classification
- Kingdom: Plantae
- Clade: Tracheophytes
- Clade: Angiosperms
- Clade: Monocots
- Order: Asparagales
- Family: Asparagaceae
- Subfamily: Lomandroideae
- Genus: Thysanotus
- Species: T. pseudojunceus

Binomial name
- Thysanotus pseudojunceus N.H.Brittan

Species of plant

Thysanotus pseudojunceus is a species of flowering plant in the Asparagaceae family, and is endemic to the south-west of Western Australia. It is usually a leafless perennial herb with a short rhizome, fibrous roots and umbels of two to five purple flowers with lance-shaped sepals, elliptic, fringed petals and six stamens of differing lengths.

== Description ==
Thysanotus pseudojunceus is a perennial herb with a short rhizome, fibrous roots and usually no leaves, but occasionally four or five terete leaves 35–50 mm (1.4–2.0 in) long. The stems are low-lying and branched, 300–360 mm (12–14 in) long. The flowers are borne in umbels of two to five, each flower on a pedicel 8–9 mm (0.31–0.35 in) long. The flowers are purple, the perianth segments 10–12 mm (0.39–0.47 in) long. The sepals are lance-shaped, about 3 mm (0.12 in) wide and the petals are elliptic, about 5 mm (0.20 in) wide with a fringe 2.5–4 mm (0.098–0.157 in) long. There are six stamens with twisted anthers, the outer anthers 3 mm (0.12 in) long, the inner ones 6 mm (0.24 in) long and curved. The style is curved, about 7 mm (0.28 in) long. Flowering occurs from November to December or January, and the seeds are elliptic, about 2 mm (0.079 in) long and 1.0–1.5 mm (0.039–0.059 in) in diameter with a stalked, dull orange aril.

== Taxonomy ==
Thysanotus pseudojunceus was first formally described in 1960 by Norman Henry Brittan in the Journal of the Royal Society of Western Australia from specimens he collected 15 mi (24 km) south of Kulin in 1954. The meaning of the specific epithet (pseudojunceus) means 'like a reed', (although not mentioned by the author, probably refers to a similarity to Thysanotus juncifolius).

== Distribution and habitat ==
This species of Thysanotus grows in clayey or peaty sand, loam or on granite, often in winter-wet places, in jarrah (Eucalyptus marginata) forest, between Albany and the mouth of the Blackwood River in the Esperance Plains, Jarrah Forest, Swan Coastal Plain and Warren bioregions of south-western Western Australia.

== Conservation status ==
Thysanotus pseudojunceus is listed as "not threatened" by the Government of Western Australia Department of Biodiversity, Conservation and Attractions.
