= Thysanotus ellipsoideus =

Scientific classification
- Kingdom: Plantae
- Clade: Tracheophytes
- Clade: Angiosperms
- Clade: Monocots
- Order: Asparagales
- Family: Asparagaceae
- Subfamily: Lomandroideae
- Genus: Thysanotus
- Species: T. ellipsoideus

Binomial name
- Thysanotus ellipsoideus T.D.Macfarl. & C.J.French

Species of plant

Thysanotus ellipsoideus is a species of flowering plant in the family Asparagaceae, and is endemic to the south coast of Western Australia. It is a perennial herb with an elliptic or spindle-shaped tuber, up to four leaves with sheathing bases, up to four purple flowers with fringed petals, six stamens and a pale green or yellowish ovary.

== Description ==
Thysanotus ellipsoideus is a perennial herb with a small rootstock, 5 to 18 elliptic to spindle-shaped tubers 11–30 mm (0.43–1.18 in) long and 3–11 mm (0.12–0.43 in) in diameter on long, thin, wiry roots. There are up to four narrowly sheathing leaves 80–250 mm (3.1–9.8 in) long. The flowers are borne in umbels of up to four flowers, each flowering at a different time, each on a pedicel 9.5–12.5 mm (0.37–0.49 in) long. The flowers are purple, with perianth segments 12–15.5 mm (0.47–0.61 in) long, the sepals 2.0–2.8 mm (0.079–0.110 in) wide, the petals elliptic about 3.8–7 mm (0.15–0.28 in) wide with a fringe up to 3–4.5 mm (0.12–0.18 in) long. There are six stamens, the ovary is pale green or yellowish with 9 to 11 ovules in each locule. Flowering has been recorded in December and January, and the fruit is cylindrical, enclosed in the withered perianth.

== Taxonomy ==
Thysanotus ellipsoideus was first formally described in 2024 by Terry Desmond Macfarlane and Christopher J. French in the journal Nuytsia from specimens they collected near the Kau Rock Nature Reserve in 2022. The specific epithet (ellipsoideus) refers to the 'ellipsoid shape of the tubers'.

== Distribution and habitat ==
This species grows in sand to sandy clay soils in low woodland and low heathland from the Lort River to Mount Ragged in the Esperance Plains and Mallee bioregions of southern Western Australia.

== Conservation status ==
Thysanotus ellipsoideus is listed as "not threatened" by the Government of Western Australia Department of Biodiversity, Conservation and Attractions.
