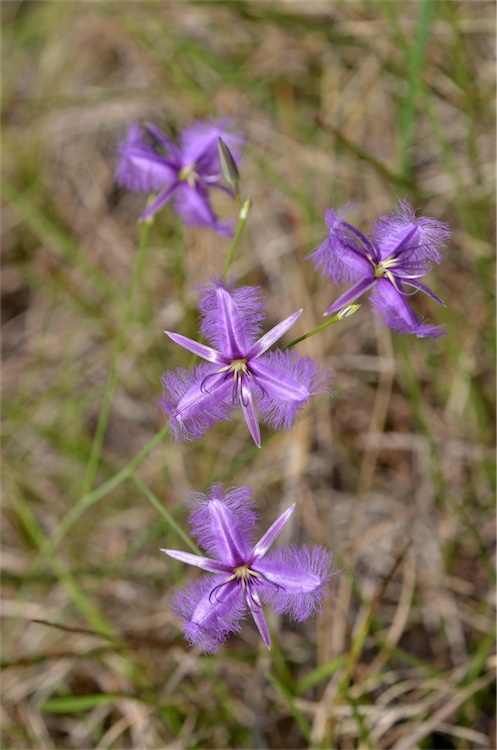

Scientific classification
- Kingdom: Plantae
- Clade: Tracheophytes
- Clade: Angiosperms
- Clade: Monocots
- Order: Asparagales
- Family: Asparagaceae
- Subfamily: Lomandroideae
- Genus: Thysanotus
- Species: T. banksii

Binomial name
- Thysanotus banksii R.Br.

Synonyms
- Chlamysporum banksii (R.Br.) Britten; Thysanotus paniculatus R.Br.; Thysanotus tuberosus auct. non R.Br.: Bentham, G. (March 1878); Thysanotus tuberosus auct. non R.Br.: Bailey, F.M. (1902); Thysanotus tuberosus auct. non R.Br.: Ewart, A.J. & Davies, O.B. (1917); Thysanotus tuberosus auct. non R.Br.: Gardner, C.A. (1930)

= Thysanotus banksii =

Species of plant

Thysanotus banksii is a species of flowering plant in the Asparagaceae family, and is native to Australia and New Guinea. It is a perennial herb with a small rootstock, linear leaves, and umbels of purple flowers with elliptic, fringed petals, lance-shaped sepals and six stamens.

== Description ==
Thysanotus banksii is a clumping perennial herb with a small rootstock, fibrous roots and 3 to 5 channelled annual leaves 20–60 cm (7.9–23.6 in) long and about 1 mm (0.039 in) wide. The flowers are borne in umbels of one or two flowers on a pedicel 5–10 mm (0.20–0.39 in) long. The flowers are purple, with perianth segments 7–18 mm (0.28–0.71 in) long, the sepals lance-shaped, about 2 mm (0.079 in) wide, the petals elliptic, about 5 mm (0.20 in) wide with a fringe about 1 mm (0.039 in) long. There are six stamens and the style is about 5 mm (0.20 in) long. The seed is more or less spherical, about 1.5–2.0 mm (0.059–0.079 in) long in diameter with a straw-coloured aril.

== Taxonomy ==
Thysanotus banksii was first formally described in 1810 by Robert Brown in his Prodromus Florae Novae Hollandiae. The specific epithet (banksii) honours Joseph Banks.

== Distribution and habitat ==
This species of Thysanotus grows in forest and moist tea-tree flats and on pebbly ridges from near Rockingham Bay to Cape York, the Gulf of Carpentaria in Queensland, and islands in the Torres Strait. It also occurs in southern New Guinea.

== Conservation status ==
Thysanotus banksii is listed as of "least concern" under the Queensland Government Nature Conservation Act 1992.
