= Thysanotus argillaceus =

Conservation status
- Priority One — Poorly Known Taxa (DEC)

Scientific classification
- Kingdom: Plantae
- Clade: Tracheophytes
- Clade: Angiosperms
- Clade: Monocots
- Order: Asparagales
- Family: Asparagaceae
- Subfamily: Lomandroideae
- Genus: Thysanotus
- Species: T. argillaceus

Binomial name
- Thysanotus argillaceus T.D.Macfarl. & C.J.French

Species of plant

Thysanotus argillaceus is a species of flowering plant in the family Asparagaceae, and is endemic to inland Western Australia. It is a perennial herb with several leaves withered at flowering time, one or two purple flowers with fringed petals, six stamens and a whitish ovary.

== Description ==
Thysanotus argillaceus is a perennial herb with up to 17 tubers about 24–48 mm (0.94–1.89 in) long and 5–11 mm (0.20–0.43 in) in diameter on long, thin, wiry roots. There are several narrowly sheathing leaves at the base of the plant but are withered by flowering time. The flowers are borne in umbels of three to five flowers, each on a pedicel 7.5–9 mm (0.30–0.35 in) long. The flowers are purple, with perianth segments 13–17.5 mm (0.51–0.69 in) long, the sepals 2.1–3 mm (0.083–0.118 in) long, the petals elliptic about 4–5.5 mm (0.16–0.22 in) wide with a fringe about 2.5–4 mm (0.098–0.157 in) long. There are six stamens, the ovary is whitish with 6 to 9 ovules in each locule. Flowering occurs in spring, and the fruit is spherical.

== Taxonomy ==
Thysanotus argillaceus was first formally described in 2024 by Terry Desmond Macfarlane and Christopher J. French in the journal Nuytsia from specimens they collected at the former pastoral lease Ennuin, north-north-west of Bullfinch in 2021. The specific epithet (argillaceus) means 'resembling white clay', referring to the soil type on which this species grows.

== Distribution and habitat ==
This species grows in red or orange clay soils on flats or lower slopes of slight rises in open woodland lacking any understorey and is only known from Ennuin and near the former Jaurdi Station homestead north of Boorabbin in the Coolgardie bioregion of inland Western Australia.

== Conservation status ==
Thysanotus argillaceus is listed as "Priority One" by the Government of Western Australia Department of Biodiversity, Conservation and Attractions, meaning that it is known from only one or a few locations where it is potentially at risk.
