= Thysanotus scaber =

Scientific classification
- Kingdom: Plantae
- Clade: Embryophytes
- Clade: Tracheophytes
- Clade: Spermatophytes
- Clade: Angiosperms
- Clade: Monocots
- Order: Asparagales
- Family: Asparagaceae
- Subfamily: Lomandroideae
- Genus: Thysanotus
- Species: T. scaber

Binomial name
- Thysanotus scaber Endl.

Species of flowering plant

Thysanotus scaber is a species of flowering plant in the Asparagaceae family, and is endemic to the south-west of Western Australia. It is a perennial herb with a small rootstock, cylindrical tubers, about four to six channnelled leaves and umbels of four to eight purple flowers with linear sepals, elliptic, fringed petals and six stamens.

== Description ==
Thysanotus scaber is a perennial herb with a small rootstock surrounded by old leaf bases. Its roots are tuberous, the tubers cylindrical about 40–50 mm (1.6–2.0 in) long. About four to six leaves are produced annually, channelled and ridged, 200–300 mm (7.9–11.8 in) long and rough with short teeth. The flowers are borne in panicles 350–400 mm (14–16 in) long with four to eight umbels, each flower on a pedical 10–12 mm (0.39–0.47 in) long. The perianth segments are 7.5–11 mm (0.30–0.43 in) long, the sepals linear, about 3 mm (0.12 in) wide and the petals are purple, about 8 mm (0.31 in) wide with a fringe about 3 mm (0.12 in) wide. There are six stamens, the anthers are about 3–4 mm (0.12–0.16 in) long and the style about 4.5 mm (0.18 in) long. Flowering occurs in October and November, and the fruit is more or less spherical, 1.0–1.5 mm (0.039–0.059 in) in diameter with a pale, straw-coloured aril.

== Taxonomy ==
Thysanotus scaber was first formally described in 1846 by Stephan Endlicher in Lehmann's Plantae Preissianae from specimens collected near the Swan River.

== Distribution and habitat ==
This species of Thysanotus grows in jarrah-marri (Eucalyptus marginata - E. calophylla) forest or in marri-wandoo (E. calophylla - E. wandoo) forest, on the Darling Range from near Perth, east to York then to about 120 km (75 mi) south-south-east of Perth, in the Avon Wheatbelt, Jarrah Forest and Swan Coastal Plain bioregions of south-western Western Australia.

== Conservation status ==
Thysanotus scaber is listed as "not threatened" by the Western Australian Government Department of Biodiversity, Conservation and Attractions.
