= Thysanotus isantherus =

Scientific classification
- Kingdom: Plantae
- Clade: Tracheophytes
- Clade: Angiosperms
- Clade: Monocots
- Order: Asparagales
- Family: Asparagaceae
- Subfamily: Lomandroideae
- Genus: Thysanotus
- Species: T. isantherus

Binomial name
- Thysanotus isantherus R.Br.

Species of plant

Thysanotus isantherus is a species of flowering plant in the Asparagaceae family, and is endemic to the south-west of Western Australia. It is a tufted, slender perennial herb, with a threadlike leaves, and umbels of one or two purple flowers with lance shaped sepals, elliptic, fringed petals and six stamens.

== Description ==
Thysanotus isantherus is a tufted, slender, perennial herb with elliptical tubers about 8 mm (0.31 in) long 4 mm (0.16 in) wide 10–15 mm (0.39–0.59 in) from the small rootstock. About six threadlike leaves 100–150 mm (3.9–5.9 in) long are produced each year. One or two flowers are borne in up to five umbels on pedicels 8–10 mm (0.31–0.39 in) long. The flowers are purple, the perianth segments about 7 mm (0.28 in) long. The sepals are lance-shaped, about 2 mm (0.079 in) wide and the petals are broadly elliptic, about 5 mm (0.20 in) wide with a fringe 1.0–1.5 mm (0.039–0.059 in) long. There are six stamens, the anthers 2.5–3 mm (0.098–0.118 in) long and the style is about 3 mm (0.12 in) long. Flowering occurs in November and December and the seeds are spherical, about 1.5 mm (0.059 in) in diameter with a pale straw-coloured aril.

== Taxonomy ==
Thysanotus isantherus was first formally described in 1810 by Robert Brown in his Prodromus Florae Novae Hollandiae. The specific epithet (isantherus) means 'equal anthers'.

== Distribution and habitat ==
This species of Thysanotus grows in moss swards on granite hills in the Jarrah Forest and Warren bioregions of south-western Western Australia.

== Conservation status ==
Thysanotus isantherus is listed as "Priority Four" by the Government of Western Australia Department of Biodiversity, Conservation and Attractions, meaning that is rare or near threatened.
