= Thysanotus nudicaulis =

Scientific classification
- Kingdom: Plantae
- Clade: Tracheophytes
- Clade: Angiosperms
- Clade: Monocots
- Order: Asparagales
- Family: Asparagaceae
- Subfamily: Lomandroideae
- Genus: Thysanotus
- Species: T. nudicaulis

Binomial name
- Thysanotus nudicaulis N.H.Brittan

Species of plant

Thysanotus nudicaulis is a species of flowering plant in the Asparagaceae family, and is native to Western Australia and South Australia. It is a perennial herb with tuberous roots, one or two terete to slightly angled leaves, a single umbel of up to four purple flowers with narrowly linear sepals, elliptic, fringed petals, six stamens and a curved style.

== Description ==
Thysanotus nudicaulis is a perennial herb with a small rhizome and tuberous roots, the tubers 20–60 mm (0.79–2.36 in) long and 5–6 mm (0.20–0.24 in) wide and 30–80 mm (1.2–3.1 in) from the stock. Its one or two leaves are terete to slightly angled, about 120–300 mm (4.7–11.8 in) long but that wither before flowering. The flowers are borne in a single umbel of up to four on a flowering stem 120–500 mm (4.7–19.7 in) long, each flower on a pedicel 7–10 mm (0.28–0.39 in) long. The flowers are purple, the perianth segments 13–17 mm (0.51–0.67 in) long. The sepals are narrowly linear, about 1.5–3 mm (0.059–0.118 in) wide and the petals are elliptic, 4.5–6 mm (0.18–0.24 in) wide with a fringe about 2–4 mm (0.079–0.157 in) wide. There are six stamens, the anthers twisted, the outer ones about 3–4 mm (0.12–0.16 in) long and the inner anthers about 7.5–10 mm (0.30–0.39 in) long and curved. The style is curved, 7.5–10 mm (0.30–0.39 in) long. Flowering occurs in November and December.

== Taxonomy ==
Thysanotus nudicaulis was first formally described in 1971 by Norman Henry Brittan in the Journal of the Royal Society of Western Australia from specimens he collected 65 mi (105 km) east of Esperance on the Israelite Bay track in 1960. The specific epithet (nudicaulis) means 'naked stalk'.

== Distribution and habitat ==
This species of Thysanotus grows in sandy heath with mallee eucalypts along the Great Australian Bight, from east of Ravensthorpe to Mount Ragged in the Cape Arid National Park in Western Australia, and at the southern tip of the Eyre Peninsula of South Australia.

== Conservation status ==
Thysanotus nudicaulis is listed as "not threatened" by the Government of Western Australia Department of Biodiversity, Conservation and Attractions, but as "endangered" in South Australia.
