= Thysanotus gracilis =

Scientific classification
- Kingdom: Plantae
- Clade: Tracheophytes
- Clade: Angiosperms
- Clade: Monocots
- Order: Asparagales
- Family: Asparagaceae
- Subfamily: Lomandroideae
- Genus: Thysanotus
- Species: T. gracilis

Binomial name
- Thysanotus gracilis R.Br.

Species of plant

Thysanotus gracilis is a species of flowering plant in the Asparagaceae family, and is endemic to the south-west of Western Australia. It is a tufted, slender perennial herb, with a few narrowly lance-shaped leaves, and umbels of one or two purple flowers with linear to oblong sepals, elliptic, fringed petals and six stamens.

== Description ==
Thysanotus gracilis is a tufted, slender, perennial herb with a rhizome about 10–20 mm (0.39–0.79 in) in diameter and fibrous roots. It has only a few narrowly lance-shaped leaves, 50–90 mm (2.0–3.5 in) long, and produced annually, and branched stems up to 40 cm (16 in) long. The flowers are borne in one or two umbels on pedicels about 7 mm (0.28 in) long. The flowers are purple, the perianth segments 10 mm (0.39 in) long. The sepals are linear to oblong, about 2.5 mm (0.098 in) wide and the petals are elliptic, about 5 mm (0.20 in) wide with a fringe 2.5 mm (0.098 in) long. There are six stamens, the anthers 5–6 mm (0.20–0.24 in) long and the style is about 5 mm (0.20 in) long. Flowering occurs from November to December or from January to March and the seeds are elliptic, about 2 mm (0.079 in) long and 1.5 mm (0.059 in) wide with a pale yellow aril.

== Taxonomy ==
Thysanotus gracilis was first formally described in 1810 by Robert Brown in his Prodromus Florae Novae Hollandiae. The specific epithet (gracilis) means 'thin' or 'slender'.

== Distribution and habitat ==
This species of Thysanotus grows in open woodland, in lateritic to loamy soils, from about 160 km (99 mi) north of Perth to the Albany area in the Esperance Plains, Jarrah Forest, Swan Coastal Plain and Warren bioregions of Western Australia.

== Conservation status ==
Thysanotus gracilis is listed as "not threatened" by the Government of Western Australia Department of Biodiversity, Conservation and Attractions.
