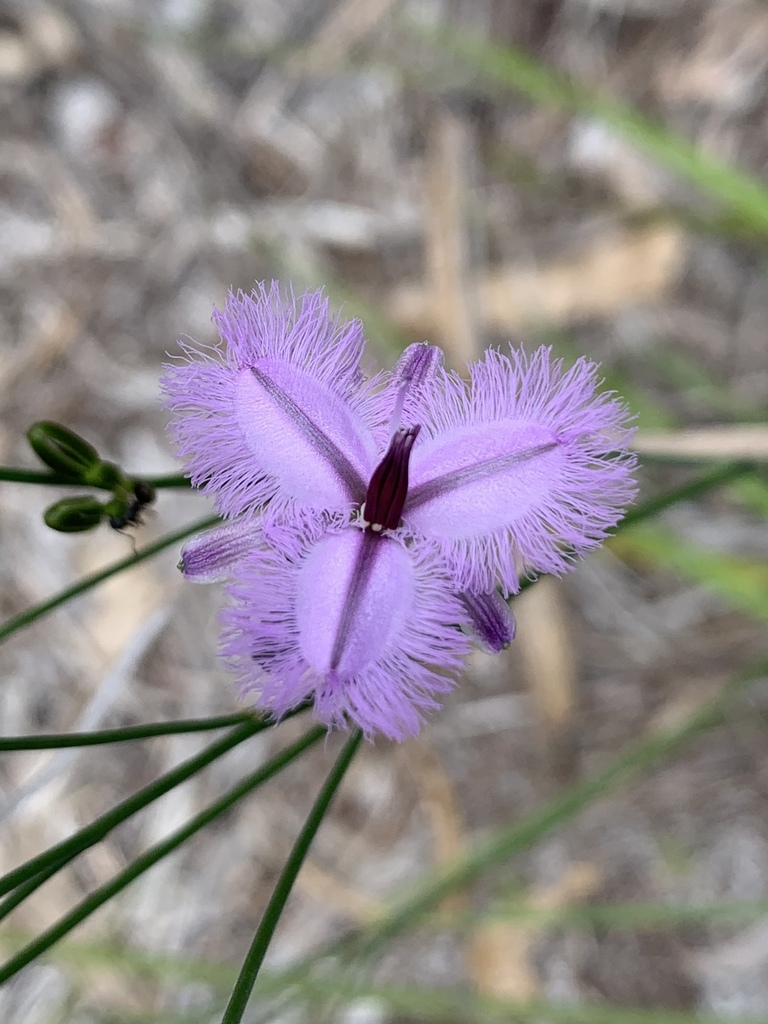
- Near Murdoch University

Scientific classification
- Kingdom: Plantae
- Clade: Tracheophytes
- Clade: Angiosperms
- Clade: Monocots
- Order: Asparagales
- Family: Asparagaceae
- Subfamily: Lomandroideae
- Genus: Thysanotus
- Species: T. arbuscula

Binomial name
- Thysanotus arbuscula Baker

Synonyms
- Chlamysporum arbusculum (Baker) Kuntze

= Thysanotus arbuscula =

Species of plant

Thysanotus arbuscula is a species of flowering plant in the Asparagaceae family, and is endemic to an area near Perth in the south-west of Western Australia. It is a perennial herb with a cylindrical rhizome, few linear leaves, leafless stems, and umbels of purple flowers with elliptic, fringed petals, linear sepals, six stamens and a slightly curved style.

== Description ==
Thysanotus arbuscula is a perennial herb with a cylindrical rhizome about 10 mm (0.39 in) in diameter. The leaves are few and produced occasionally, linear and about 60 mm (2.4 in) long. The stems are leafless, 28–93 cm (11–37 in) long and perennial, several per rhizome, branched close to the ground in young stems and about two-thirds of the length in mature stems. The flowers are borne in umbels of four to six flowers, each on a pedicel 3–4 mm (0.12–0.16 in) long. The flowers are purple, with perianth segments about 10 mm (0.39 in) long, the sepals, about 2 mm (0.079 in) wide, the petals elliptic 5–6 mm (0.20–0.24 in) long with a fringe 2.5–4.0 mm (0.098–0.157 in) long. There are six stamens, the style is slightly curved, about 8 mm (0.31 in) long. Flowering occurs from September to December or January.

== Taxonomy ==
Thysanotus arbuscula was first formally described in 1876 by John Gilbert Baker in the Journal of the Linnean Society, Botany from specimens collected by James Drummond near the Swan River. The specific epithet (arbuscula) means 'a small tree or shrub', referring to the habit of the species.

== Distribution and habitat ==
This species grows in sand, gravel or laterite in near-coastal areas from 160 km (99 mi) north and 260 km (160 mi) south-east of Perth in the Avon Wheatbelt, Geraldton Sandplains, Jarrah Forest and Swan Coastal Plain bioregions of south-western Western Australia.

== Conservation status ==
Thysanotus arbuscula is listed as "not threatened" by the Government of Western Australia Department of Biodiversity, Conservation and Attractions.
