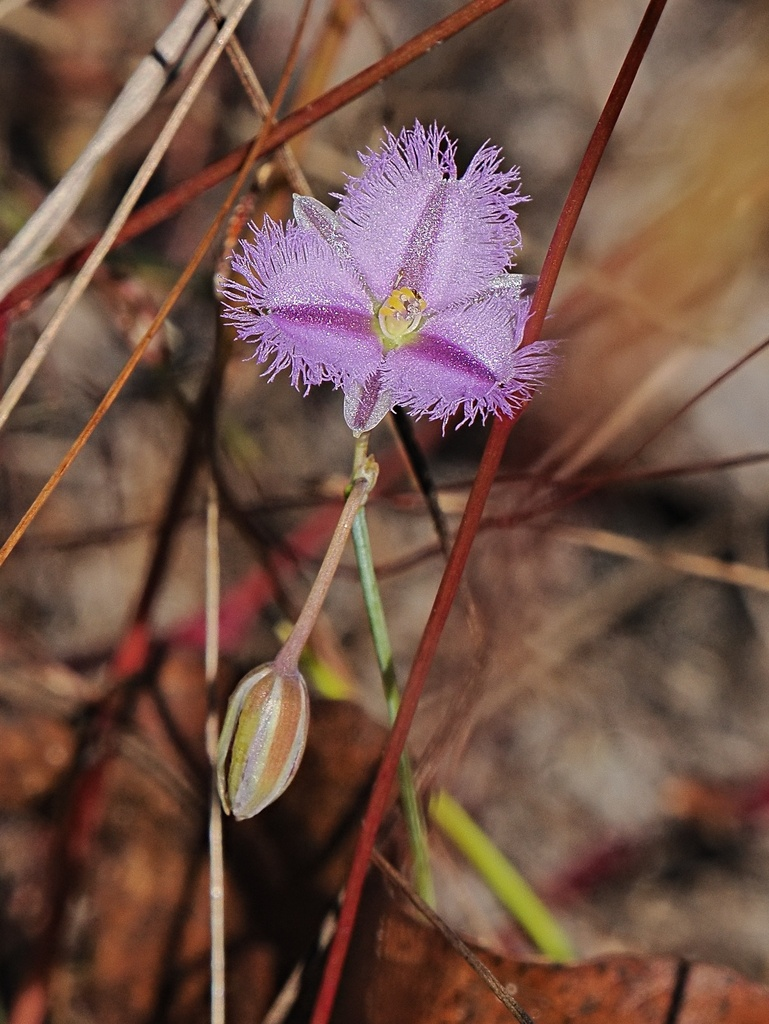
- In Drysdale River National Park

Scientific classification
- Kingdom: Plantae
- Clade: Embryophytes
- Clade: Tracheophytes
- Clade: Spermatophytes
- Clade: Angiosperms
- Clade: Monocots
- Order: Asparagales
- Family: Asparagaceae
- Subfamily: Lomandroideae
- Genus: Thysanotus
- Species: T. chinensis

Binomial name
- Thysanotus chinensis Benth.

Synonyms
- Chlamysporum chrysanthereum (F.Muell.) Kuntze; Chlamysporum chrysantherum Kuntze orth. var.; Thysanotus chryantherus F.Muell. orth. var.; Thysanotus chrysanthereus F.Muell.; Thysanotus chrysantherus Benth. nom. inval., nom. nud.; Thysanotus chrysantherus F.M.Bailey orth. var.

= Thysanotus chinensis =

Species of plant

Thysanotus chinensis is a species of flowering plant in the Asparagaceae family, and is native to parts of China, Southeast Asia, New Guinea, and some Australian states. It is a tufted, rhizomatous, perennial herb, with narrow, flat leaves, umbels of 20 to 50 purple flowers with linear sepals, elliptic, fringed petals, six stamens and a straight style.

== Description ==
Thysanotus chinensis is a tufted perennial herb with a small rootstock and fibrous roots. It has 3 to 20, apparently annual, linear, flat to channelled leaves 50–400 mm (2.0–15.7 in) long and up to 1 mm (0.039 in) wide. The flowers are borne in umbels of 3 to 15 flowers on a spreading to low-lying scape 70–470 mm (2.8–18.5 in) long, each flower on a pedicel 10–25 mm (0.39–0.98 in) long. The flowers are purple, the perianth segments 5.5–10 mm (0.22–0.39 in) long. The sepals are linear to narrowly lance-shaped, about 2 mm (0.079 in) wide and the petals are egg-shaped to elliptic, about 6 mm (0.24 in) wide with a fringe about 2 mm (0.079 in) long. There are six stamens, the anthers of two different lengths, and the style is 2.8–4 mm (0.11–0.16 in) long.

== Taxonomy ==
Thysanotus chinensis was first formally described in 1861 by George Bentham in Flora Hongkongensis from specimens collected by Rudolph Krone in southern China. The specific epithet (chinensis) means 'from China'.

== Distribution and habitat ==
This species grows in open, grassy situations in forest, grassland, on the edges of depressions and along rivers, in a variety of soil types, in tropical northern regions of Western Australia, the Northern Territory and Queensland in Australia. It also occurs in New Guinea, southern China, Hong Kong, northern Vietnam, southern Thailand, northern Malay Peninsula, Luzon in the Philippines, and on Sulawesi, Flores and Aru Islands in Indonesia.

== Conservation status ==
Thysanotus chinensis is listed as "not threatened" by the Government of Western Australia Department of Biodiversity, Conservation and Attractions, and as of "least concern" under the Northern Territory Government Territory Parks and Wildlife Conservation Act and the Queensland Government Nature Conservation Act 1992.
