= Thysanotus lavanduliflorus =

Conservation status
- Priority Three — Poorly Known Taxa (DEC)

Scientific classification
- Kingdom: Plantae
- Clade: Tracheophytes
- Clade: Angiosperms
- Clade: Monocots
- Order: Asparagales
- Family: Asparagaceae
- Subfamily: Lomandroideae
- Genus: Thysanotus
- Species: T. lavanduliflorus

Binomial name
- Thysanotus lavanduliflorus N.H.Brittan

Species of plant

Thysanotus lavanduliflorus is a species of flowering plant in the Asparagaceae family, and is endemic to the south-west of Western Australia. It is a tufted perennial herb with tuberous roots, two or three narrowly linear leaves, umbels of four or five purple flowers with narrowly lance-shaped sepals, oblong, fringed petals, six stamens and a curved style.

== Description ==
Thysanotus lavanduliflorus is a tufted perennial herb with a small rootstock and tuberous roots. Its two or three leaves are narrowly linear, about 60–70 mm (2.4–2.8 in) long but that wither before flowering. The flowers are borne in umbels of four or five, each flower on a pedicel 8–10 mm (0.31–0.39 in) long. The flowers are purple, the perianth segments 11–15 mm (0.43–0.59 in) long. The sepals are narrowly lance-shaped, about 2 mm (0.079 in) wide with a point on the end and the petals are oblong, 4.0–4.5 mm (0.16–0.18 in) wide with a fringe about 1.5 mm (0.059 in) long. There are six stamens, the outer anthers about 2.5–3 mm (0.098–0.118 in) long and the inner anthers about 6 mm (0.24 in) long, curved and twisted. The style is curved, 6–8 mm (0.24–0.31 in) long. Flowering occurs in November and December.

== Taxonomy ==
Thysanotus lavanduliflorus was first formally described in 1981 by Norman Henry Brittan in the journal Brunonia from specimens he collected on the Hyden-Newdegate road, 33.6 mi (54.1 km) south of Hyden in 1973. The specific epithet (lavanduliflorus) means 'lavender-flowered'.

== Distribution and habitat ==
This species of Thysanotus grows in open mallee and low woodland in sandy to loamy soils between Hyden and Newdegate in the south-west of Western Australia, in the Mallee bioregion.

== Conservation status ==
Thysanotus lavanduliflorus is listed as "Priority Three" by the Government of Western Australia Department of Biodiversity, Conservation and Attractions, meaning that it is poorly known and known from only a few locations but is not under imminent threat.
