= Thysanotus brachiatus =

Scientific classification
- Kingdom: Plantae
- Clade: Tracheophytes
- Clade: Angiosperms
- Clade: Monocots
- Order: Asparagales
- Family: Asparagaceae
- Subfamily: Lomandroideae
- Genus: Thysanotus
- Species: T. brachiatus

Binomial name
- Thysanotus brachiatus N.H.Brittan

Species of plant

Thysanotus brachiatus is a species of flowering plant in the Asparagaceae family, and is endemic to the south-west of Western Australia. It is a leafless, rhizomatous, perennial herb, with more or less annual stems, umbels of up to eight purple flowers with elliptic, fringed petals, very narrowly linear sepals, six stamens and a curved style.

== Description ==
Thysanotus brachiatus is a leafless perennial herb with more or less spherical rhizomes about 7–10 mm (0.28–0.39 in) in diameter and fibrous roots. The stems are produced annually, possibly persisting for a further year, up to 190–250 mm (7.5–9.8 in) long, ridged and widely branched. The stems are hairy in lower parts but glabrous above with two to four membranous, narrowly lance-shaped bracts 15–25 mm (0.59–0.98 in) long and about 2 mm (0.079 in) wide. The flowers are borne in umbels of up to eight flowers, each on a pedicel about 4 mm (0.16 in) long. The flowers are purple, with perianth segments 7–8 mm (0.28–0.31 in) long, the sepals very narrowly lance-shaped, about 1.5 mm (0.059 in) wide. The petals are elliptic about 3–4 mm (0.12–0.16 in) long with a fringe about 3 mm (0.12 in) long. There are six stamens, the anthers of different lengths, and the style is curved, about 4 mm (0.16 in) long. Flowering occurs from June to September.

== Taxonomy ==
Thysanotus brachiatus was first formally described in 1972 by Norman Henry Brittan in the Journal of the Royal Society of Western Australia from specimens he collected about 21 mi (34 km) south-south-west of Ravensthorpe in 1960. The specific epithet (brachiatus) means 'having branches with spreading arms'.

== Distribution and habitat ==
This species grows in sandplain vegetation in deep sandy soils in the Ravensthorpe area and south to Hopetoun in the Esperance Plains, Mallee and Swan Coastal Plain bioregions of south-western Western Australia.

== Conservation status ==
Thysanotus brachiatus is listed as "Priority Two" meaning that it is poorly known and known from only a few locations but is not under imminent threat.
