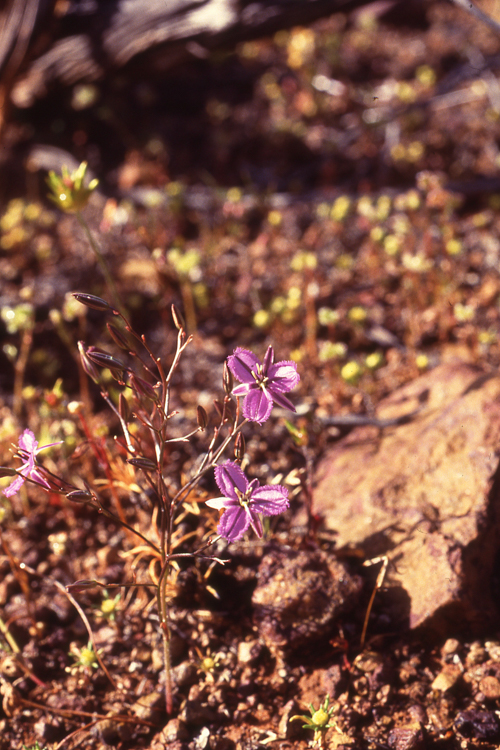
- South of Yalgoo

Scientific classification
- Kingdom: Plantae
- Clade: Tracheophytes
- Clade: Angiosperms
- Clade: Monocots
- Order: Asparagales
- Family: Asparagaceae
- Subfamily: Lomandroideae
- Genus: Thysanotus
- Species: T. ramulosus

Binomial name
- Thysanotus ramulosus N.H.Brittan

= Thysanotus ramulosus =

Species of plant

Thysanotus ramulosus is a species of flowering plant in the Asparagaceae family, and is endemic to the south-west of Western Australia. It is a leafless herb with a small rootstock, perennial stems, tuberous roots and flowers arranged singly, with linear to lance-shaped sepals, elliptic, fringed petals and six stamens of differing lengths.

== Description ==
Thysanotus ramulosus is a leafless herb with a small rootstock, perennial stems, tuberous roots, the tubers with a short stalk, about 20 mm (0.79 in) long and 4 mm (0.16 in) in diameter. The stems are perennial, about 100 mm (3.9 in) long, branched and glabrous or with scattered, flattened hairs. The upper branches are 60–80 mm (2.4–3.1 in) long with flowers arranged singly or in pairs on a pedicel 3 mm (0.12 in) long. The perianth segments are 10–11 mm (0.39–0.43 in) long, the sepals linear to narrowly lance-shaped, about 2 mm (0.079 in) wide and the petals elliptic, 5 mm (0.20 in) wide with a fringe 1.5–3 mm (0.059–0.118 in) long. There are six stamens, the anthers very slightly curved, the outer ones 3.5 mm (0.14 in) long, the inner three 4.5 mm (0.18 in) long. The style is about 5 mm (0.20 in) long. Flowering occurs in September, and the seeds are black, about 1.0 mm (0.039 in) long and 1.0 mm (0.039 in) in diameter with an aril.

== Taxonomy ==
Thysanotus ramulosus was first formally described in 1972 by Norman Henry Brittan in the Journal of the Royal Society of Western Australia from specimens he collected "just north of the crossing of Murchison River by North West Coastal Highway about 40 km (25 mi) north of Northampton" in 1968. The specific epithet (ramulosus) means 'bearing branchlets'.

== Distribution and habitat ==
This species of Thysanotus grows in sand over granite in red, stony loam in areas dominated by Acacia species, from the Murchison River to localities 290 km (180 mi) further east, in the Avon Wheatbelt, Geraldton Sandplains, Murchison and Yalgoo bioregions of south-western Western Australia.

== Conservation status ==
Thysanotus ramulosus is listed as "not threatened" by the Government of Western Australia Department of Biodiversity, Conservation and Attractions.
