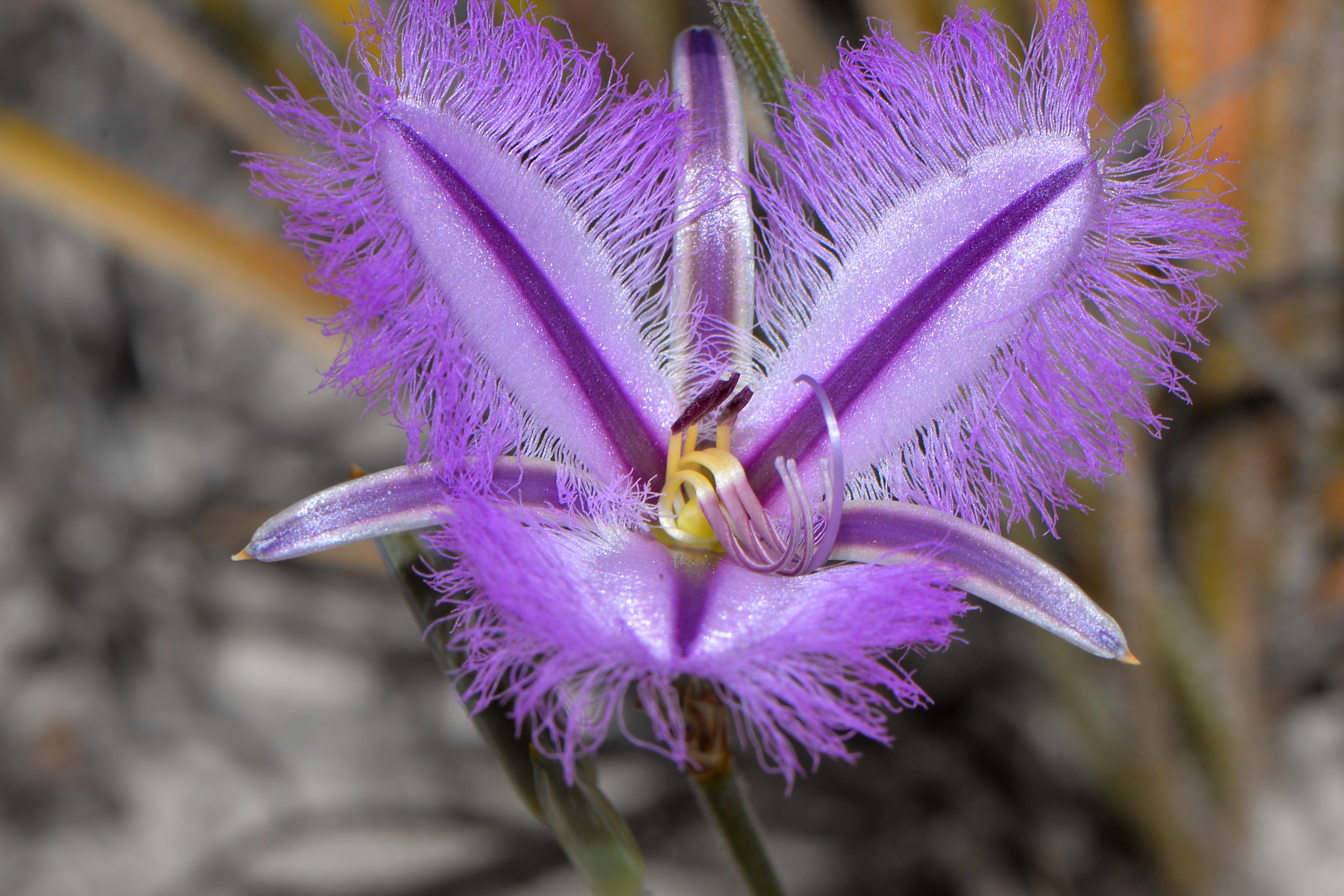

Scientific classification
- Kingdom: Plantae
- Clade: Tracheophytes
- Clade: Angiosperms
- Clade: Monocots
- Order: Asparagales
- Family: Asparagaceae
- Subfamily: Lomandroideae
- Genus: Thysanotus
- Species: T. asper

Binomial name
- Thysanotus asper Lindl.

Synonyms
- Chlamysporum asperum (Lindl.) Kuntze

= Thysanotus asper =

Species of plant

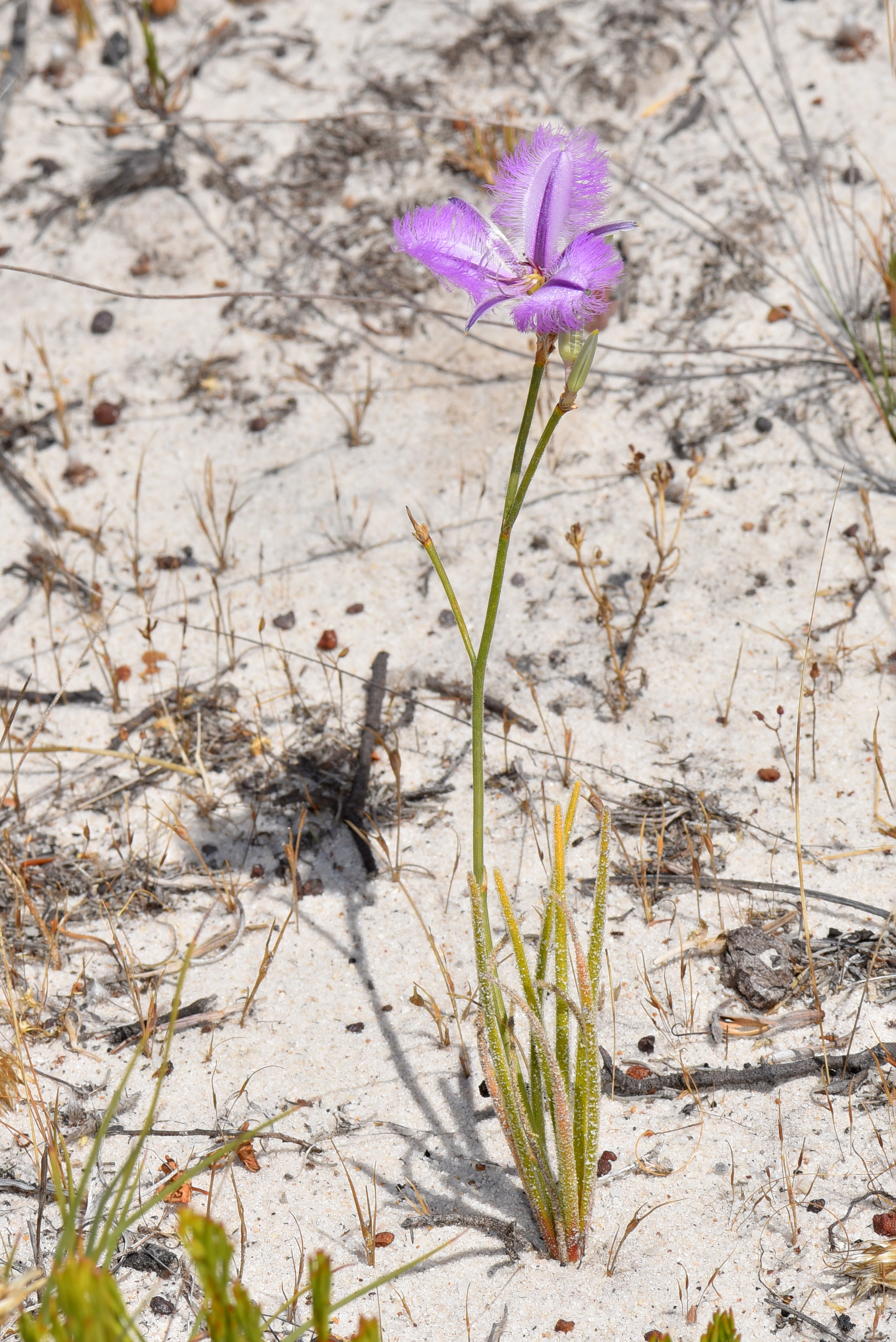
Habit and densely hairy leaves

Thysanotus asper, commonly known as hairy fringe lily, is a species of flowering plant in the Asparagaceae family, and is endemic to the south-west of Western Australia. It is a clumping perennial herb with a small rootstock, stiff linear leaves, and umbels of purple flowers with elliptic, fringed petals, linear sepals, six stamens and a curved style.

== Description ==
Thysanotus asper is a clumping perennial herb with a small rootstock and fibrous roots and 10 to 50 stiff, striated perennial leaves 100–210 mm (3.9–8.3 in) long about 1 mm (0.039 in) wide with hairs on the outer surface. The flowers are borne in umbels of four or five flowers on up to five flowering stems 30–41 cm (12–16 in) long, each flower on a pedicel about 20 mm (0.79 in) long. The flowers are purple, with perianth segments about 20 mm (0.79 in) long, the sepals linear, 2.0–2.5 mm (0.079–0.098 in) wide, the petals elliptic, 5–6 mm (0.20–0.24 in) wide with a fringe about 5 mm (0.20 in) long. There are six stamens and the style is curved, about 13 mm (0.51 in) long. Flowering occurs from October to December or January and the seed is more or less spherical, about 1.5–2.0 mm (0.059–0.079 in) long in diameter with an almost black aril.

== Taxonomy ==
Thysanotus asper was first formally described in 1840 by John Lindley in his A Sketch of the Vegetation of the Swan River Colony. The specific epithet (asper) means 'rough to the touch'.

== Distribution and habitat ==
This species of Thysanotus grows in yellow or calcareous sand in a wide range of habitats, including sandplain and jarrah (Eucalyptus marginata) - marri (E. calophylla) forest in the Geraldton Sandplains, Jarrah Forest and Swan Coastal Plain bioregions of south-western Western Australia.

== Conservation status ==
Thysanotus asper is listed as "not threatened" by the Government of Western Australia Department of Biodiversity, Conservation and Attractions.
