= Thysanotus cymosus =

Scientific classification
- Kingdom: Plantae
- Clade: Tracheophytes
- Clade: Angiosperms
- Clade: Monocots
- Order: Asparagales
- Family: Asparagaceae
- Subfamily: Lomandroideae
- Genus: Thysanotus
- Species: T. cymosus

Binomial name
- Thysanotus cymosus N.H.Brittan

Species of plant

Thysanotus cymosus is a species of flowering plant in the Asparagaceae family, and is endemic to the south-west of Western Australia. It is a tufted perennial herb, with linear leaves, umbels of 4 to 6 purple flowers with linear sepals, elliptic, fringed petals, six stamens and a straight style.

== Description ==
Thysanotus cymosus is a perennial herb with a small rootstock, fibrous roots and elliptical tubers 10–15 mm (0.39–0.59 in) long about 50–70 mm (2.0–2.8 in) from the stock. There are about 2 or 3 linear, annual leaves up to 200–300 mm (7.9–11.8 in) long surrounded by the sheaths of old leaves. The flowers are borne in umbels of 4 to 6 flowers on a scape 200–250 mm (7.9–9.8 in) long, each flower on a pedicel about 10 mm (0.39 in) long. The flowers are purple, the perianth segments 9–10 mm (0.35–0.39 in) long. The sepals are linear, 1.5 mm (0.059 in) long. There are six stamens, the anthers of different lengths, and the style is about 4 mm (0.16 in) long. Flowering occurs in September and October.

== Taxonomy ==
Thysanotus cymosus was first formally described in 1960 by Norman Henry Brittan in the Journal of the Royal Society of Western Australia from specimens he collected 30 mi (48 km) south of Kulin in 1958. The specific epithet (cymosus) means 'cymose'.

== Distribution and habitat ==
This species grows in granitic or lateritic soils on sandplains in the Avon Wheatbelt, Esperance Plains, Jarrah Forest, Mallee and Warren bioregions of south-western Western Australia.

== Conservation status ==
Thysanotus cymosus is listed as "Priority Three" by the Government of Western Australia, Department of Biodiversity, Conservation and Attractions, meaning that it is poorly known and known from only a few locations, but is not under imminent threat.
