= Thysanotus tenuis =

Conservation status
- Priority Three — Poorly Known Taxa (DEC)

Scientific classification
- Kingdom: Plantae
- Clade: Embryophytes
- Clade: Tracheophytes
- Clade: Spermatophytes
- Clade: Angiosperms
- Clade: Monocots
- Order: Asparagales
- Family: Asparagaceae
- Subfamily: Lomandroideae
- Genus: Thysanotus
- Species: T. tenuis

Binomial name
- Thysanotus tenuis Lindl.

Synonyms
- Chlamysporum tenue (Lindl.) Kuntze

Species of plant

Thysanotus tenuis is a species of flowering plant in the Asparagaceae family, and is endemic to the south-west of Western Australia. It is a clumping perennial herb with a tuberous roots, three or four terete annual leaves, and panicles of purple flowers with elliptic, fringed petals, linear to narrowly lance-shaped sepals, six stamens and a straight to curved style.

== Description ==
Thysanotus tenuis is a perennial herb with a small rootstock and tuberous roots, the tubers 30–40 mm (1.2–1.6 in) long and 4 mm (0.16 in) wide. There are three or four more or less terete annual leaves 150–180 mm (5.9–7.1 in) long and hairy on the lower edges. The flowers are borne in branched panicles about 200–240 mm (7.9–9.4 in) long, with umbels of one or two flowers each on a pedicel 6–7 mm (0.24–0.28 in) long. The flowers are purple, with perianth segments about 10 mm (0.39 in) long, the sepals linear to narrowly lance-shaped, 1.5 mm (0.059 in) wide, the petals elliptic, about 3.5 mm (0.14 in) wide with a fringe about 1.0–1.5 mm (0.039–0.059 in) long. There are six stamens of two different lengths and the style is straight to slightly curved, about 3.5–4 mm (0.14–0.16 in) long. Flowering occurs in September or October and the seed is more or less spherical, about 1 mm (0.039 in) long in diameter with an straw-coloured aril.

== Taxonomy ==
Thysanotus tenuis was first formally described in 1838 by John Lindley in Sydenham Edwards Botanical Register from specimens collected by Robert Mangles in 1837. The specific epithet (tenuis) means 'thin', 'narrow' or 'delicate'.

== Distribution and habitat ==
This species of Thysanotus grows in clayey or sandy loam soils in depressions in low woodland near Wagin and Wickepin in the Avon Wheatbelt and Mallee bioregions of south-western Western Australia.

== Conservation status ==
Thysanotus tenuis is listed as "Priority Three" by the Government of Western Australia Department of Biodiversity, Conservation and Attractions, meaning that it is poorly known and known from only a few locations but is not under imminent threat.
