= Thysanotus prospectus =

Scientific classification
- Kingdom: Plantae
- Clade: Embryophytes
- Clade: Tracheophytes
- Clade: Spermatophytes
- Clade: Angiosperms
- Clade: Monocots
- Order: Asparagales
- Family: Asparagaceae
- Subfamily: Lomandroideae
- Genus: Thysanotus
- Species: T. prospectus

Binomial name
- Thysanotus prospectus C.J.French & T.D.Macfarl.

Species of flowering plant

Thysanotus prospectus is a species of flowering plant in the Asparagaceae family, and is endemic to southern Western Australia. It is an annual herb with glabrous, terete leaves, and panicles of usually three or four purple flowers with elliptic, fringed petals and six stamens.

== Description ==
Thysanotus prospectus is an annual herb with a small, perennial rootstock and storage roots. Its three to eight leaves are terete, erect, glabrous, 199–390 mm (7.8–15.4 in) long and 0.8–2.2 mm (0.031–0.087 in) wide. The flowers are borne in a panicle usually with three or four flowers on an erect scape, the rachis 20–330 mm (0.79–12.99 in) long and slightly longer to much longer than the leaves. Each flower is on an erect pedicel 11–20 mm (0.43–0.79 in) long. The perianth segments are 13–18 mm (0.51–0.71 in) long, the sepals 2–3.9 mm (0.079–0.154 in) wide. The petals are purple, 3.5–7.6 mm (0.14–0.30 in) wide, with a fringe about 2–5 mm (0.079–0.197 in) long. There are six stamens, the outer anthers straight and twisted, 3.1–5.6 mm (0.12–0.22 in) long, and the inner anthers twisted and strongly curved, 6.5–8 mm (0.26–0.31 in) long. Flowering occurs in late November and December, and the fruit is cylindrical, 7.0–7.5 mm (0.28–0.30 in) long, the seeds black with a whitish aril.

== Taxonomy ==
Thysanotus prospectus was first formally described in 2024 by Christopher James French and Terry Desmond Macfarlane in the journal Nuytsia from specimens collected on the east side of Lake Pleasant View near Manypeaks township in 2021. The specific epithet (prospectus) means 'an outlook' or 'view', referring to the occurrence of the plant on sites overlooking lakes, particularly the lake where the authors first saw the species.

== Distribution and habitat ==
This species of fringe lily grows in damp to wet sites near the shores of lakes or in adjacent gypsum dunes between Manypeaks and near Cape Arid National Park in the Esperance Plains and Jarrah Forest bioregions of southern Western Australia.

== Conservation status ==
Thysanotus prospectus is listed as "not threatened" by the Government of Western Australia Department of Biodiversity, Conservation and Attractions.
