= Thysanotus anceps =

Conservation status
- Priority Three — Poorly Known Taxa (DEC)

Scientific classification
- Kingdom: Plantae
- Clade: Tracheophytes
- Clade: Angiosperms
- Clade: Monocots
- Order: Asparagales
- Family: Asparagaceae
- Subfamily: Lomandroideae
- Genus: Thysanotus
- Species: T. anceps

Binomial name
- Thysanotus anceps Lindl.

Synonyms
- Chlamysporum anceps (Lindl.) Kuntze

Species of plant

Thysanotus anceps is a species of flowering plant in the Asparagaceae family, and is endemic to the south-west of Western Australia. It is a leafless perennial herb with an irregularly shaped rhizome, branched stems, and umbels of purple flowers with elliptic, fringed petals, linear to lance-shaped sepals, six stamens and a curved style.

== Description ==
Thysanotus anceps is a leafless perennial herb with an irregularly shaped rhizome up to 50 mm (2.0 in) long and 30 mm (1.2 in) wide. Young plants have linear leaves 10–15 mm (0.39–0.59 in) long and about 30 mm (1.2 in) wide, but mature plants are leafless with three or four branching stems that are more or less square at the base. The flowers are borne in umbels of two or three flowers, each on a pedicel about 7 mm (0.28 in) long. The flowers are purple, with perianth segments 13–14 mm (0.51–0.55 in) long, the sepals linear to lance-shaped 1.5–2 mm (0.059–0.079 in) wide, the petals elliptic with a fringe about 4 mm (0.16 in) long. There are six stamens, the style is curved, about 8–9 mm (0.31–0.35 in) long. Flowering occurs from October to December and the seed is elliptical, about 2 mm (0.079 in) long and 1.5 mm (0.059 in) in diameter with an orange aril.

== Taxonomy ==
Thysanotus anceps was first formally described in 1840 by John Lindley in his A Sketch of the Vegetation of the Swan River Colony. The specific epithet (anceps) means 'two-headed', because the type has a double panicle.

== Distribution and habitat ==
This species grows in jarrah (Eucalyptus marginata) - marri (E. calophylla) forest in lateritic soil in the Darling Range, in the Geraldton Sandplains, Jarrah Forest and Swan Coastal Plain bioregions of south-western Western Australia.

== Conservation status ==
Thysanotus anceps is listed as "Priority Three" by the Government of Western Australia Department of Biodiversity, Conservation and Attractions, meaning that it is poorly known and known from only a few locations but is not under imminent threat.
