= Thysanotus brachyantherus =

Scientific classification
- Kingdom: Plantae
- Clade: Tracheophytes
- Clade: Angiosperms
- Clade: Monocots
- Order: Asparagales
- Family: Asparagaceae
- Subfamily: Lomandroideae
- Genus: Thysanotus
- Species: T. brachyantherus

Binomial name
- Thysanotus brachyantherus N.H.Brittan

Species of plant

Thysanotus brachyantherus is a species of flowering plant in the Asparagaceae family, and is endemic to the south of Western Australia. It is a tufted perennial herb, with more or less terete leaves, umbels of up to four purple flowers with linear sepals, elliptic, fringed petals, six stamens and a straight style.

== Description ==
Thysanotus brachyantherus is a tufted perennial herb with a small rootstock and elliptical tubers 15–30 mm (0.59–1.18 in) long and 50–70 mm (2.0–2.8 in) from the rootstock. There are four or five more or less terete leaves up to 150 mm (5.9 in) long but wither early. The flowers are borne in groups 90–260 mm (3.5–10.2 in) long in up to four umbels, each flower on a pedicel 5–7 mm (0.20–0.28 in) long. The flowers are purple, with perianth segments about 9 mm (0.35 in) long, the sepals linear, about 1.5 mm (0.059 in) wide. The petals are elliptic about 3.5 mm (0.14 in) wide with a fringe about 3 mm (0.12 in) long. There are six stamens, the anthers of different lengths, and the style is straight, about 3 mm (0.12 in) long. Flowering occurs from October to December.

== Taxonomy ==
Thysanotus brachyantherus was first formally described in 1972 by Norman Henry Brittan in the Journal of the Royal Society of Western Australia from specimens he collected on a sandplain, near the Russell Range, about 100 mi (160 km) east of Esperance, in 1960. The specific epithet (brachyantherus) means 'short anthered'.

== Distribution and habitat ==
This species grows in sandplain vegetation dominated by mallee eucalypts in the Coolgardie, Esperance Plains, Mallee and Murchison bioregions of southern Western Australia.

== Conservation status ==
Thysanotus brachyantherus is listed as "not threatened" by the Government of Western Australia Department of Biodiversity, Conservation and Attractions.
