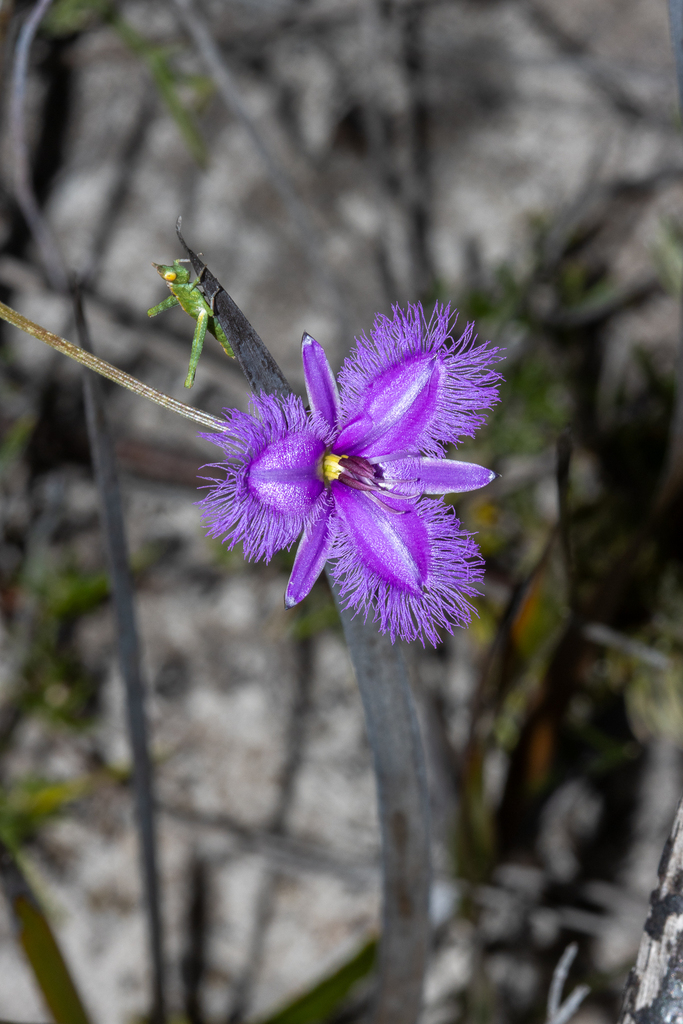
- On Kangaroo Island

Scientific classification
- Kingdom: Plantae
- Clade: Tracheophytes
- Clade: Angiosperms
- Clade: Monocots
- Order: Asparagales
- Family: Asparagaceae
- Subfamily: Lomandroideae
- Genus: Thysanotus
- Species: T. fractiflexus

Binomial name
- Thysanotus fractiflexus N.H.Brittan

= Thysanotus fractiflexus =

Species of plant

Thysanotus fractiflexus, commonly known as zig-zag fringe-lily is a species of flowering plant in the Asparagaceae family, and is endemic to Kangaroo Island in South Australia. It is a rhizomatous herb with usually perennial, zig-zagged stems, umbels with two or three purple flowers, with narrowly lance-shaped sepals, more or less circular, fringed petals, six stamens, a style as long as the longer anthers and a cylindrical capsule.

== Description ==
Thysanotus fractiflexus is a perennial herb with a rhizome about 8–10 mm (0.31–0.39 in) in diameter, fibrous roots but has leaves only present in young plants. The stems are perennial, zig-zagged, occasionally straight in older specimens, up to 300 mm (12 in) long and ridged with short, stiff hairs on the ridges. The flowers are purple and borne in two or three umbels, each flower on a pedicel about 7 mm (0.28 in) long. The perianth segments are 10–11 mm (0.39–0.43 in) long, the sepals narrowly lance-shaped, 2.0–2.5 mm (0.079–0.098 in) wide, the petals more or less circular in outline, 5 mm (0.20 in) in diameter with a fridge up to 3.5 mm (0.14 in) long. There are six stamens, the anthers twisted, the three outer anthers 4 mm (0.16 in) long and the three inner anthers 6 mm (0.24 in) long and curved. The style is about 6 mm (0.24 in) long and the seeds are subcylindrical, 1.5 mm (0.059 in) long and 1 mm (0.039 in) in diameter with a shortly stalked, orange aril.

== Taxonomy ==
Thysanotus fractiflexus was first formally described in 1971 by Norman Henry Brittan in the Transactions of the Royal Society of South Australia from specimens he collected on Kangaroo Island in 1960. The specific epithet (fractiflexus) means 'zig-zag'.

== Distribution and habitat ==
Zig-zag fringe-lily grows in open heath to woodland in lateritic gravel to sandy loam on Kangaroo Island.
