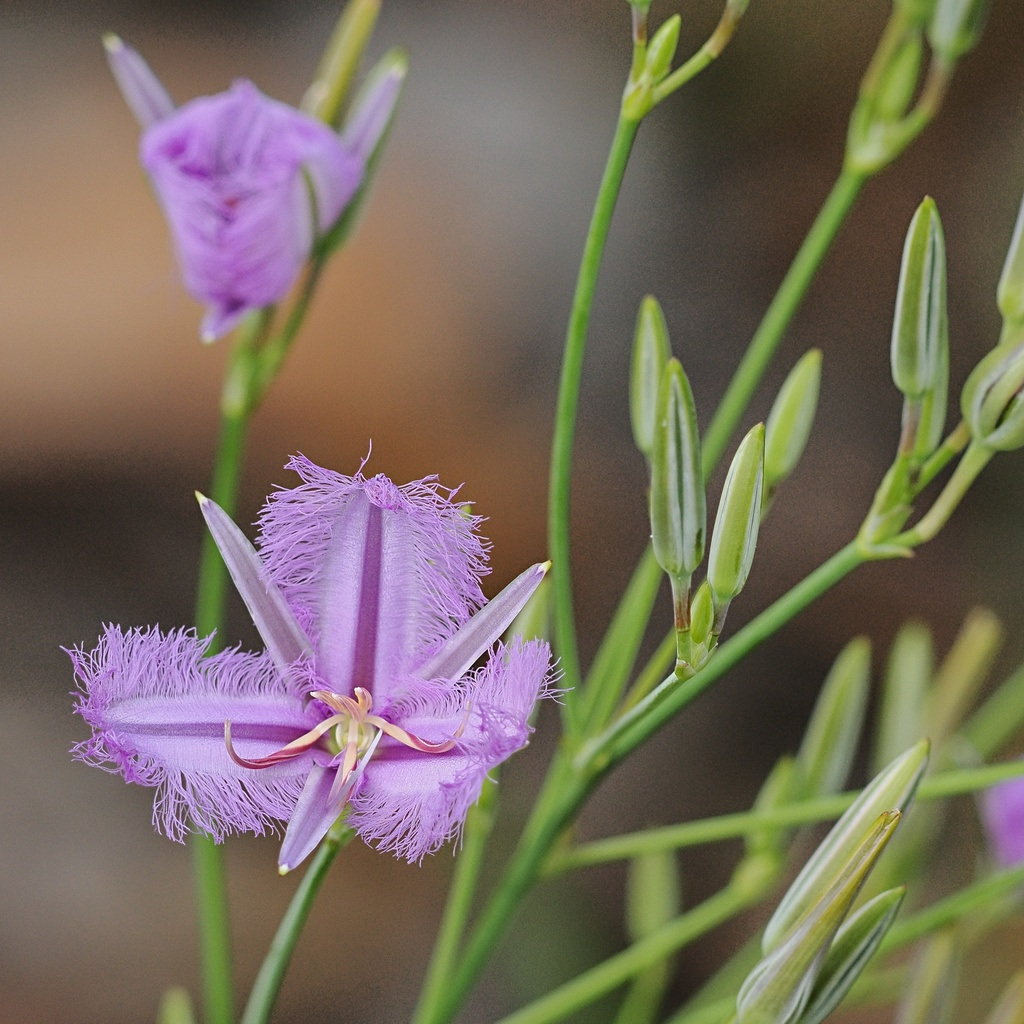

Conservation status
- Priority Three — Poorly Known Taxa (DEC)

Scientific classification
- Kingdom: Plantae
- Clade: Tracheophytes
- Clade: Angiosperms
- Clade: Monocots
- Order: Asparagales
- Family: Asparagaceae
- Subfamily: Lomandroideae
- Genus: Thysanotus
- Species: T. elatior

Binomial name
- Thysanotus elatior R.Br.

= Thysanotus elatior =

Species of plant

Thysanotus elatior is a species of flowering plant in the family Asparagaceae and is endemic to north-western Australia. It is a perennial herb with a small rootstock, leaves produced annually, and panicles of purple flowers with broadly egg-shaped to elliptic fringed petals, lance-shaped sepals and six stamens.

== Description ==
Thysanotus elatior is a perennial herb with cylindrical to elliptic tubers 30–50 mm (1.2–2.0 in) long and 5–8 mm (0.20–0.31 in) in diameter. Its 4 to 9 leaves are produced annually, 35–55 cm (14–22 in) long and 0.8–2.2 mm (0.031–0.087 in) wide with membranous edges. The flowering stems are 60–85 cm (24–33 in) long with one or two branches per node, 80–210 mm (3.1–8.3 in) long. The flowers are purple and borne in umbels of up to 5 to 9 on pedicels 12–25 mm (0.47–0.98 in) long, the perianth segments 20–25 mm (0.79–0.98 in) long. The sepals are lance-shaped, 2.4–2.8 mm (0.094–0.110 in) wide, the petals broadly egg-shaped to elliptic, 18–22 mm (0.71–0.87 in) wide with a fringe 5.5–6.5 mm (0.22–0.26 in) wide. There are six stamens, the anthers of different lengths, and the style bent to one side, 12–14 mm (0.47–0.55 in) long. Flowering mainly occurs from January to early May, and the seeds are more or less spherical, 2.0–2.5 mm (0.079–0.098 in) in diameter with a brown, cap-like aril.

== Taxonomy and naming ==
Thysanotus elatior was first formally described in 1810 by Robert Brown and the description was published in Prodromus Florae Novae Hollandiae et Insulae Van Diemen. The specific epithet (elatior) means 'taller'.

== Distribution and habitat ==
This species of Thysanotus mostly grows in grasslands on sandy soils, sometimes in woodland, and is restricted to the Kimberley region of northern Western Australia and the Top End of the Northern Territory.

== Conservation status ==
Thysanotus elatior is listed as "Priority Three" by the Government of Western Australia Department of Biodiversity, Conservation and Attractions, meaning that it is poorly known and known from only a few locations but is not under imminent threat, but as of "least concern" under the Northern Territory Government Territory Parks and Wildlife Conservation Act.
