= Thysanotus pauciflorus =

Scientific classification
- Kingdom: Plantae
- Clade: Tracheophytes
- Clade: Angiosperms
- Clade: Monocots
- Order: Asparagales
- Family: Asparagaceae
- Subfamily: Lomandroideae
- Genus: Thysanotus
- Species: T. pauciflorus

Binomial name
- Thysanotus pauciflorus R.Br.

Synonyms
- Chlamysporum pauciflorum Steud. nom. inval., pro syn.; Chlamysporum pauciflorum (R.Br.) Kuntze

Species of flowering plant

Thysanotus pauciflorus, commonly known as few flowered fringe lily, is a species of flowering plant in the Asparagaceae family, and is endemic to southern parts of Western Australia. It is a tufted perennial herb, with linear, flat leaves, and usually a single umbel of two to four purple flowers with lance-shaped sepals, elliptic, fringed petals and three stamens.

== Description ==
Thysanotus pauciflorus is a tufted perennial herb with a small rootstock enclosed by old leaf bases. Its five to seven leaves are linear, glabrous, 50–70 mm (2.0–2.8 in) long and 2–3 mm (0.079–0.118 in) wide. The flowers are usually borne in a single umbel with two to four purple flowers on a flowering stem about equal to the leaves and often low lying. Each flower is on a pedicel 5–8 mm (0.20–0.31 in) long. The perianth segments are about 11 mm (0.43 in) long, the sepals lance-shaped, 3–4 mm (0.12–0.16 in) wide. The petals are elliptic, 6–8 mm (0.24–0.31 in) wide, with a fringe about 2–3 mm (0.079–0.118 in) long. There are three stamens, the anthers about 3 mm (0.12 in) long and slightly curved. Flowering occurs from July to October, and the seeds are cylindrical, 2 mm (0.079 in) long and 1 mm (0.039 in) in diameter with a stalked, pale straw-coloured aril.

== Taxonomy ==
Thysanotus pauciflorus was first formally described in 1810 by Robert Brown in his Prodromus Florae Novae Hollandiae. The specific epithet (pauciflorus) means 'few-flowered'.

== Distribution and habitat ==
Few-flowered fringe lily grows in flats and dunes in sand in mallee eucalypt vegetation and low scrub in near coastal regions of the south coast of Western Australia, from the southern slopes of the Stirling Range to near Hopetoun in the Esperance Plains, Hampton and Mallee bioregions.

== Conservation status ==
Thysanotus multiflorus is listed as "not threatened" by the Government of Western Australia Department of Biodiversity, Conservation and Attractions.
