= Thysanotus brevifolius =

Scientific classification
- Kingdom: Plantae
- Clade: Tracheophytes
- Clade: Angiosperms
- Clade: Monocots
- Order: Asparagales
- Family: Asparagaceae
- Subfamily: Lomandroideae
- Genus: Thysanotus
- Species: T. brevifolius

Binomial name
- Thysanotus brevifolius N.H.Brittan

Species of plant

Thysanotus brevifolius is a species of flowering plant in the Asparagaceae family, and is endemic to the south of Western Australia. It is a tufted, rhizomatous, perennial herb, with narrow, flat leaves, umbels of 20 to 50 purple flowers with linear sepals, elliptic, fringed petals, six stamens and a straight style.

== Description ==
Thysanotus brevifolius is a tufted perennial herb with a small rootstock and fibrous roots. There are about 20 to 25 linear, narrow, flat and glabrous annual leaves up to 80 mm (3.1 in) long. The flowers are borne in umbels of 20 to 50 flowers on a scape 180–240 mm (7.1–9.4 in) long, each flower on a pedicel 8–10 mm (0.31–0.39 in) long. The flowers are purple, the perianth segments are 6–7 mm (0.24–0.28 in) long. The sepals are more or less lance-shaped, about 2 mm (0.079 in) wide and the petals are elliptic, 6–7 mm (0.24–0.28 in) wide with a fringe about 4 mm (0.16 in) long. There are six stamens, the anthers of different lengths, and the style is about 5 mm (0.20 in) long. Flowering occurs in November.

== Taxonomy ==
Thysanotus brevifolius was first formally described in 1960 by Norman Henry Brittan in the Journal of the Royal Society of Western Australia from specimens he collected 32 mi (51 km) north of Albany in 1958. The specific epithet (brevifolius) means 'short-leaved'.

== Distribution and habitat ==
This species grows sandy-loamy soils in open mallee heath, to the south and north-west of the Stirling Range, in the Avon Wheatbelt, Esperance Plains and Jarrah Forest bioregions of southern Western Australia.

== Conservation status ==
Thysanotus brevifolius is listed as "Priority Two" by the Government of Western Australia Department of Biodiversity, Conservation and Attractions, meaning that it is poorly known and from one or a few locations.
