= List of Liliales of South Africa =

Flowering plants in the order Liliales recorded from South Africa

Liliales is an order of monocotyledonous flowering plants in the Angiosperm Phylogeny Group and Angiosperm Phylogeny Web system, within the lilioid monocots. Both the order Lililiales and the family Liliaceae have had a widely disputed history, with the circumscription varying greatly from one taxonomist to another. Previous members of this order, which at one stage included most monocots with conspicuous tepals and lacking starch in the endosperm are now distributed over three orders, Liliales, Dioscoreales and Asparagales, using predominantly molecular phylogenetics. The newly delimited Liliales is monophyletic, with ten families. Thus circumscribed, this order consists mostly of herbaceous plants, but lianas and shrubs also occur. They are mostly perennial plants, with food storage organs such as corms or rhizomes. The order has worldwide distribution, and consists of 10 families, 67 genera and about 1,768 species.

The anthophytes are a grouping of plant taxa bearing flower-like reproductive structures. They were formerly thought to be a clade comprising plants bearing flower-like structures. The group contained the angiosperms - the extant flowering plants, such as roses and grasses - as well as the Gnetales and the extinct Bennettitales.

23,420 species of vascular plant have been recorded in South Africa, making it the sixth most species-rich country in the world and the most species-rich country on the African continent. Of these, 153 species are considered to be threatened. Nine biomes have been described in South Africa: Fynbos, Succulent Karoo, desert, Nama Karoo, grassland, savanna, Albany thickets, the Indian Ocean coastal belt, and forests.

The 2018 South African National Biodiversity Institute's National Biodiversity Assessment plant checklist lists 35,130 taxa in the phyla Anthocerotophyta (hornworts (6)), Anthophyta (flowering plants (33534)), Bryophyta (mosses (685)), Cycadophyta (cycads (42)), Lycopodiophyta (Lycophytes(45)), Marchantiophyta (liverworts (376)), Pinophyta (conifers (33)), and Pteridophyta (cryptogams (408)).

Five families are represented in the literature. Listed taxa include species, subspecies, varieties, and forms as recorded, some of which have subsequently been allocated to other taxa as synonyms, in which cases the accepted taxon is appended to the listing. Multiple entries under alternative names reflect taxonomic revision over time.

== Alstroemeriaceae ==
Family: Alstroemeriaceae,

=== Alstroemeria ===
Genus Alstroemeria:

- Alstroemeria pulchella L.f. not indigenous, cultivated, naturalised

== Colchicaceae ==
Family: Colchicaceae,

=== Androcymbium ===
Genus Androcymbium:

- Androcymbium albanense Schonland, accepted as Colchicum albanense (Schonland) J.C.Manning & Vinn. indigenous
  - Androcymbium albanense Schonland subsp. clanwilliamense Pedrola, Membrives & J.M.Monts. accepted as Colchicum clanwilliamense (Pedrola, Membrives & J.M.Monts.) J.C.Manning & Vinn. endemic
- Androcymbium albomarginatum Schinz, accepted as Colchicum albomarginatum (Schinz) J.C.Manning & Vinn. endemic
- Androcymbium asteroides J.C.Manning & Goldblatt, accepted as Colchicum asteroides (J.C.Manning & Goldblatt) J.C.Manning & Vinn. endemic
- Androcymbium austrocapense U.Mull.-Doblies & D.Mull.-Doblies, accepted as Colchicum austrocapense (U.Mull.-Doblies & D.Mull.-Doblies) J.C.Manning & Vinn. endemic
- Androcymbium bellum Schltr. & K.Krause, accepted as Colchicum bellum (Schltr. & K.Krause) J.C.Manning & Vinn. indigenous
- Androcymbium burchellii Baker, accepted as Colchicum coloratum J.C.Manning & Vinn. subsp. burchellii (Baker) J.C.Manning & Vinn. endemic
- Androcymbium burkei Baker, accepted as Colchicum burkei (Baker) J.C.Manning & Vinn. indigenous
- Androcymbium capense (L.) K.Krause, accepted as Colchicum capense (L.) J.C.Manning & Vinn. subsp. capense, endemic
- Androcymbium cedarbergense U.Mull.-Doblies, Hahnl, U.U.Mull.-Doblies & D.Mull.-Doblies, accepted as Colchicum cedarbergense (U.Mull.-Doblies, Hahnl. U.U.Mull.-Doblies & D.Mull.-Doblies) J.C.Manning &, endemic
- Androcymbium ciliolatum Schltr. & K.Krause, accepted as Colchicum capense (L.) J.C.Manning & Vinn. subsp. ciliolatum (Schltr. & K.Krause) J.C.Manning & Vinn, endemic
- Androcymbium circinatum Baker, accepted as Colchicum circinatum (Baker) J.C.Manning & Vinn. indigenous
  - Androcymbium circinatum Baker subsp. vestitum U.Mull.-Doblies & D.Mull.-Doblies, accepted as Colchicum circinatum (Baker) J.C.Manning & Vinn. subsp. vestitum (U.Mull.-Doblies & D.Mull.-Doblies), endemic
- Androcymbium crenulatum U.Mull.-Doblies, E.G.H.Oliv. & D.Mull.-Doblies, accepted as Colchicum crenulatum (U.Mull.-Doblies, E.G.H.Oliv. & D.Mull.-Doblies) J.C.Manning & Vinn. endemic
- Androcymbium crispum Schinz, accepted as Colchicum crispum (Schinz) J.C.Manning & Vinn. endemic
- Androcymbium cruciatum U.Mull.-Doblies & D.Mull.-Doblies, accepted as Colchicum cruciatum (U.Mull.-Doblies & D.Mull.-Doblies) J.C.Manning & Vinn. endemic
- Androcymbium cuspidatum Baker, accepted as Colchicum cuspidatum (Baker) J.C.Manning & Vinn. endemic
- Androcymbium decipiens N.E.Br. accepted as Colchicum decipiens (N.E.Br.) J.C.Manning & Vinn. endemic
- Androcymbium dregei C.Presl, accepted as Colchicum dregei (C.Presl) J.C.Manning & Vinn. endemic
- Androcymbium eghimocymbion U.Mull.-Doblies & D.Mull.-Doblies, accepted as Colchicum eghimbocymbion (U.Mull.-Doblies & D.Mull.-Doblies) J.C.Manning & Vinn. endemic
- Androcymbium eucomoides (Jacq.) Willd. accepted as Colchicum eucomoides (Jacq.) J.C.Manning & Vinn. endemic
- Androcymbium exiguum Roessler subsp. vogelii (U.Mull.-Doblies & D.Mull.-Doblies) U.Mull.-Doblies & D, accepted as Colchicum exiguum (Roessler) J.C.Manning & Vinn. subsp. vogelii (U.Mull.-Doblies & D.Mull.-Doblies), indigenous
- Androcymbium greuterocymbium U.Mull.-Doblies, Raus & D.Mull.-Doblies, accepted as Colchicum greuterocymbium (U.Mull.-Doblies, Raus & D.Mull.-Doblies) J.C.Manning & Vinn. endemic
- Androcymbium guttatum Schltr. & K.Krause, accepted as Colchicum circinatum (Baker) J.C.Manning & Vinn. subsp. circinatum, present
- Androcymbium hantamense Engl. accepted as Colchicum hantamense (Engl.) J.C.Manning & Vinn. endemic
- Androcymbium henssenianum U.Mull.-Doblies & D.Mull.-Doblies, accepted as Colchicum henssenianum (U.Mull.-Doblies & D.Mull.-Doblies) J.C.Manning & Vinn. endemic
- Androcymbium hughocymbion U.Mull.-Doblies & D.Mull.-Doblies, accepted as Colchicum hughocymbion (U.Mull.-Doblies & D.Mull.-Doblies) J.C.Manning & Vinn. endemic
- Androcymbium huntleyi Pedrola, Membrives, J.M.Monts. & Caujape, accepted as Colchicum huntleyi (Pedrola, Membrives, J.M.Monts. & Caujape) J.C.Manning & Vinn. endemic
- Androcymbium irroratum Schltr. & K.Krause, accepted as Colchicum irroratum (Schltr. & K.Krause) J.C.Manning & Vinn. endemic
- Androcymbium karooparkense U.Mull.-Doblies, Daber, J.M.Anderson & D.Mull.-Doblies, accepted as Colchicum karooparkense (U.Mull.-Doblies, Daber, J.M.Anderson & D.Mull.-Doblies) J.C.Manning & Vinn. endemic
- Androcymbium knersvlaktense U.Mull.-Doblies & D.Mull.-Doblies, accepted as Colchicum knersvlaktense (U.Mull.-Doblies & D.Mull.-Doblies) J.C.Manning & Vinn. endemic
- Androcymbium kunkelianum U.Mull.-Doblies, P.Hirsch, Stearn & D.Mull.-Doblies, accepted as Colchicum kunkelianum (U.Mull.-Doblies, P.Hirsch, Stearn & D.Mull.-Doblies) J.C.Manning & Vinn. endemic
- Androcymbium latifolium Schinz, accepted as Colchicum coloratum J.C.Manning & Vinn. subsp. coloratum, endemic
- Androcymbium leistneri U.Mull.-Doblies & D.Mull.-Doblies, accepted as Colchicum leistneri (U.Mull.-Doblies & D.Mull.-Doblies) C.Archer, indigenous
- Androcymbium longipes Baker, accepted as Colchicum longipes (Baker) J.C.Manning & Vinn. endemic
- Androcymbium melanthioides Willd. accepted as Colchicum melanthoides (Willd.) J.C.Manning & Vinn.
  - Androcymbium melanthioides Willd. subsp. australe U.Mull.-Doblies & D.Mull.-Doblies, accepted as Colchicum melanthoides (Willd.) J.C.Manning & Vinn. subsp. australe (U.Mull.-Doblies & D.Mull.-Dobli, endemic
  - Androcymbium melanthioides Willd. subsp. transvaalense U.Mull.-Doblies & D.Mull.-Doblies, accepted as Colchicum melanthoides (Willd.) J.C.Manning & Vinn. subsp. transvaalense (U.Mull.-Doblies & D.Mull.-, indigenous
  - Androcymbium melanthioides Willd. var. striatum (A.Rich.) Baker, accepted as Colchicum striatum (Hochst. ex A.Rich.) J.C.Manning & Vinn. present
  - Androcymbium melanthioides Willd. var. subulatum (Baker) Baker, accepted as Colchicum melanthoides (Willd.) J.C.Manning & Vinn. subsp. transvaalense (U.Mull.-Doblies & D.Mull.-, present
- Androcymbium natalense Baker, accepted as Colchicum natalense (Baker) J.C.Manning & Vinn. endemic
- Androcymbium orienticapense U.Mull.-Doblies & D.Mull.-Doblies, accepted as Colchicum orienticapense (U.Mull.-Doblies & D.Mull.-Doblies) J.C.Manning & Vinn. endemic
- Androcymbium poeltianum U.Mull.-Doblies & D.Mull.-Doblies, accepted as Colchicum poeltianum (U.Mull.-Doblies & D.Mull.-Doblies) J.C.Manning & Vinn. endemic
- Androcymbium praeirroratum U.Mull.-Doblies & D.Mull.-Doblies, accepted as Colchicum praeirroratum (U.Mull.-Doblies & D.Mull.-Doblies) J.C.Manning & Vinn. endemic
- Androcymbium pulchrum Schltr. & K.Krause, accepted as Colchicum coloratum J.C.Manning & Vinn. subsp. coloratum, present
- Androcymbium roseum Engl. accepted as Colchicum roseum (Engl.) J.C.Manning & Vinn. present
- Androcymbium scabromarginatum Schltr. & K.Krause, accepted as Colchicum scabromarginatum (Schltr. & K.Krause) J.C.Manning & Vinn. endemic
- Androcymbium schlechteri K.Krause, accepted as Colchicum albomarginatum (Schinz) J.C.Manning & Vinn. present
- Androcymbium stirtonii U.Mull.-Doblies, Raus, Weiglin & D.Mull.-Doblies, accepted as Colchicum stirtonii (U.Mull.-Doblies & D.Mull.-Doblies) J.C.Manning & Vinn. endemic
- Androcymbium striatum Hochst. ex A.Rich. accepted as Colchicum striatum (Hochst. ex A.Rich.) J.C.Manning & Vinn. indigenous
- Androcymbium swazicum U.Mull.-Doblies & D.Mull.-Doblies, accepted as Colchicum swazicum (U.Mull.-Doblies & D.Mull.-Doblies) J.C.Manning & Vinn. indigenous
- Androcymbium undulatum U.Mull.-Doblies & D.Mull.-Doblies, accepted as Colchicum undulatum (U.Mull.-Doblies & D.Mull.-Doblies) J.C.Manning & Vinn. endemic
- Androcymbium vanjaarsveldii U.Mull.-Doblies, Hahnl, U.U.Mull.-Doblies & D.Mull.-Doblies, accepted as Colchicum vanjaarsveldii (U.Mull.-Doblies, Hahnl. U.U.Mull.-Doblies & D.Mull.-Doblies) J.C.Manning, endemic
- Androcymbium villosum U.Mull.-Doblies & D.Mull.-Doblies, accepted as Colchicum villosum (U.Mull.-Doblies & D.Mull.-Doblies) J.C.Manning & Vinn. endemic
- Androcymbium volutare Burch. accepted as Colchicum volutare (Burch.) J.C.Manning & Vinn. endemic
- Androcymbium walteri Pedrola, Membrives & J.M.Monts. accepted as Colchicum walteri (Pedrola, Membrives & J.M.Monts.) J.C.Manning & Vinn. endemic
- Androcymbium worsonense U.Mull.-Doblies & D.Mull.-Doblies, accepted as Colchicum worsonense (U.Mull.-Doblies & D.Mull.-Doblies) J.C.Manning & Vinn. endemic

=== Baeometra ===
Genus Baeometra:

- Baeometra uniflora (Jacq.) G.J.Lewis, endemic

=== Camptorrhiza ===
Genus Camptorrhiza:

- Camptorrhiza strumosa (Baker) Oberm. indigenous

=== Colchicum ===
Genus Colchicum:

- Colchicum albanense (Schonland) J.C.Manning & Vinn. endemic
- Colchicum albofenestratum J.C.Manning & Snijman, endemic
- Colchicum albomarginatum (Schinz) J.C.Manning & Vinn. endemic
- Colchicum amphigaripense (U.Mull.-Doblies, Weiglin, M.Gottlieb & D.U.Mull.-Doblies) J.C.Manning & Vi, indigenous
- Colchicum asteroides (J.C.Manning & Goldblatt) J.C.Manning & Vinn. endemic
- Colchicum austrocapense (U.Mull.-Doblies & D.Mull.-Doblies) J.C.Manning & Vinn. endemic
- Colchicum bellum (Schltr. & K.Krause) J.C.Manning & Vinn. indigenous
- Colchicum burkei (Baker) J.C.Manning & Vinn. indigenous
- Colchicum capense (L.) J.C.Manning & Vinn. endemic
  - Colchicum capense (L.) J.C.Manning & Vinn. subsp. capense, endemic
  - Colchicum capense (L.) J.C.Manning & Vinn. subsp. ciliolatum (Schltr. & K.Krause) J.C.Manning & Vinn, endemic
- Colchicum cedarbergense (U.Mull.-Doblies, Hahnl. U.U.Mull.-Doblies & D.Mull.-Doblies) J.C.Manning &, endemic
- Colchicum circinatum (Baker) J.C.Manning & Vinn. endemic
  - Colchicum circinatum (Baker) J.C.Manning & Vinn. subsp. circinatum, endemic
  - Colchicum circinatum (Baker) J.C.Manning & Vinn. subsp. vestitum (U.Mull.-Doblies & D.Mull.-Doblies), endemic
- Colchicum clanwilliamense (Pedrola, Membrives & J.M.Monts.) J.C.Manning & Vinn. endemic
- Colchicum coloratum J.C.Manning & Vinn. endemic
  - Colchicum coloratum J.C.Manning & Vinn. subsp. burchellii (Baker) J.C.Manning & Vinn. endemic
  - Colchicum coloratum J.C.Manning & Vinn. subsp. coloratum, endemic
- Colchicum crenulatum (U.Mull.-Doblies, E.G.H.Oliv. & D.Mull.-Doblies) J.C.Manning & Vinn. endemic
- Colchicum crispum (Schinz) J.C.Manning & Vinn. endemic
- Colchicum cruciatum (U.Mull.-Doblies & D.Mull.-Doblies) J.C.Manning & Vinn. endemic
- Colchicum cuspidatum (Baker) J.C.Manning & Vinn. indigenous
- Colchicum decipiens (N.E.Br.) J.C.Manning & Vinn. endemic
- Colchicum dregei (C.Presl) J.C.Manning & Vinn. endemic
- Colchicum eghimbocymbion (U.Mull.-Doblies & D.Mull.-Doblies) J.C.Manning & Vinn. endemic
- Colchicum eucomoides (Jacq.) J.C.Manning & Vinn. endemic
- Colchicum exiguum (Roessler) J.C.Manning & Vinn. indigenous
  - Colchicum exiguum (Roessler) J.C.Manning & Vinn. subsp. vogelii (U.Mull.-Doblies & D.Mull.-Doblies), endemic
- Colchicum greuterocymbium (U.Mull.-Doblies, Raus & D.Mull.-Doblies) J.C.Manning & Vinn. endemic
- Colchicum hantamense (Engl.) J.C.Manning & Vinn. endemic
- Colchicum henssenianum (U.Mull.-Doblies & D.Mull.-Doblies) J.C.Manning & Vinn. endemic
- Colchicum hughocymbion (U.Mull.-Doblies & D.Mull.-Doblies) J.C.Manning & Vinn. endemic
- Colchicum huntleyi (Pedrola, Membrives, J.M.Monts. & Caujape) J.C.Manning & Vinn. endemic
- Colchicum irroratum (Schltr. & K.Krause) J.C.Manning & Vinn. endemic
- Colchicum karooparkense (U.Mull.-Doblies, Daber, J.M.Anderson & D.Mull.-Doblies) J.C.Manning & Vinn. endemic
- Colchicum knersvlaktense (U.Mull.-Doblies & D.Mull.-Doblies) J.C.Manning & Vinn. endemic
- Colchicum kunkelianum (U.Mull.-Doblies, P.Hirsch, Stearn & D.Mull.-Doblies) J.C.Manning & Vinn. endemic
- Colchicum leistneri (U.Mull.-Doblies & D.Mull.-Doblies) C.Archer, indigenous
- Colchicum longipes (Baker) J.C.Manning & Vinn. endemic
- Colchicum melanthoides (Willd.) J.C.Manning & Vinn. indigenous
  - Colchicum melanthoides (Willd.) J.C.Manning & Vinn. subsp. australe (U.Mull.-Doblies & D.Mull.-Dobli, endemic
  - Colchicum melanthoides (Willd.) J.C.Manning & Vinn. subsp. melanthoides, indigenous
  - Colchicum melanthoides (Willd.) J.C.Manning & Vinn. subsp. transvaalense (U.Mull.-Doblies & D.Mull.-, indigenous
  - Colchicum natalense]] (Baker) J.C.Manning & Vinn. endemic
- Colchicum orienticapense (U.Mull.-Doblies & D.Mull.-Doblies) J.C.Manning & Vinn. endemic
- Colchicum poeltianum (U.Mull.-Doblies & D.Mull.-Doblies) J.C.Manning & Vinn. endemic
- Colchicum praeirroratum (U.Mull.-Doblies & D.Mull.-Doblies) J.C.Manning & Vinn. endemic
- Colchicum scabromarginatum (Schltr. & K.Krause) J.C.Manning & Vinn. endemic
- Colchicum stirtonii (U.Mull.-Doblies & D.Mull.-Doblies) J.C.Manning & Vinn. endemic
- Colchicum striatum (Hochst. ex A.Rich.) J.C.Manning & Vinn. indigenous
- Colchicum swazicum (U.Mull.-Doblies & D.Mull.-Doblies) J.C.Manning & Vinn. indigenous
- Colchicum undulatum (U.Mull.-Doblies & D.Mull.-Doblies) J.C.Manning & Vinn. endemic
- Colchicum vanjaarsveldii (U.Mull.-Doblies, Hahnl. U.U.Mull.-Doblies & D.Mull.-Doblies) J.C.Manning, endemic
- Colchicum villosum (U.Mull.-Doblies & D.Mull.-Doblies) J.C.Manning & Vinn. endemic
- Colchicum volutare (Burch.) J.C.Manning & Vinn. endemic
- Colchicum walteri (Pedrola, Membrives & J.M.Monts.) J.C.Manning & Vinn. indigenous
- Colchicum worsonense (U.Mull.-Doblies & D.Mull.-Doblies) J.C.Manning & Vinn. endemic

=== Gloriosa ===
Genus Gloriosa:

- Gloriosa modesta (Hook.) J.C.Manning & Vinn. indigenous
- Gloriosa rigidifolia (Bredell) J.C.Manning & Vinn. endemic
- Gloriosa superba L. indigenous

=== Hexacyrtis ===
Genus Hexacyrtis:

- Hexacyrtis dickiana Dinter, indigenous

=== Iphigenia ===
Genus Iphigenia:

- Iphigenia bechuanica Baker, accepted as Iphigenia oliveri Engl. indigenous
- Iphigenia oliveri Engl. indigenous

=== Littonia ===
Genus Littonia:

- Littonia modesta Hook. accepted as Gloriosa modesta (Hook.) J.C.Manning & Vinn. indigenous
- Littonia rigidifolia Bredell, accepted as Gloriosa rigidifolia (Bredell) J.C.Manning & Vinn. endemic

=== Neodregea ===
Genus Neodregea:

- Neodregea glassii C.H.Wright, accepted as Wurmbea glassii (C.H.Wright) J.C.Manning & Vinn. endemic

=== Onixotis ===
Genus Onixotis:

- Onixotis punctata (L.) Mabb. accepted as Wurmbea punctata (L.) J.C.Manning & Vinn. endemic
- Onixotis stricta (Burm.f.) Wijnands, accepted as Wurmbea stricta (Burm.f.) J.C.Manning & Vinn. endemic
- Onixotis triquetra (L.f.) Mabb. accepted as Wurmbea stricta (Burm.f.) J.C.Manning & Vinn. present

=== Ornithoglossum ===
Genus Ornithoglossum:

- Ornithoglossum dinteri K.Krause, indigenous
- Ornithoglossum gracile B.Nord. endemic
- Ornithoglossum parviflorum B.Nord. indigenous
  - Ornithoglossum parviflorum B.Nord. var. namaquense B.Nord. endemic
  - Ornithoglossum parviflorum B.Nord. var. parviflorum, indigenous
- Ornithoglossum undulatum Sweet, indigenous
- Ornithoglossum viride (L.f.) Aiton, endemic
- Ornithoglossum vulgare B.Nord. indigenous
- Ornithoglossum zeyheri (Baker) B.Nord. endemic

=== Sandersonia ===
Genus Sandersonia:

- Sandersonia aurantiaca Hook. indigenous

=== Wurmbea ===
Genus Wurmbea:

- Wurmbea angustifolia B.Nord. indigenous
- Wurmbea burttii B.Nord. indigenous
- Wurmbea capensis Thunb. endemic
  - Wurmbea capensis Thunb. var. inusta Baker, accepted as Wurmbea inusta (Baker) B.Nord. present
  - Wurmbea capensis Thunb. var. latifolia (Baker) Baker, accepted as Wurmbea variabilis B.Nord. present
  - Wurmbea capensis Thunb. var. longiflora (Baker) Baker, accepted as Wurmbea dolichantha B.Nord. present
  - Wurmbea capensis Thunb. var. purpurea (Aiton) Baker, accepted as Wurmbea marginata (Desr.) B.Nord. present
  - Wurmbea capensis Thunb. var. truncata (Schltdl.) Baker, accepted as Wurmbea monopetala (L.f.) B.Nord. present
- Wurmbea compacta B.Nord. endemic
- Wurmbea dolichantha B.Nord. endemic
- Wurmbea elatior B.Nord. indigenous
- Wurmbea elongata B.Nord. endemic
- Wurmbea glassii (C.H.Wright) J.C.Manning & Vinn. endemic
- Wurmbea hiemalis B.Nord. endemic
- Wurmbea inusta (Baker) B.Nord. endemic
- Wurmbea kraussii Baker, indigenous
- Wurmbea marginata (Desr.) B.Nord. endemic
- Wurmbea minima B.Nord. endemic
- Wurmbea monopetala (L.f.) B.Nord. endemic
- Wurmbea punctata (L.) J.C.Manning & Vinn. endemic
- Wurmbea pusilla E.Phillips, indigenous
- Wurmbea recurva B.Nord. endemic
- Wurmbea robusta B.Nord. endemic
- Wurmbea spicata (Burm.f.) T.Durand & Schinz, indigenous
  - Wurmbea spicata (Burm.f.) T.Durand & Schinz var. spicata, endemic
  - Wurmbea spicata (Burm.f.) T.Durand & Schinz var. ustulata (B.Nord.) B.Nord. endemic
- Wurmbea stricta (Burm.f.) J.C.Manning & Vinn. endemic
- Wurmbea tenuis (Hook.f.) Baker, indigenous
  - Wurmbea tenuis (Hook.f.) Baker subsp. australis B.Nord. indigenous
- Wurmbea variabilis B.Nord. endemic

== Liliaceae ==
Family: Liliaceae,

=== Lilium ===
Genus Lilium:

- Lilium formosanum Wallace, not indigenous, naturalised, invasive

=== Orchiastrum ===
Genus Orchiastrum:

- Orchiastrum aitonii Lem. accepted as Lachenalia orchioides (L.) Aiton subsp. orchioides, indigenous
- Orchiastrum glaucinum (Jacq.) Lem. accepted as Lachenalia orchioides (L.) Aiton subsp. glaucina (Jacq.) G.D.Duncan, indigenous
- Orchiastrum mutabile (Lodd. ex Sweet) Lem. accepted as Lachenalia mutabilis Lodd. ex Sweet, indigenous
- Orchiastrum pallida (Aiton) Lem. accepted as Lachenalia pallida Aiton, indigenous
- Orchiastrum virentiflavum Lem. accepted as Lachenalia orchioides (L.) Aiton subsp. orchioides, indigenous

=== Scillopsis ===
Genus Scillopsis:

- Scillopsis anguinea Sweet, accepted as Lachenalia anguinea Sweet, indigenous
- Scillopsis angustifolia (Jacq.) Lem. accepted as Lachenalia contaminata Aiton, indigenous
- Scillopsis bifolia (Ker Gawl.) Lem. accepted as Lachenalia rosea Andrews, indigenous
- Scillopsis contanimata (Aiton) Lem. accepted as Lachenalia contaminata Aiton, indigenous
- Scillopsis fragrans (Jacq.) Lem. accepted as Lachenalia pallida Aiton, indigenous
- Scillopsis hyacinthoides (Jacq.) Lem. accepted as Lachenalia contaminata Aiton, indigenous
- Scillopsis isopetala (Jacq.) Lem. accepted as Lachenalia isopetala Jacq. indigenous
- Scillopsis liliiflora (Jacq.) Lem. accepted as Lachenalia liliiflora Jacq. indigenous
- Scillopsis lucida (Ker Gawl.) Lem. accepted as Lachenalia pallida Aiton, indigenous
- Scillopsis mediana (Jacq.) Lem. accepted as Lachenalia mediana Jacq. indigenous
- Scillopsis nervosa (Ker Gawl.) Lem. accepted as Lachenalia nervosa Ker Gawl. indigenous
- Scillopsis orthopetala (Jacq.) Lem. accepted as Lachenalia orthopetala Jacq. indigenous
- Scillopsis patula (Jacq.) Lem. accepted as Lachenalia patula Jacq. indigenous
- Scillopsis purpurea (Jacq.) Lem. accepted as Lachenalia pallida Aiton, indigenous
- Scillopsis purpureo-caerulea (Jacq.) Lem. accepted as Lachenalia purpureo-caerulea Jacq. indigenous
- Scillopsis pustulata (Jacq.) Lem. accepted as Lachenalia pallida Aiton, indigenous
- Scillopsis racemosa (Ker Gawl.) Lem. accepted as Lachenalia pallida Aiton, indigenous
- Scillopsis rosea (Andrews) Lem. accepted as Lachenalia rosea Andrews, indigenous
- Scillopsis unicolor (Jacq.) Lem. accepted as Lachenalia pallida Aiton, indigenous
- Scillopsis unifolia (Jacq.) Lem. accepted as Lachenalia unifolia Jacq. indigenous
- Scillopsis violacea (Jacq.) Lem. accepted as Lachenalia violacea Jacq. indigenous

== Melanthiaceae ==
Family: Melanthiaceae,

=== Melanthium ===
Genus Melanthium:

- Melanthium massoniaefolium Andrews, accepted as Massonia bifolia (Jacq.) J.C.Manning & Goldblatt, indigenous

== Smilacaceae ==
Family: Smilacaceae,

=== Smilax ===
Genus Smilax:

- Smilax anceps Willd. indigenous
