= Koninklijke Algemeene Vereniging voor Bloembollencultuur =

The Koninklijke Algemeene Vereniging voor Bloembollencultuur, translated from Dutch as the Royal General Association for Bulb Culture, but more commonly known world-wide by the acronym of KAVB, is a trade association for the bulb horticulture sector, and was established in 1860. The association has a rural organization, within which regional groups and departments are active.

== Mission ==
The main activities of the association is its collective protection of members interests, and knowledge - and provision of information, and specialized service.

== Membership ==
The KAVB has approximately 2,200 members. Most of the members are independent entrepreneurs active in the introduction, production and trade of bulbs and bulbous flowers. The association represents the majority of participants in the Netherlands participating in the bulb sector.

== Bulb sector ==
The bulb sector in the Netherlands has a strong position on the world market. Approximately 70% of the world's production and 75% of the trade are realized in the Netherlands. Moreover, the production of bulbs and bulbous flowers abroad is mostly in Dutch hands. At the rural secretariat of the KAVB 20 employees are operative. The majority have daily contacts with members, and governments. Regional secretaries support the association work for the departments and groups in the various regions.

== International Cultivar Registration Authority (ICRA) ==
The KAVB acts as the International Cultivar Registration Authority (ICRA) for all Bulbous, cormous and tuberous-rooted ornamental plants, excluding Dahlia Cav., Lilium L., Narcissus L., Nerine Herb. and various Australian genera (1955)

The full list is as follows:

- Albuca L.
- Allium L.
- Alophia Herb.
- Alrawia (Wendelbo) K. Persson & Wendelbo
- Alstroemeria L.
- Amarcrinum Coutts
- Amarine Sealy
- Amarygia Cif. & Giacom.
- Amaryllis L.
- Ammocharis Herb.
- Amphisiphon W. F. Barker
- Ancrumia Harv. ex Baker
- Androcymbium Willd.
- Androsiphon Schltr.
- Anemone L.
- Anomatheca Ker Gawl.
- Antholyza L.
- Babiana Ker Gawl. ex Sims
- Baeometra Salisb. ex Endl.
- Belamcanda Adans.
- Bellevalia Lapeyr.
- Bessera Schult. f.
- Bloomeria Kellogg
- Bobartia L.
- Bomarea Mirb.
- Boophane Herb.
- Bowiea Harv. ex Hook. f.
- Brimeura Salisb.
- Brodiaea Sm.
- Brunscrinum anon.
- Brunserine Traub
- Brunsvigia Heist.
- Bulbine Wolf
- Bulbinella Kunth
- Bulbocodium L.
- Caliphruria Herb.
- Calla L.
- Calochortus Pursh
- Caloscordum Herb.
- Camassia Lindl.
- Camptorrhiza Hutch.
- Canna L.
- Chasmanthe N. E. Br.
- Chionodoxa Boiss.
- Chlidanthus Herb.
- Chlorogalum Kunth
- Colchicum L.
- Corydalis DC.
- Crinum L.
- Crocosmia Planch.
- Crocus L.
- Curculigo Gaertn.
- Cypella Herb.
- Cyrtanthus Aiton
- Daubenya Lindl.
- Dichelostemma Kunth
- Dierama K. Koch
- Dietes Salisb. ex Klatt
- Dipcadi Medik.
- Drimia Jacq. ex Willd.
- Drimiopsis Lindl. & Paxton
- Elisena Herb.
- Eranthis Salisb.
- Eremurus M. Bieb.
- Erythronium L.
- Eucharis Planch. & Linden
- Eucomis L'Hér.
- Eucrosia Ker Gawl.
- Eustephia Cav.
- Ferraria Burm. ex Mill.
- Fortunatia J. F. Macbr.
- Freesia Klatt
- Fritillaria L.
- Fumaria L.
- Galanthus L.
- Galaxia Thunb.
- Galtonia Decne.
- Geissorhiza Ker Gawl.
- Gelasine Herb.
- Gilliesia Lindl.
- Gladiolus L.
- Gloriosa L.
- Griffinia Ker Gawl.
- Gynandriris Parl.
- Habranthus Herb.
- Haemanthus L.
- Hannonia Braun-Blanq. & Maire
- Hastingsia S. Watson
- Hepatica Mill.
- Herbertia Sweet
- Hermodactylus Mill.
- Hesperantha Ker Gawl.
- Hesperocallis A. Gray
- Hexacyrtis Dinter
- Hippeasprekelia anon.
- Hippeastrum Herb.
- Homeria Vent.
- Hyacinthella Schur
- Hyacinthoides Heist. ex Fabr.
- Hyacinthus L.
- Hymenocallis Salisb.
- Hypoxis L.
- Ipheion Raf.
- Iphigenia Kunth
- Iris L.
- Ixia L.
- Ixiolirion Herb.
- Korolkowia Regel
- Lachenalia J. Jacq. ex Murray
- Lapeirousia Pourr.
- Lapiedra Lag.
- Ledebouria Roth
- Leopoldia Parl.
- Leucocoryne Lindl.
- Leucojum L.
- Litanthus Harv.
- Littonia Hook.
- Lloydia Rchb.
- Lycoris Herb.
- Massonia Thunb. ex Houtt.
- Melasphaerula Ker Gawl.
- Merendera Ramond
- Milla Cav.
- Molineria Colla
- Moraea Mill.
- Muilla S. Watson ex Benth.
- Muscari Mill.
- Muscarimia Kostel. ex Losinsk.
- Nectaroscordum Lindl.
- Neodregea C. H. Wright
- Neomarica Herb.
- Neopatersonia Schonl.
- Notholirion Wall. ex Boiss.
- Nothoscordum Kunth
- Onixotis Raf.
- Ornithogalum L.
- Ornithoglossum Salisb.
- Oxalis L.
- Pamianthe Stapf
- Pancratium L.
- Paramongaia Velarde
- Pardanthopsis (Hance) L. W. Lenz
- Phaedranassa Herb.
- Polyxena Kunth
- Pseudogaltonia (Kuntze) Engl.
- Pseudomuscari Garbari & Greuter
- Puschkinia Adams
- Ranunculus L.
- Rhadamanthus Salisb.
- Rhodocodon Baker
- Rhodohypoxis Nel
- Rhodophiala C. Presl
- Rhodoxis anon.
- Rigidella Lindl.
- Roscoea Sm.
- Sandersonia Hook.
- Scadoxus Raf.
- Schizobasis Baker
- Schizostylis Backh. & Harv.
- Schoenolirion Torr.
- Scilla L.
- Simethis Kunth
- Solenomelus Miers
- Sparaxis Ker Gawl.
- Sprekelia Heist.
- Stenomesson Herb.
- Sternbergia Waldst. & Kit.
- Sypharissa Salisb.
- Syringodea Hook.
- Tecophilaea Bertero ex Colla
- Thuranthos C. H. Wright
- Tigridia Juss.
- Trimezia Salisb. ex Herb.
- Tristagma Poepp.
- Triteleia Douglas ex Lindl.
- Tritonia Ker Gawl.
- Tulbaghia L.
- Tulipa L.
- Urceolina Roxb.
- Urginea Steinh.
- Vagaria Herb.
- Veltheimia Gled.
- Watsonia Mill.
- Whiteheadia Harv.
- Wurmbea Thunb.
- Zantedeschia Spreng.
- Zephyranthes Herb.
- Zigadenus sensu lato, including Amianthium, Anticlea, Stenanthium, Toxicoscordion and Zigadenus sensu stricto.
