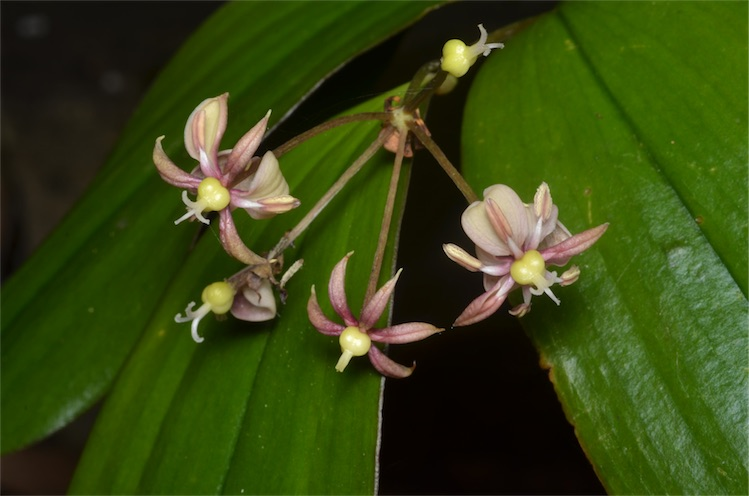

Scientific classification
- Kingdom: Plantae
- Clade: Tracheophytes
- Clade: Angiosperms
- Clade: Monocots
- Order: Liliales
- Family: Colchicaceae
- Genus: Kuntheria; Conran & Clifford
- Species: K. pedunculata

Binomial name
- Kuntheria pedunculata (F.Muell) Conran & Clifford

= Kuntheria =

Genus of flowering plants

Kuntheria is a plant genus related to Schelhammera. It contains one species, Kuntheria pedunculata (F.Muell.) Conran & Clifford, endemic to Queensland, Australia.
