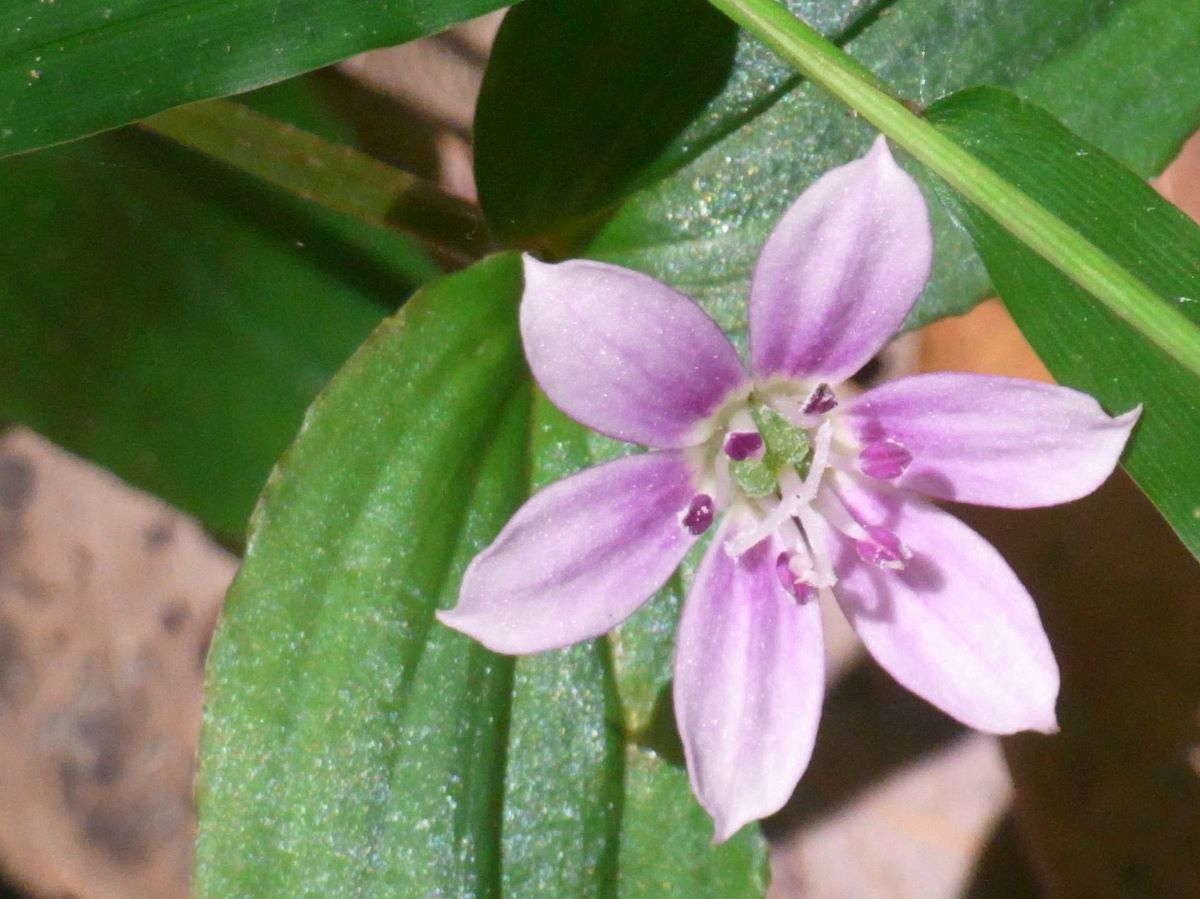
- Schelhammera undulata, Chatswood West, Australia

Scientific classification
- Kingdom: Plantae
- Clade: Tracheophytes
- Clade: Angiosperms
- Clade: Monocots
- Order: Liliales
- Family: Colchicaceae
- Genus: Schelhammera
- Species: S. undulata

Binomial name
- Schelhammera undulata R.Br.

Synonyms
- Parduyna undulata (R.Br.) Dandy

= Schelhammera undulata =

Lilac lily

Species of flowering plant

Schelhammera undulata, the lilac lily, is a small plant found in eastern Australia. Widely distributed south of Lismore, New South Wales, though not commonly seen.

The habitat is moist sites on the forest floor, it grows to 20 cm high. Leaves are hairless, egg-shaped to lanceolate in shape 20 to 50 mm long, 7 to 18 mm wide, with wavy edges. Attractive flowers form in spring. The six petals are pink with purple anthers, flowers around 15 mm across. A wrinkled ovoid capsule forms, 2 to 4 mm wide. Inside are a small number of yellow or brown seeds.

The species first appeared in scientific literature in Prodromus Florae Novae Hollandiae in 1810, authored by Robert Brown.
