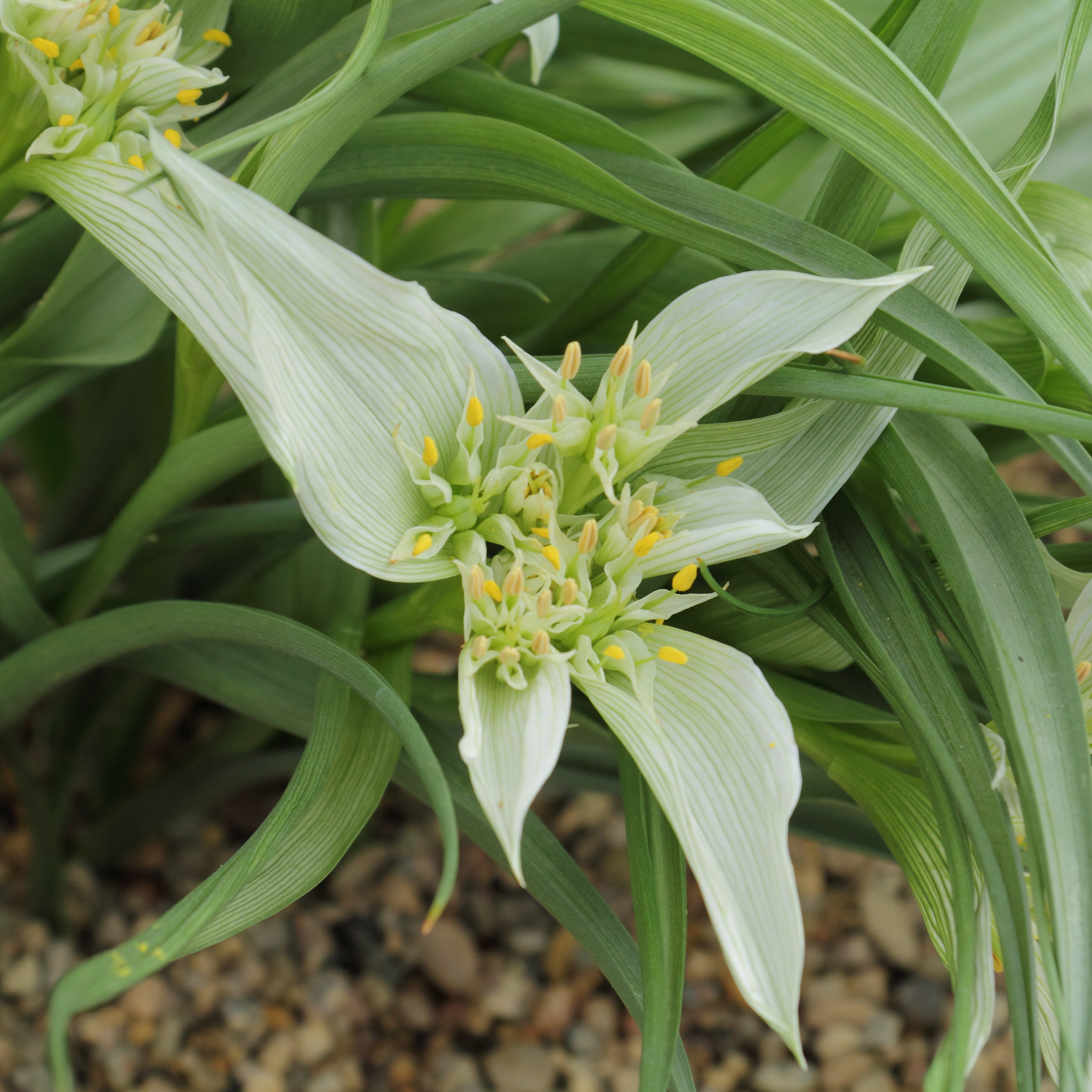

Scientific classification
- Kingdom: Plantae
- Clade: Tracheophytes
- Clade: Angiosperms
- Clade: Monocots
- Order: Liliales
- Family: Colchicaceae
- Genus: Androcymbium
- Species: A. melanthioides

Binomial name
- Androcymbium melanthioides Willd.

= Androcymbium melanthioides =

African crocus

Species of plant

Androcymbium melanthioides (the African crocus, Afrikaans: bobbejaanskoen, "baboon shoe") is a plant native to Namibia and South Africa. It is not found in KwaZulu-Natal and is registered under the SANBI Red List as "safe" (LC).

There are three subspecies:

- Androcymbium melanthioides subsp. australe
- Androcymbium melanthioides subsp. melanthioides
- Androcymbium melanthioides subsp. transvaalense

The plant is a geophyte with an asymmetrical bulb covered in black fibrous tissue. The sepals are satiny in texture and range from light pink to light purple to light green in color, with many small flowers within.
