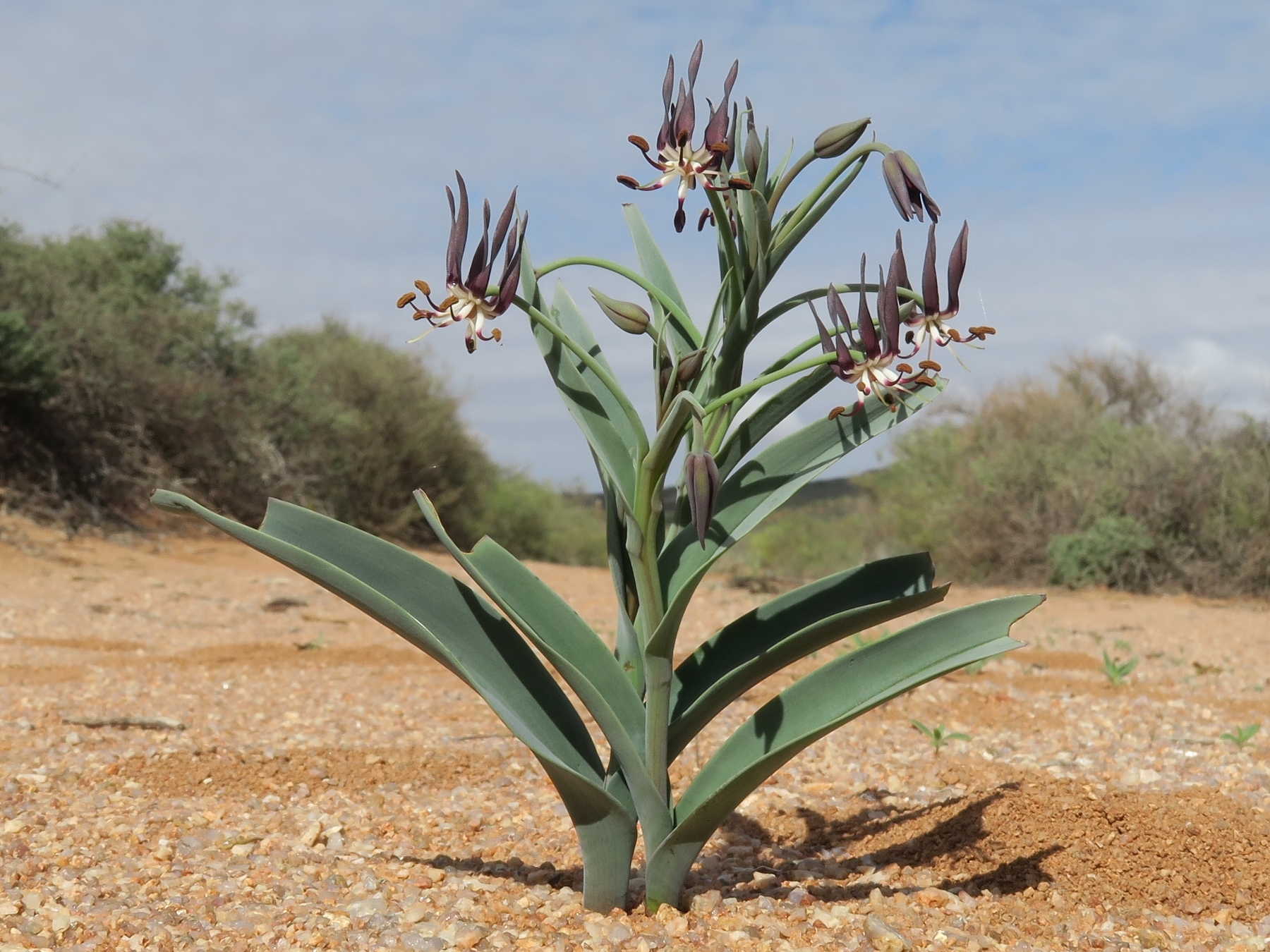

Scientific classification
- Kingdom: Plantae
- Clade: Tracheophytes
- Clade: Angiosperms
- Clade: Monocots
- Order: Liliales
- Family: Colchicaceae
- Genus: Ornithoglossum
- Species: O. vulgare

Binomial name
- Ornithoglossum vulgare B.Nord.

= Ornithoglossum vulgare =

Species of flower

Ornithoglossum vulgare (Afrikaans: slangkop) is a lily characterized by blueish to grey-green, boat-shaped leaves, which clasp the stem and an attractive flower arrangement. The plant usually grows to about 30 cm high, but can grow taller if it receives more moisture.

Ornithoglossum vulgare is widely distributed throughout the arid and semi-arid areas of Namibia, South Africa and East Africa. It is absent from the very northern part of Namibia. In Namibia, this plant occurs mainly on plains, but is occasionally also found on rocky slopes.

This bulb is toxic and can be a problem in rangelands.
