= International Cultivar Registration Authority =

Type of organization responsible for standardizing names of plant cultivars

An International Cultivation Registration Authority (ICRA) is an organization responsible for ensuring that the names of plant cultivars and cultivar groups are defined and not duplicated.

The ICRA system was established more 50 years ago, and operates under the International Code of Nomenclature for Cultivated Plants (ICNCP), which in turn works with the International Code of Nomenclature for algae, fungi, and plants. Its chief aim is to prevent duplicated uses of epithets for cultivars and cultivar groups within a defined denomination class (usually a genus), and to ensure that names are in accord with the latest edition of the ICNCP. Each name designation must be formally established by being published in hard copy, with a description in a dated publication.

The International Society for Horticultural Science appoints and monitors all ICRAs. At present it recognizes over 70 ICRAs, ranging from societies focused on a specific genus (such as Clivia, Quercus, or Saxifraga), through organizations with broader sets of interests (including the Singapore Botanic Gardens and the United States National Arboretum), to individuals.

== Scope of authority ==
The system is both voluntary, and non-statutory and it does not confer any legal protection over the name or the plant. Such protection has to be sought through statutory schemes such as plant breeders' rights, sometimes called "plant patents", which differ between counties. The ICRA system is in effect the horticultural world's attempt at self-policing of nomenclature and is truly international in its scope. ICRAs are not responsible for assessing the distinctiveness of the plant in question.

== How it operates ==
The ICRA system depends upon the co-operation of all involved with the creation and marketing of new plants. Normally, all that is required is the submission of the plant name and any other required data to the ICRA, and in most cases there is no direct cost to the applicant. Although an ICRA is entitled to charge a small fee to cover their costs, most provide this indispensable service without charge.

The ICRA will:

- check each new name (termed an epithet) to ensure that it has not been used before,
- validate that in all other respects it is in accord with the ICNCP,
- finally, notify the registrant of the success, or not, of the application.

Applicants must understand that registration will be refused if the name has been used before and should always await the ICRA's decision before implementing any marketing for the plant, the ICRA are not responsible for any losses incurred in this respect.

== Formally establishing names ==
Each ICRA is also charged with the responsibility of ensuring that new names are formally established (i.e. published in hard copy, with a description in a dated publication). Establishment in this context is an important concept since it is only after such publication that the name has precedence for its use for a particular plant.

Whilst the ICRA will ensure through its own publications that names are established, it is recommended that registrants should not necessarily rely on this and should also try to ensure that their new names are securely established as soon after registration as possible.

It is not sufficient to release details onto the Internet, as that is not considered to be hard copy.

== See also ==
- Australian Cultivar Registration Authority
- Koninklijke Algemeene Vereniging voor Bloembollencultuur
- Registration authority
- Royal Horticultural Society
