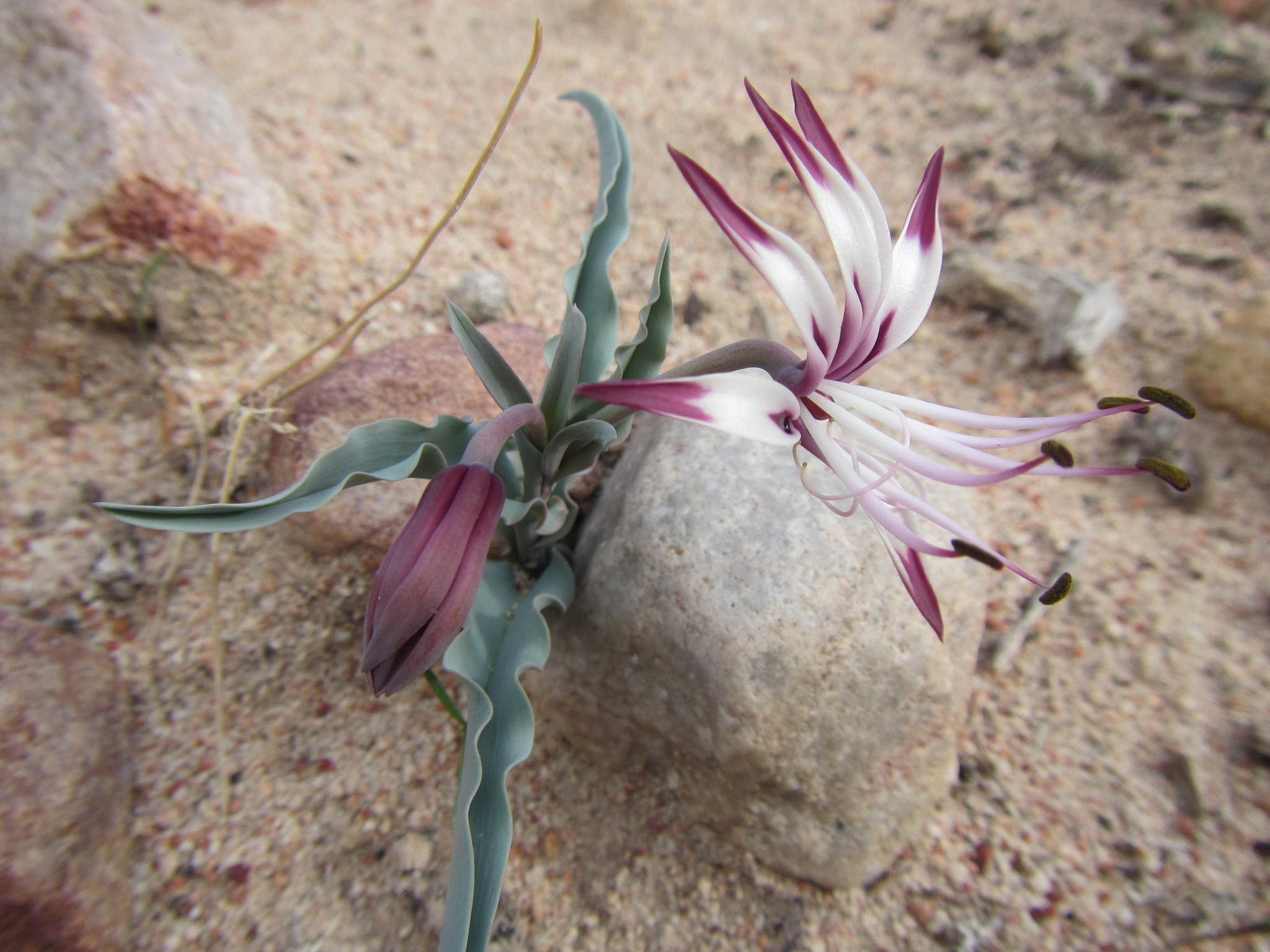

Scientific classification
- Kingdom: Plantae
- Clade: Tracheophytes
- Clade: Angiosperms
- Clade: Monocots
- Order: Liliales
- Family: Colchicaceae
- Genus: Ornithoglossum
- Species: O. undulatum

Binomial name
- Ornithoglossum undulatum Sweet, 1825

= Ornithoglossum undulatum =

Species of flowering plant in the family Colchicaceae

Ornithoglossum undulatum, also known as the Karoo Slangkop, is a species of flowering plant in the family Colchicaceae. It is found in Southern Namibia and South Africa. In South Africa its range extends as far east as Somerset East in Eastern Cape Province. O. undulatum is a poisonous plant, and consumption of the leaves can kill livestock.

It is also known as the poison onion, cockatoo snakelily, or wave-leaved bird's tongue. The Afrikaans moniker of slangkop means "snake's head," referring to the resemblance of their flowers to a snake's head.

While not rated under the IUCN Red List, the South African National Biodiversity Institute (SANBI) Red List rates this species as "least concern" as of 2005.

== Description ==
The plant can grow from 5 to 20 centimeters in height. There are two to four leaves that are lanceolate in shape which are undulated, the leaves are 10 centimeters in length and are a blue-grey color. The flowers are zygomorphic and nodding downwards on pedicels, they range in color from white to pink, with maroon tips, and are fragrant during the night. The plant flowers between the months of April and July. They are most often found on rocky terrain, usually in granite or sandstone slopes. The plants are perennials and have an underground corm.

== Distribution ==
Ornithoglossum undulatum is found within the provinces of Eastern Cape, Northern Cape, Western Cape in South Africa. In Namibia it is found throughout the ǁKaras Region, concentrated in the Richtersveld and Namaqualand regions.

== Cultivation ==
Ornithoglossum undulatum grows well in well drained soil with moderate or little watering required. The plant favors heavy sunlight, owing to its desert habitat.
