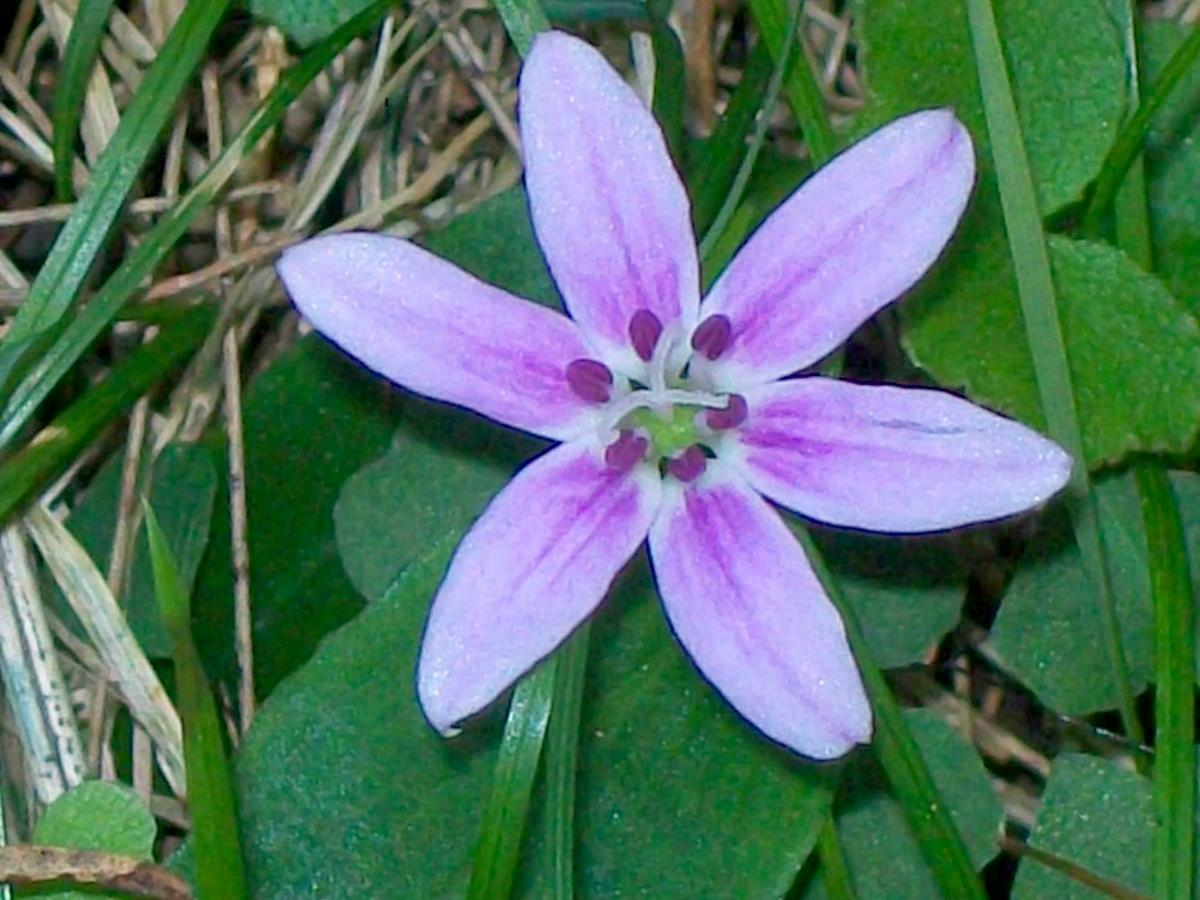
- Schelhammera undulata

Scientific classification
- Kingdom: Plantae
- Clade: Tracheophytes
- Clade: Angiosperms
- Clade: Monocots
- Order: Liliales
- Family: Colchicaceae
- Genus: Schelhammera; R.Br.

Synonyms
- Kreisigia F.Muell. Kreysigia Rchb. Parduyna Salisb.

= Schelhammera =

Genus of flowering plants

Schelhammera is a genus of perennial flowering plants in the family Colchicaceae, comprising two species.

- Schelhammera undulata R.Br., native to New South Wales and Victoria
- Schelhammera multiflora R.Br., native to Queensland, New Guinea and Malesia.

The genus was first formerly described by botanist Robert Brown in 1810 in Prodromus Florae Novae Hollandiae. The genus was named in honour of Günther Christoph Schelhammer.

The genus Kuntheria was described for the third species of Schelhammera, namely Schelhammera pedunculata, by Clifford and Conran for the Australian Flora in 1987. The German botanist Mueller who described it had stated that this taxon "either requires specific distinction, or should perhaps be regarded as a gigantic form of S. multiflora".
