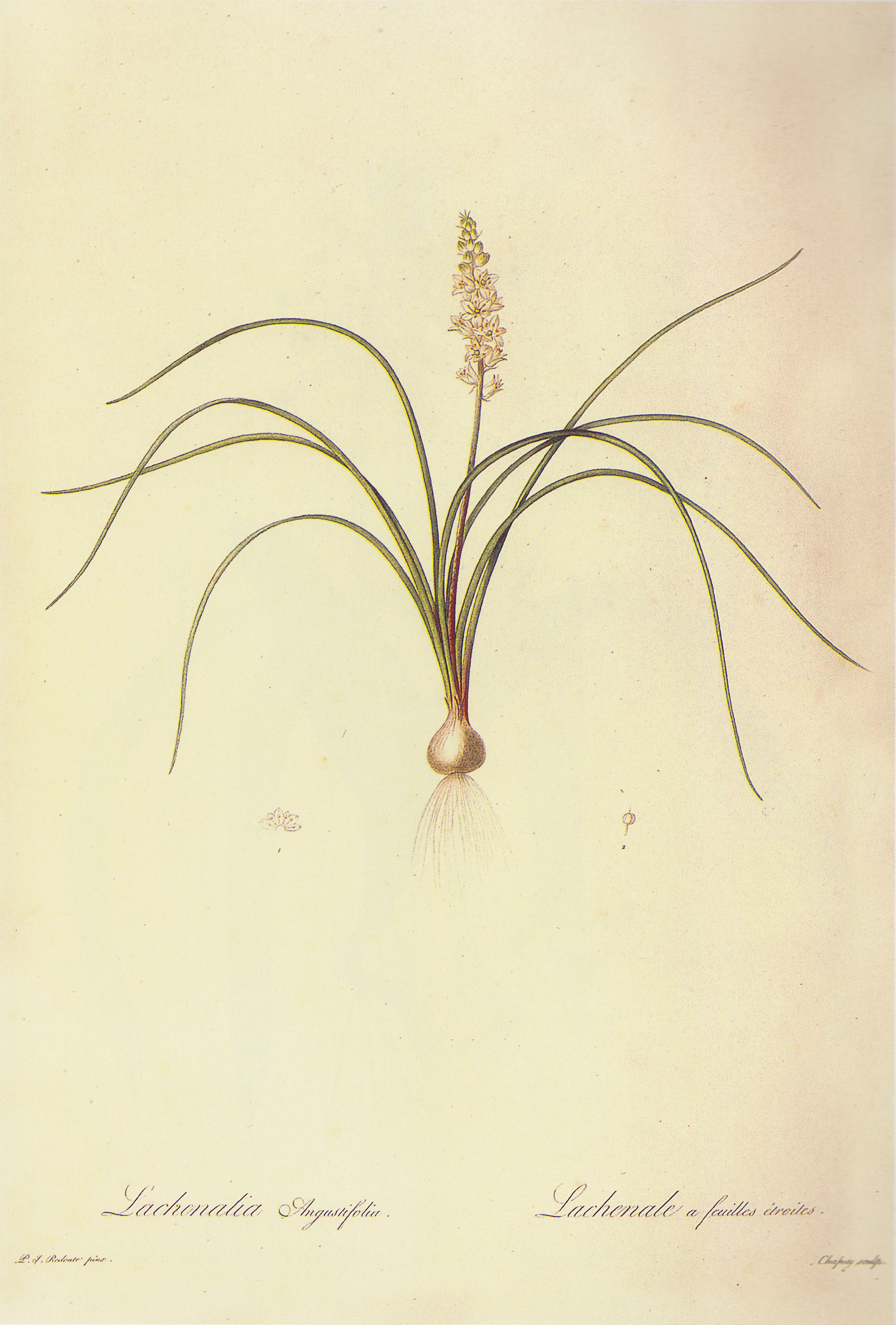
- L. contaminata (Redouté)

Scientific classification
- Kingdom: Plantae
- Clade: Tracheophytes
- Clade: Angiosperms
- Clade: Monocots
- Order: Asparagales
- Family: Asparagaceae
- Subfamily: Scilloideae
- Genus: Lachenalia
- Species: L. contaminata

Binomial name
- Lachenalia contaminata Soland.

= Lachenalia contaminata =

Species of flowering plant

Lachenalia contaminata (wild hyacinth) is a species of flowering plant in the family Asparagaceae, native to the Western Cape of South Africa. It is a bulbous perennial growing to 25 cm (10 in) tall, with grass-like leaves and fleshy stems bearing brushlike white flowers tipped with maroon in spring.

The Latin specific epithet contaminata refers to the flowers which appear to be "contaminated" with red or brown markings.

This plant requires a sheltered, frost-free position or under glass.
