= Hexacyrtis =

Namib lily

Scientific classification
- Kingdom: Plantae
- Clade: Tracheophytes
- Clade: Angiosperms
- Clade: Monocots
- Order: Liliales
- Family: Colchicaceae
- Genus: Hexacyrtis; Dinter
- Species: H. dickiana

Binomial name
- Hexacyrtis dickiana Dinter

Genus of flowering plants

Hexacyrtis, common name Namib lily, is a plant genus native to Namibia and the Cape Provinces of South Africa but cultivated elsewhere as an ornamental plant. At present (April 2014) only one species is recognized: Hexacyrtis dickiana Dinter. It bears an umbel with nodding flowers, the tepals recurved, red towards the tips but yellow near the center.
