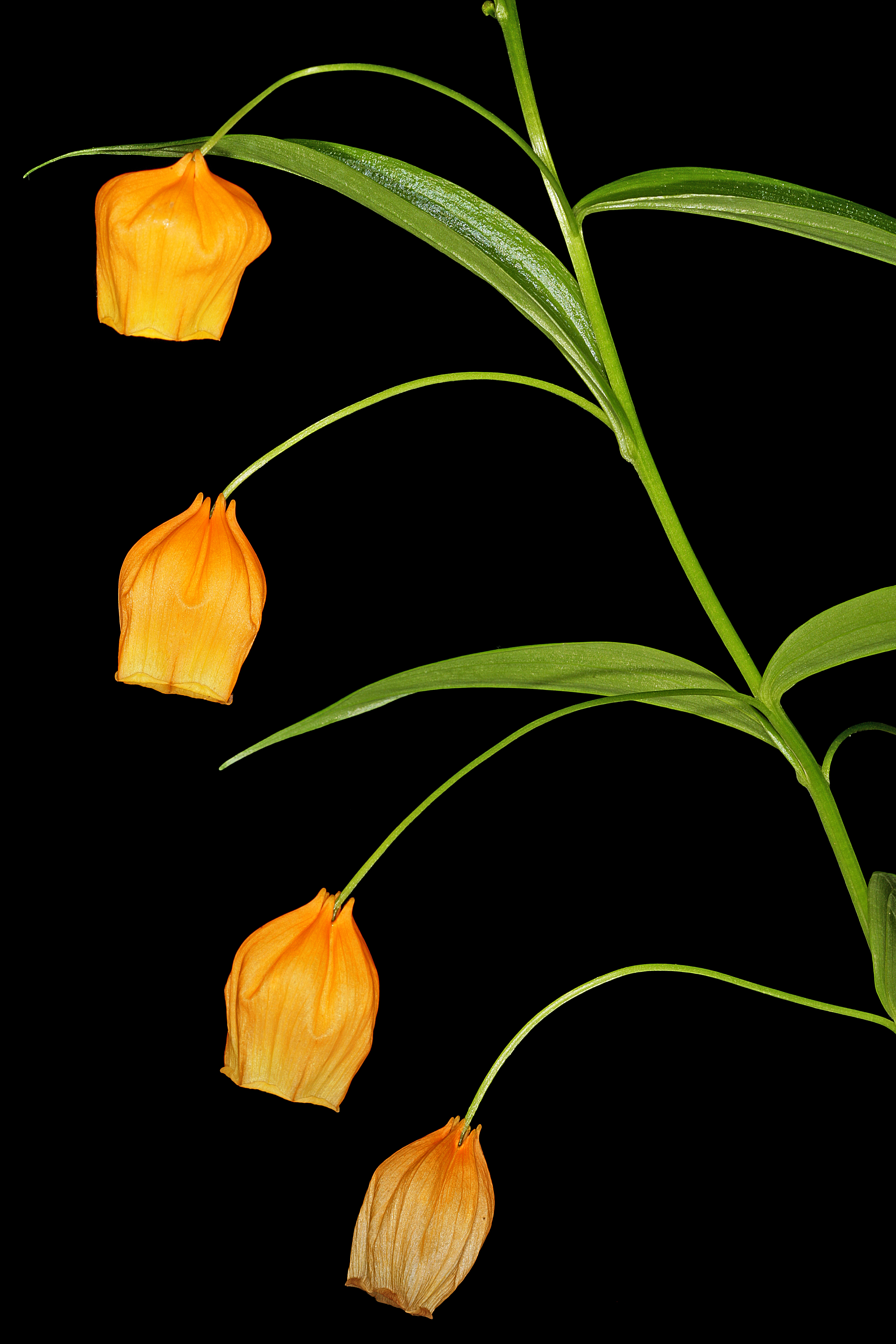

Scientific classification
- Kingdom: Plantae
- Clade: Tracheophytes
- Clade: Angiosperms
- Clade: Monocots
- Order: Liliales
- Family: Colchicaceae
- Genus: Sandersonia; Hook.
- Species: S. aurantiaca

Binomial name
- Sandersonia aurantiaca Hook.

= Sandersonia =

Genus of plants

Sandersonia is a monotypic genus of rhizomatous plant, belonging to the family Colchicaceae, the single species Sandersonia aurantiaca being native to South Africa (the Cape Provinces, KwaZulu-Natal and the Northern Provinces) and Eswatini (Swaziland). Common names for S. aurantiaca include Christmas bells, golden lily of the valley, Chinese lantern lily and Chinese lantern bulb. S. aurantiaca is a perennial plant of trailing growth that can reach 30 inches in height. The flowers are yellow or orange.

== Care ==
Sandersonia aurantiaca thrives in well-drained sandy soil enriched with compost and enjoys full sun, but not excessive heat (under which condition it requires frequent watering). A delicate plant, it bruises easily if handled carelessly. The growth habit is upright but lax, with plants benefitting from staking. Herbaceous perennials, Sandersonias die back naturally at the end of the season, surviving the winter in zones 9 and 10. They do well in San Francisco, San Diego, and other places with mild climates and are also suited to cultivation in glasshouses. Growth is slow for the first few years but becomes more rapid with each growing season, once the plants are fully established. When they have formed large enough clumps, they may be propagated by division.

The orange/yellow flowers resemble tiny Chinese Lanterns. The orange of the flowers of Sandersonia aurantiaca is, however, more yellow in tone than that of the inflated calyces of Physalis alkekengi (another plant known by the common name Chinese lantern). Of the two plants, Sandersonia is the more resistant to fungal disease.

== Toxicity, due to colchicine content ==
The corms of Sandersonia aurantiaca contain levels of the toxic alkaloid colchicine comparable to those in Gloriosa superba, another very poisonous plant belonging to the family Colchicaceae (named for the equally toxic Colchicum autumnale). The plant has been held responsible for at least one case of fatal poisoning, the victim being an 80-year-old Japanese woman who died nine days after eating the corms, after doctors failed in their attempts to reverse the decline in her white blood cell count. The toxic principle was determined to be colchicine, and this was the first occasion upon which the alkaloid was found to be present in Sandersonia aurantiaca.

== Gallery ==
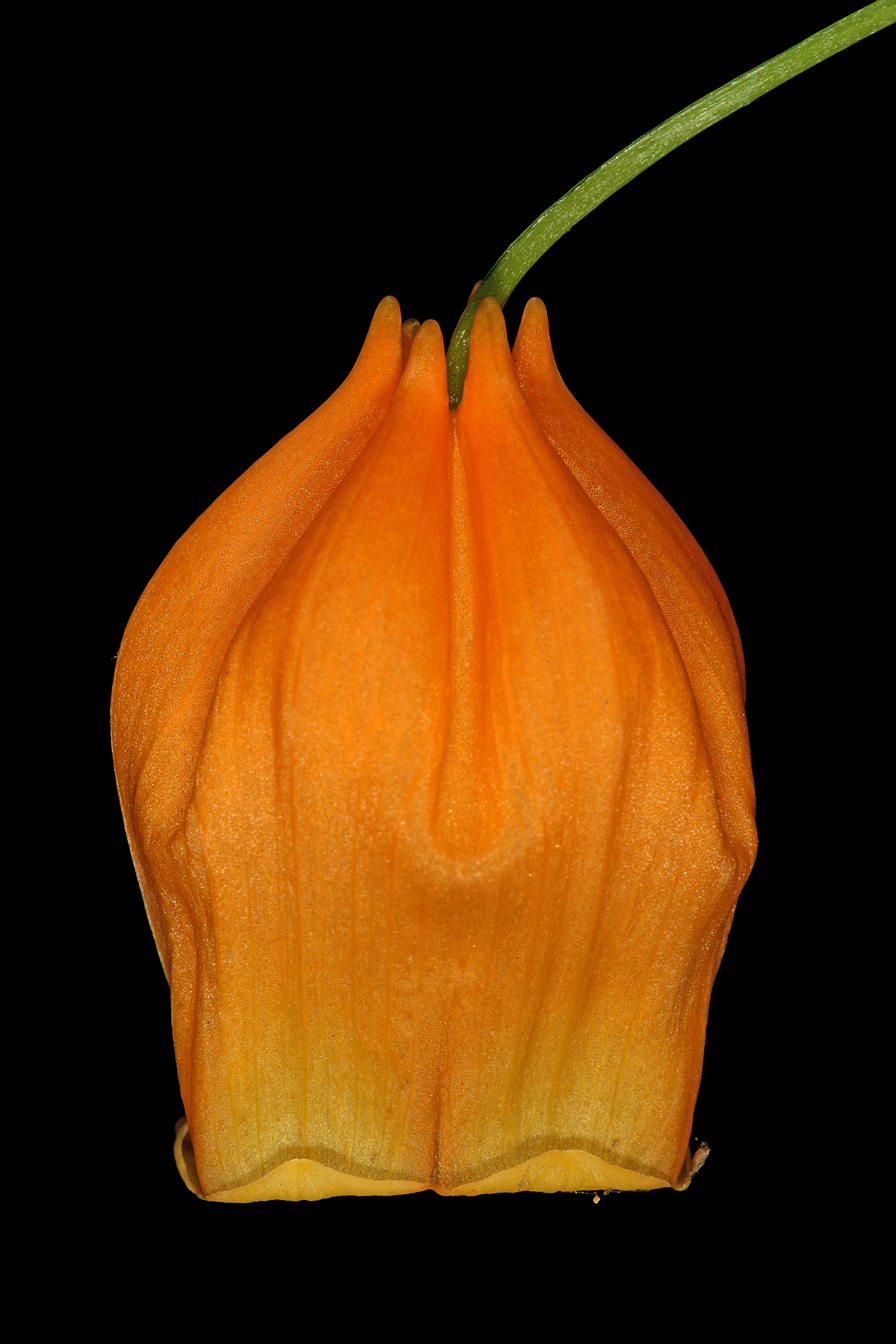
Side view of single flower.

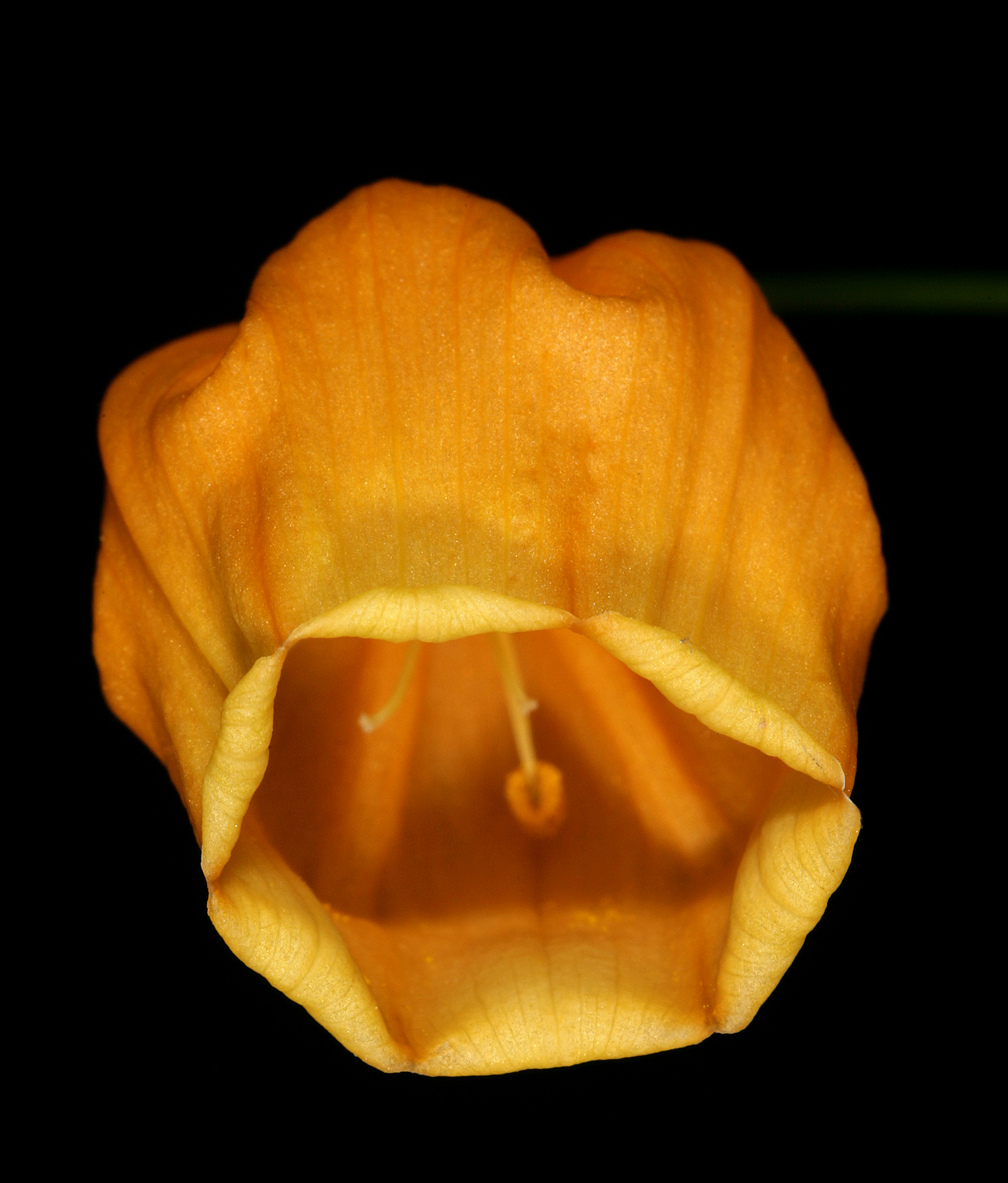
Single flower tilted to show mouth.

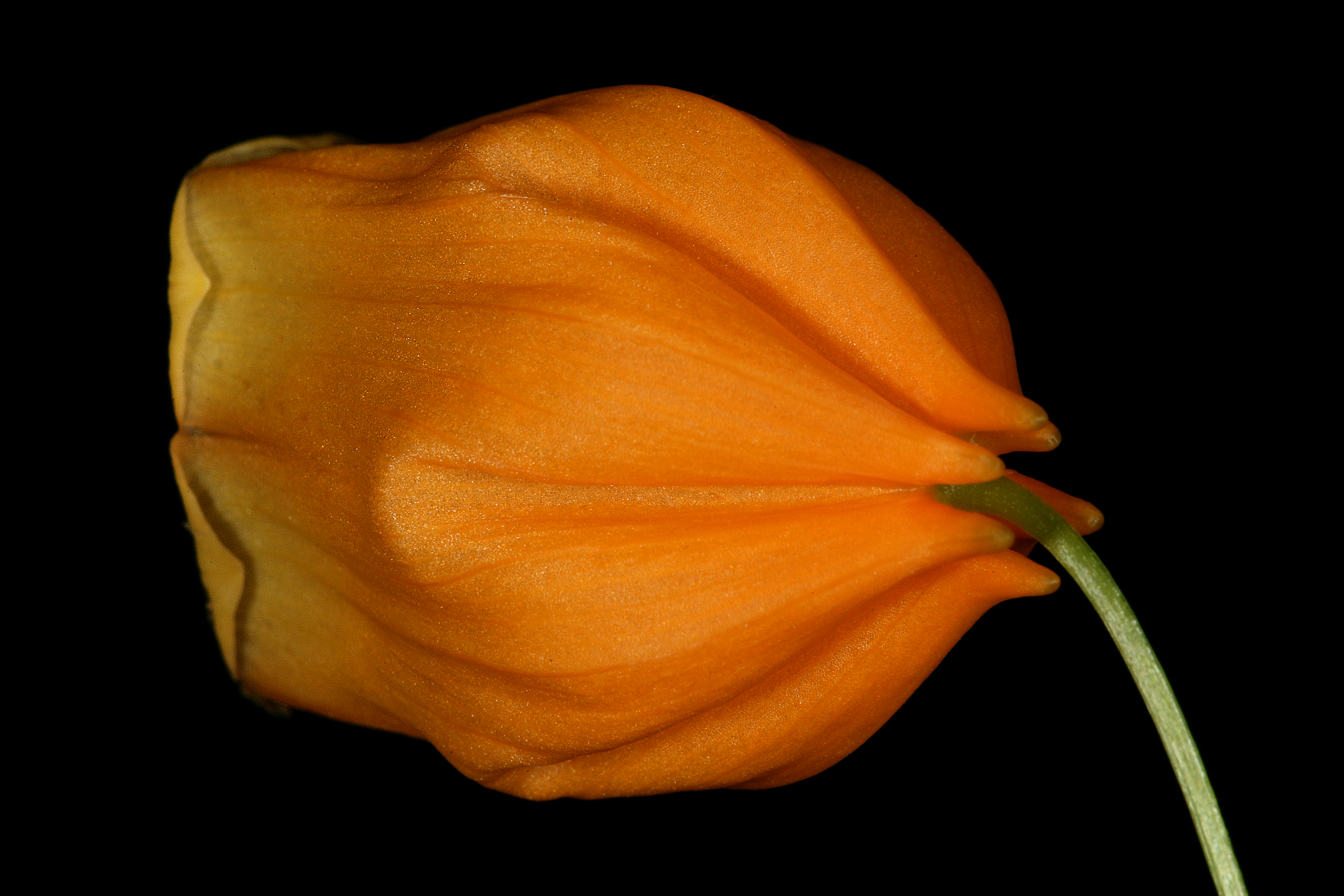
Single flower in semi-profile.

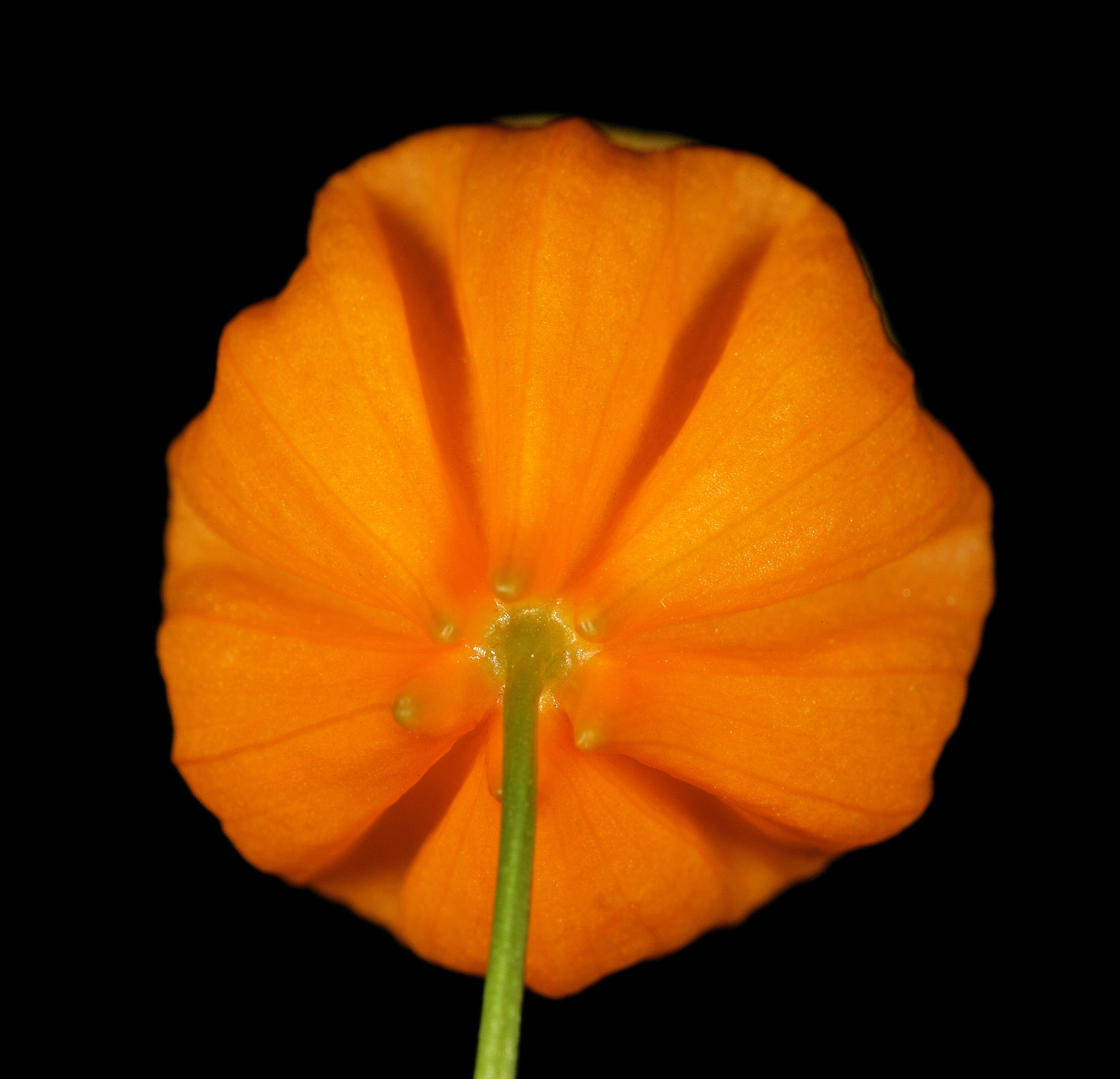
Rear view of single flower.

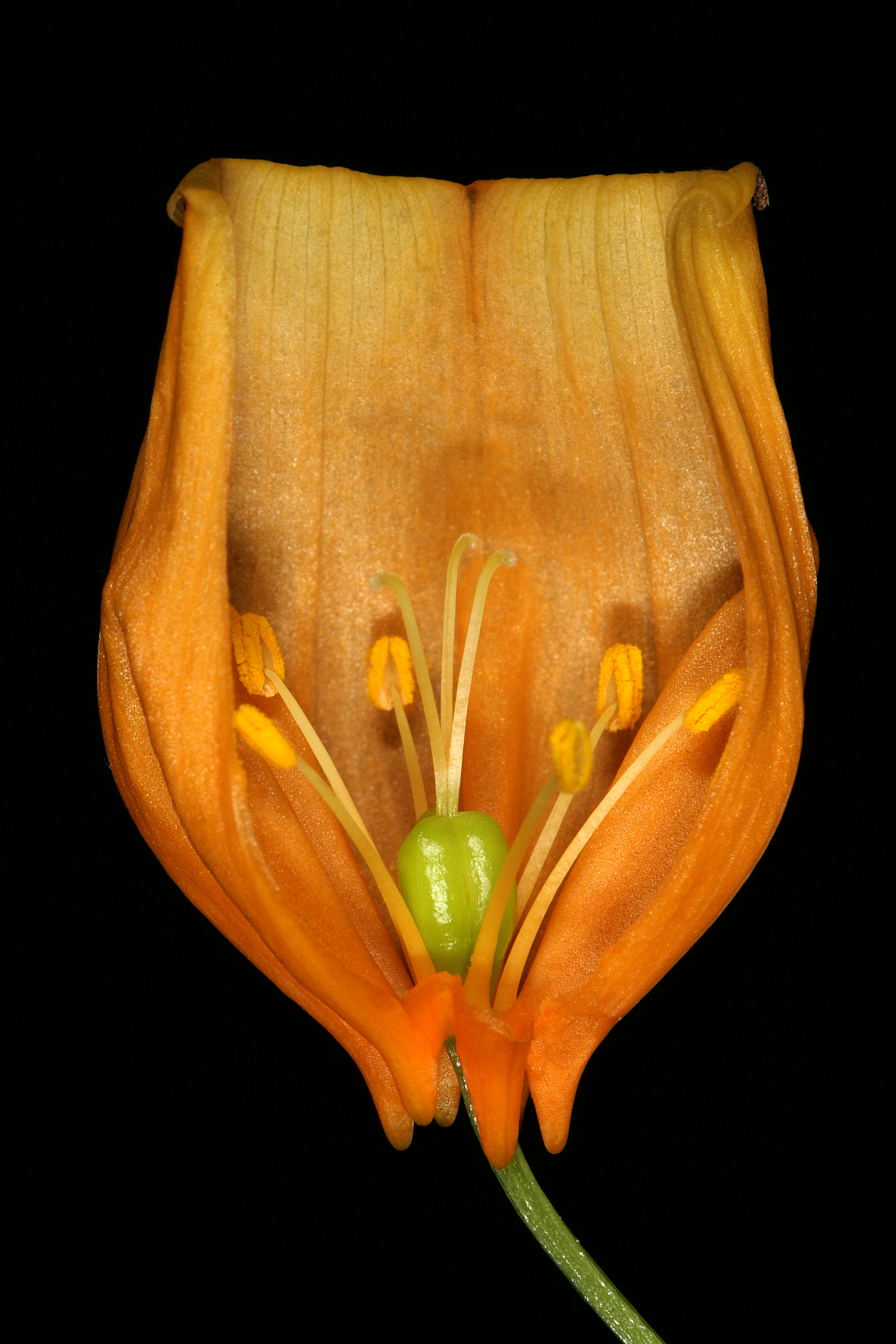
Single flower dissected to show gynoecium and androecium.

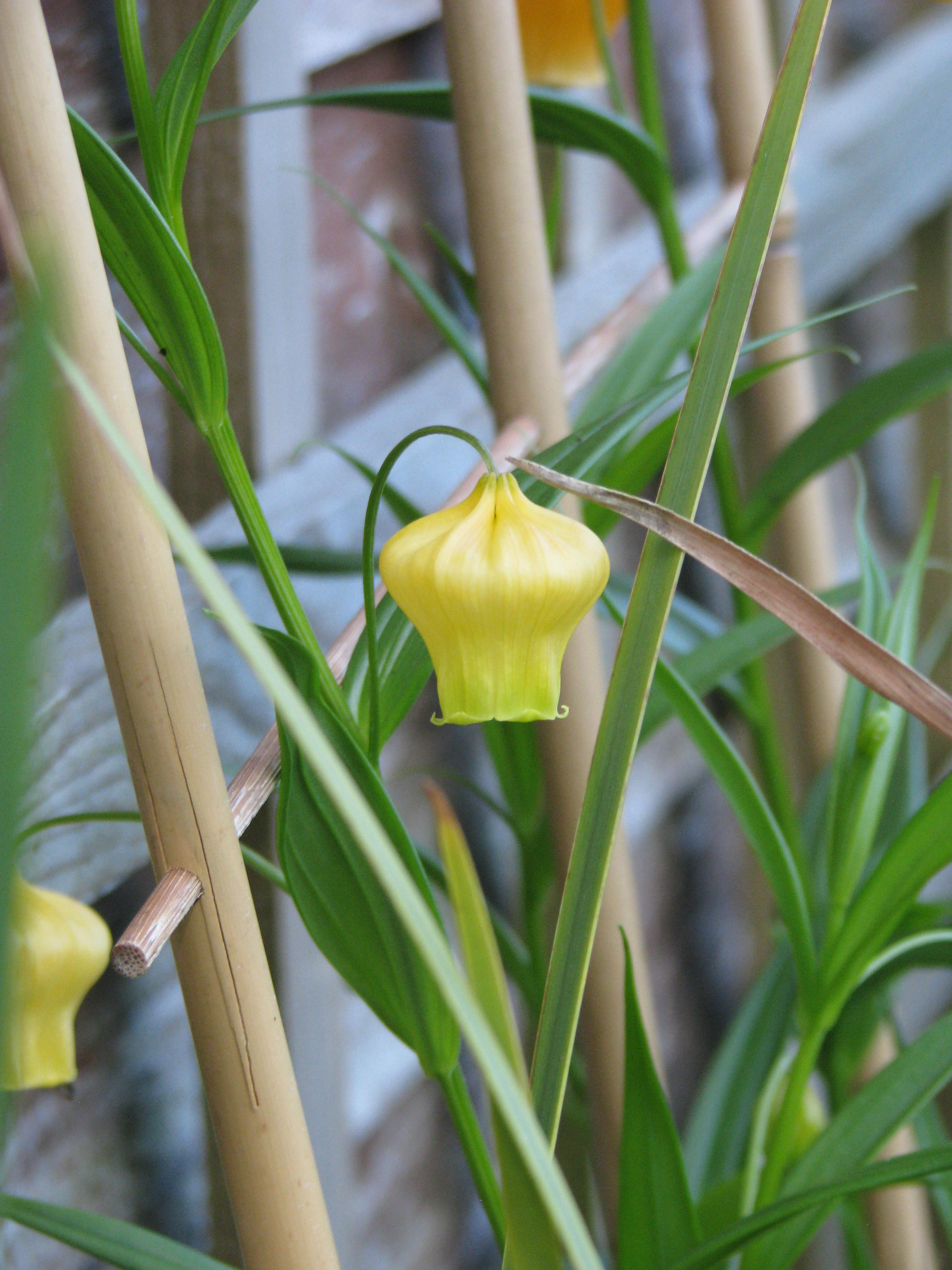
Yellow-flowered form of plant: cultivated specimen trained on small bamboo trellis to support lax growth.
