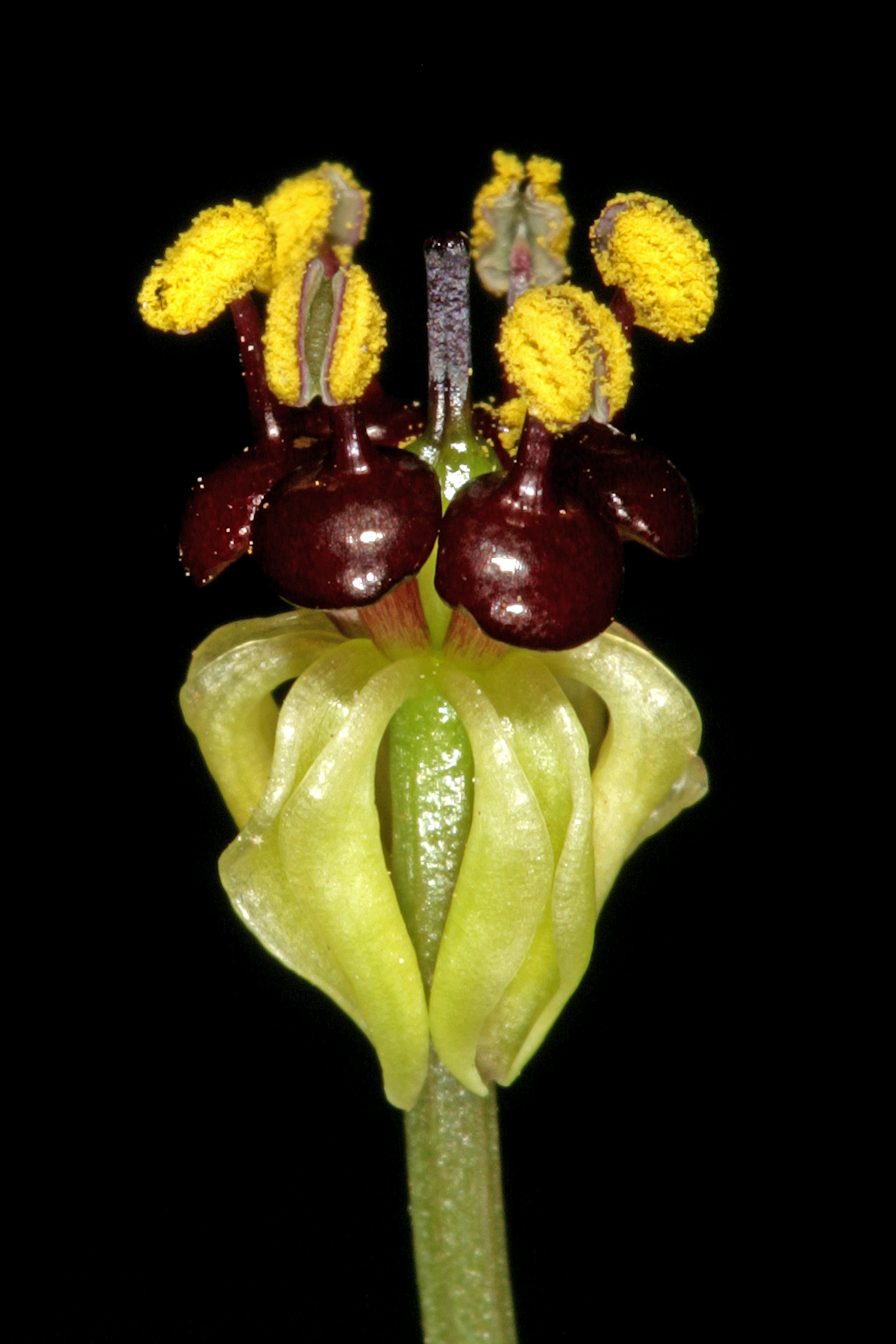
- Flower of Camptorrhiza strumosa, photographed in South Africa

Scientific classification
- Kingdom: Plantae
- Clade: Embryophytes
- Clade: Tracheophytes
- Clade: Spermatophytes
- Clade: Angiosperms
- Clade: Monocots
- Order: Liliales
- Family: Colchicaceae
- Genus: Camptorrhiza; Hutch.
- Species: C. strumosa

Binomial name
- Camptorrhiza strumosa (Baker) Oberm.

Synonyms
- Genus synonyms: Iphigeniopsis Buxb.; Species synonyms: Iphigenia guineensis Baker; Melanthium guineense Welw. ex Baker; Iphigenia strumosa Baker; Iphigenia junodii Schinz; Iphigenia schlechteri Engl.; Iphigenia flexuosa Baker; Iphigenia dinteri Dammer ex Schinz; Camptorrhiza schlechteri (Engl.) E.Phillips; Iphigeniopsis flexuosa (Baker) Buxb.; Iphigeniopsis junodii (Schinz) Buxb.; Iphigeniopsis schlechteri (Engl.) Buxb.; Iphigeniopsis strumosa (Baker) Buxb.; Camptorrhiza flexuosa (Baker) Sterling; Camptorrhiza junodii (Schinz) Sterling

= Camptorrhiza =

Genus of flowering plants

Camptorrhiza is a monotypic genus of plants in the family Colchicaceae. Its sole species, Camptorrhiza strumosa, is native to Angola, Botswana, Mozambique, Namibia, South Africa, Zambia, and Zimbabwe.
