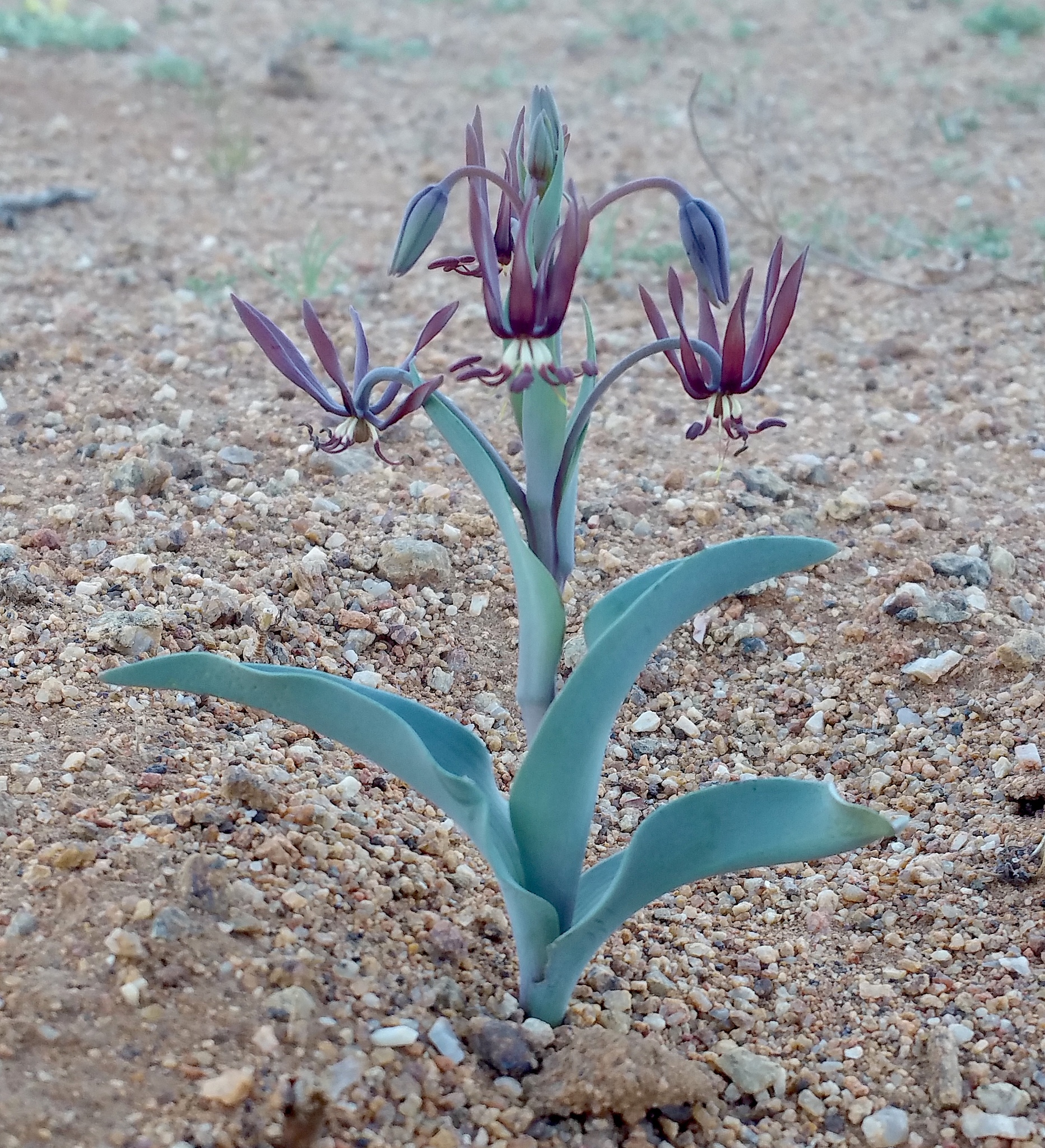
- Ornithoglossum vulgare

Scientific classification
- Kingdom: Plantae
- Clade: Tracheophytes
- Clade: Angiosperms
- Clade: Monocots
- Order: Liliales
- Family: Colchicaceae
- Genus: Ornithoglossum; Salisb.

Species
- See text

Synonyms
- Lichtensteinia Willd.; Cymation Spreng.; Cymatium Spreng.

= Ornithoglossum =

Genus of flowering plants

Ornithoglossum is a genus of plants native to southern Africa, some of which are widely cultivated as ornamentals. Nine species are currently recognized, as of April 2014:

- Ornithoglossum calcicola K.Krause & Dinter - Namibia
- Ornithoglossum dinteri K.Krause - Namibia, South Africa
- Ornithoglossum gracile B.Nord. - Cape Province
- Ornithoglossum parviflorum B.Nord. - Namibia, Cape Province
- Ornithoglossum pulchrum Snijman, B.Nord. & Mannh. - Namibia
- Ornithoglossum undulatum Sweet - Namibia, Cape Province
- Ornithoglossum viride (L.f.) Dryand. ex W.T.Aiton - Cape Province
- Ornithoglossum vulgare B.Nord. - Tanzania, Malawi, Mozambique, Zambia, Zimbabwe, Botswana, Namibia, South Africa
- Ornithoglossum zeyheri (Baker) B.Nord. - Cape Province
