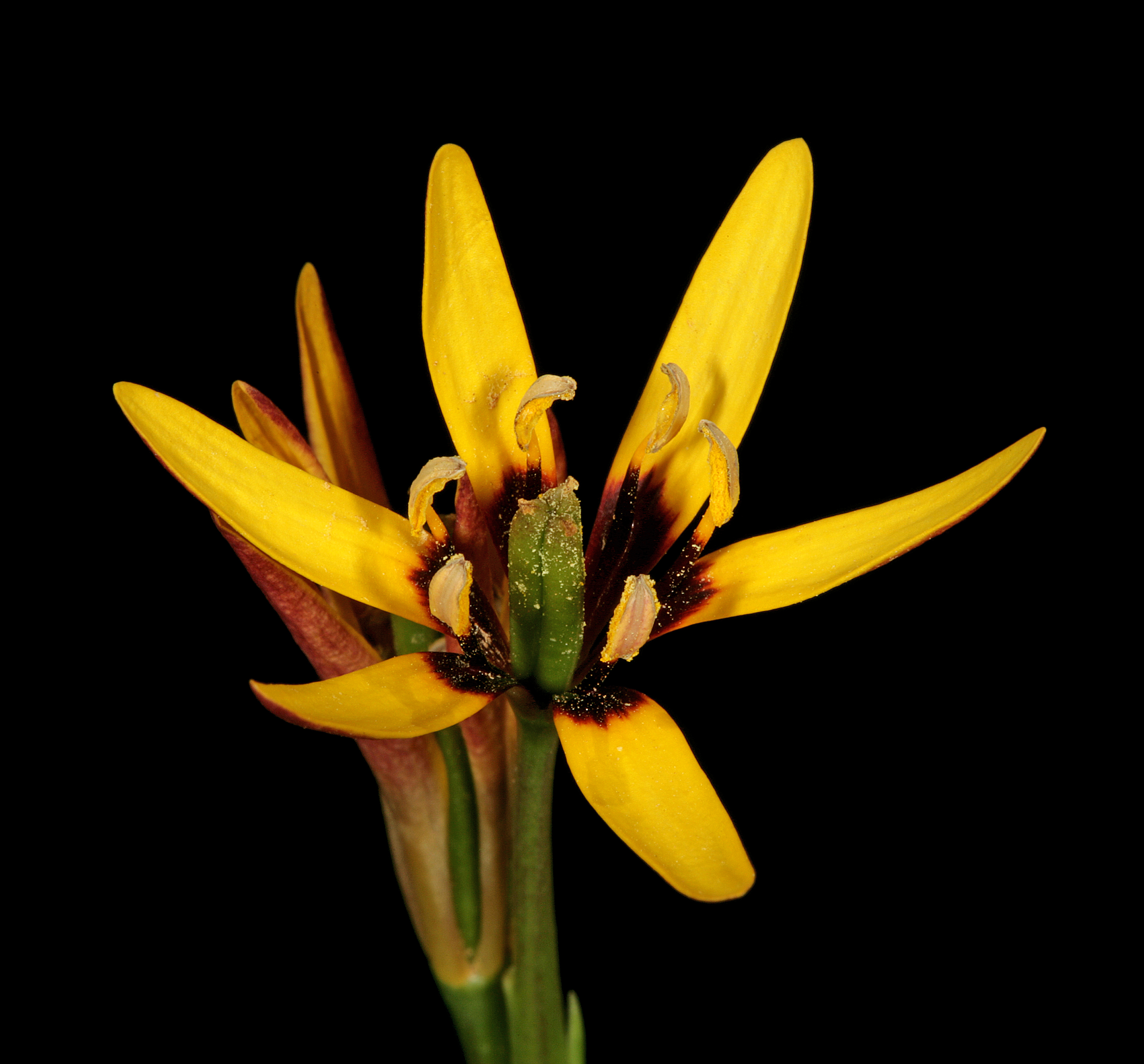
- Baeometra uniflora, flower; Paarlberg Nature Reserve,Paarl, South Africa

Scientific classification
- Kingdom: Plantae
- Clade: Tracheophytes
- Clade: Angiosperms
- Clade: Monocots
- Order: Liliales
- Family: Colchicaceae
- Genus: Baeometra; Salisb. ex Endl.
- Species: B. uniflora

Binomial name
- Baeometra uniflora (Jacq.) G.J.Lewis

Synonyms
- Melanthium uniflorum Jacq.; Kolbea uniflora (Jacq.) Harv.; Melanthium aethiopicum Desr.; Baeometra columellaris Salisb.; Melanthium flavum Sm. in A.Rees; Epionix flava Raf.; Epionix rubra Raf.; Baeometra breyniana Baill.

= Baeometra =

Genus of flowering plants

Baeometra is a genus in the family Colchicaceae containing a single species, Baeometra uniflora. It is native to South Africa, where it is commonly called beetle lily due to the dark markings on the tepals.

== History ==
The genus was erected when the British botanist Richard Salisbury described the species "Baeometra columellaris" in 1812, although the plant had already been discovered, described and painted in 1793 by the Austrian botanist Nikolaus Joseph von Jacquin under the name Melanthium uniflorum. The correct name for the species was thus settled in 1941 by the South African botanist Gwendolyn Lewis to be Baeometra uniflora (Salisb.) G.J.Lewis. The epithet means "single-flowered", which is contradicted by the fact that the stem usually bears at least two yellowish flowers.

The species is related to the genus Wurmbea, which is present in southern Africa and Australia, and is known to be a poisonous plant containing the alkaloid colchicine.

== Description ==
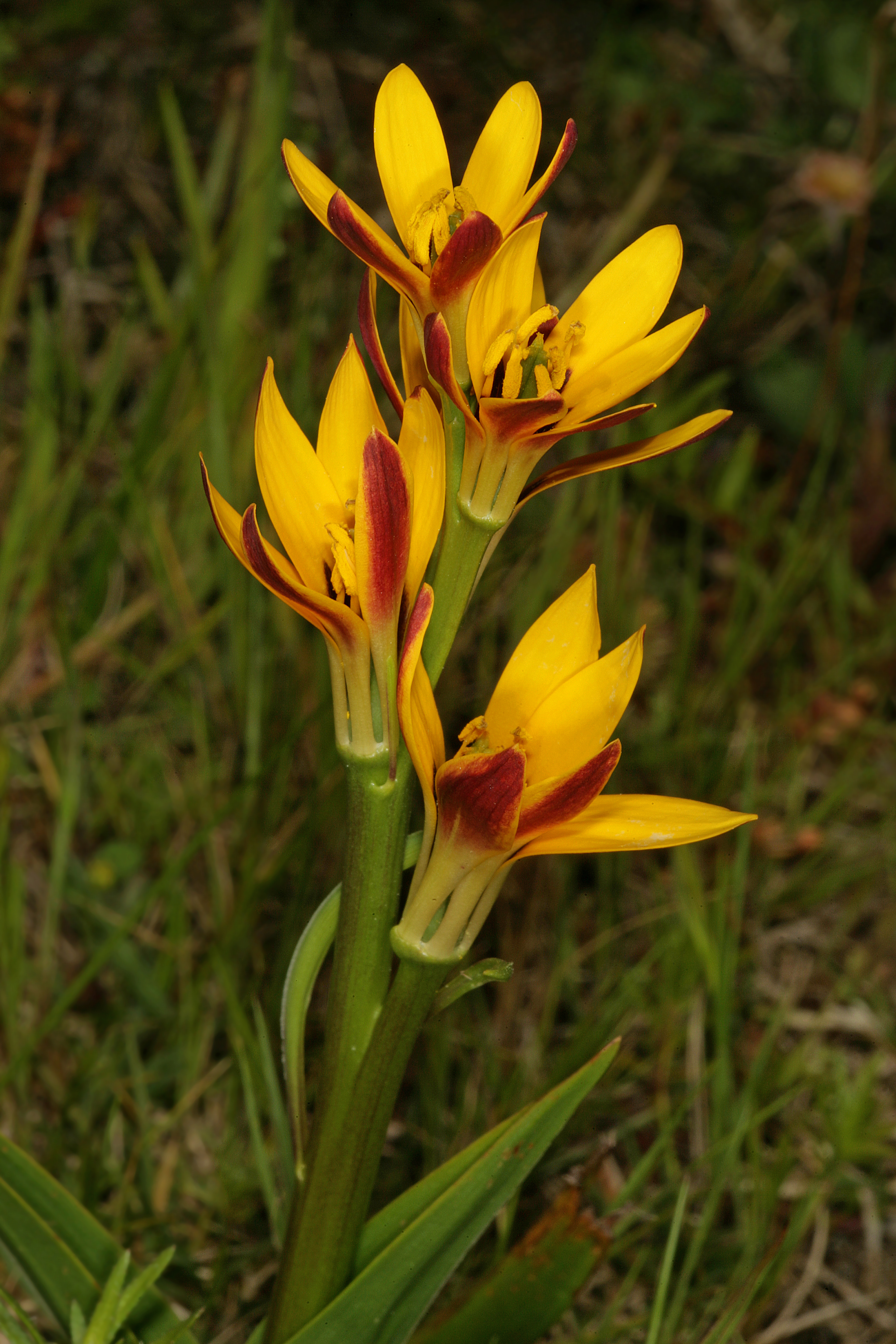
Beetle lily from Kleinmond, South Africa

The beetle lily is a geophyte that grows up to 30 cm (12 in) tall. The lance-shaped leaves grow in a spiral shape. There are between five and eight of them, clasping the base of the stem. The largest is 10–30 cm (3.9–11.8 in) long, while the uppermost leaf almost entirely sheaths the stem. The corm is a flattened, ovoid shape and is covered in dark brown, leathery layers. It has a crescent-shaped ridge at the base.

Bright orange or yellow unscented flowers are present between August and October. They have a firm texture and lack nectar. Each plant has between one and five flowers growing in a funnel of successively smaller flowers. The lower flowers are on short pedicles. Each flower has a distinctive dark eye at the center. The stamens have maroon filaments and yellow anthers. The red-flushed undersides of the petals are visible during cooler weather as the flowers only open when it is warm. Each flower lasts only a few days, the tepals falling off to make space for the enlarging cylindrical, 3-lobed ovary as the fruits start to develop.

The woody fruits (3–5 cm (1.2–2.0 in) long) mature slowly, usually only shedding seeds in late summer. They split where the lobes join on the top quarter of the fruit. The reddish brown seeds (1–1.5 mm (0.039–0.059 in) in diameter) have a subglobose shape, but become angled by the pressure that is exerted on them. They are slowly released as the stalks the fruits are borne on are shaken by the wind.

== Distribution and habitat ==
The beetle lily is endemic to the southwestern cape of South Africa, where it is found between Malmesbury and Riversdale, where it is common in seasonally wet areas as well as lightly disturbed regions, such as road verges. It is also found on rocky sandstone and granite slopes.

This species has also been introduced to Australia, where it is considered to be an invasive and unwanted addition to the local flora.

== Ecology ==
This species is insect pollinated. Like several other species in the region, the dark center attracts money beetles, such as Peritrichia abdominalis, as it resembles a mate. The plant does, however, also seem to be able to self-fertilise as all flowers produce a full set of fertile seeds.
