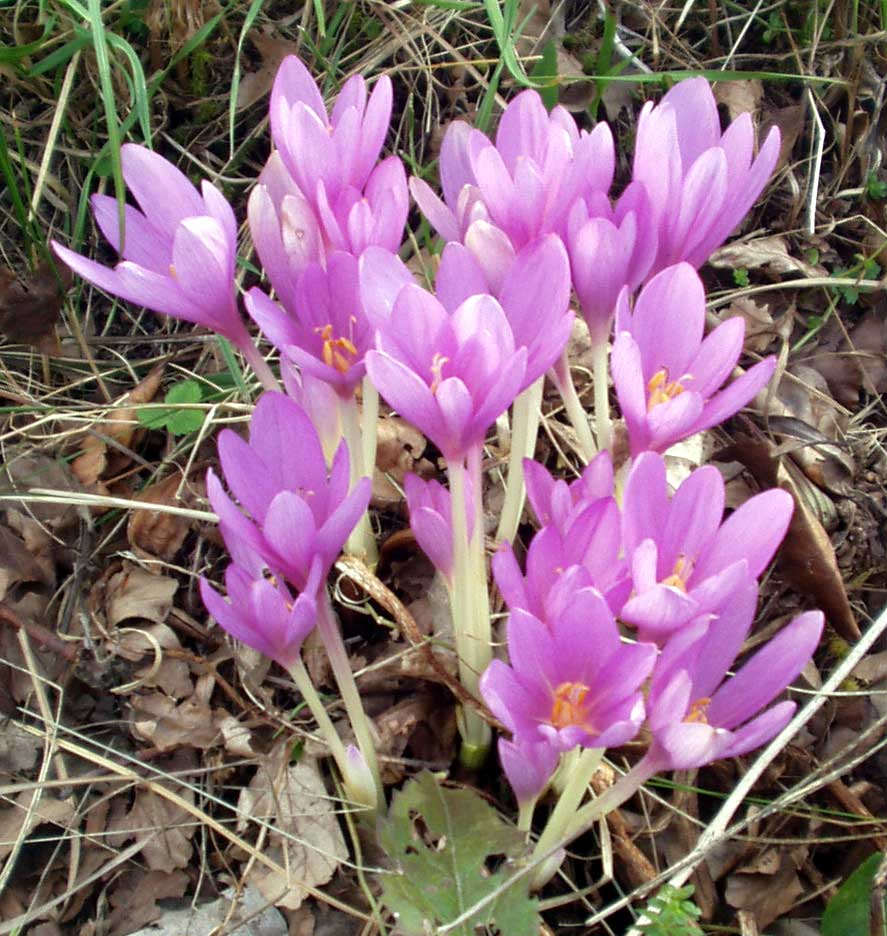
- Colchicum autumnale

Scientific classification
- Kingdom: Plantae
- Clade: Embryophytes
- Clade: Tracheophytes
- Clade: Spermatophytes
- Clade: Angiosperms
- Clade: Monocots
- Order: Liliales
- Family: Colchicaceae; DC.

Genera
- See text

= Colchicaceae =

Family of monocot flowering plants

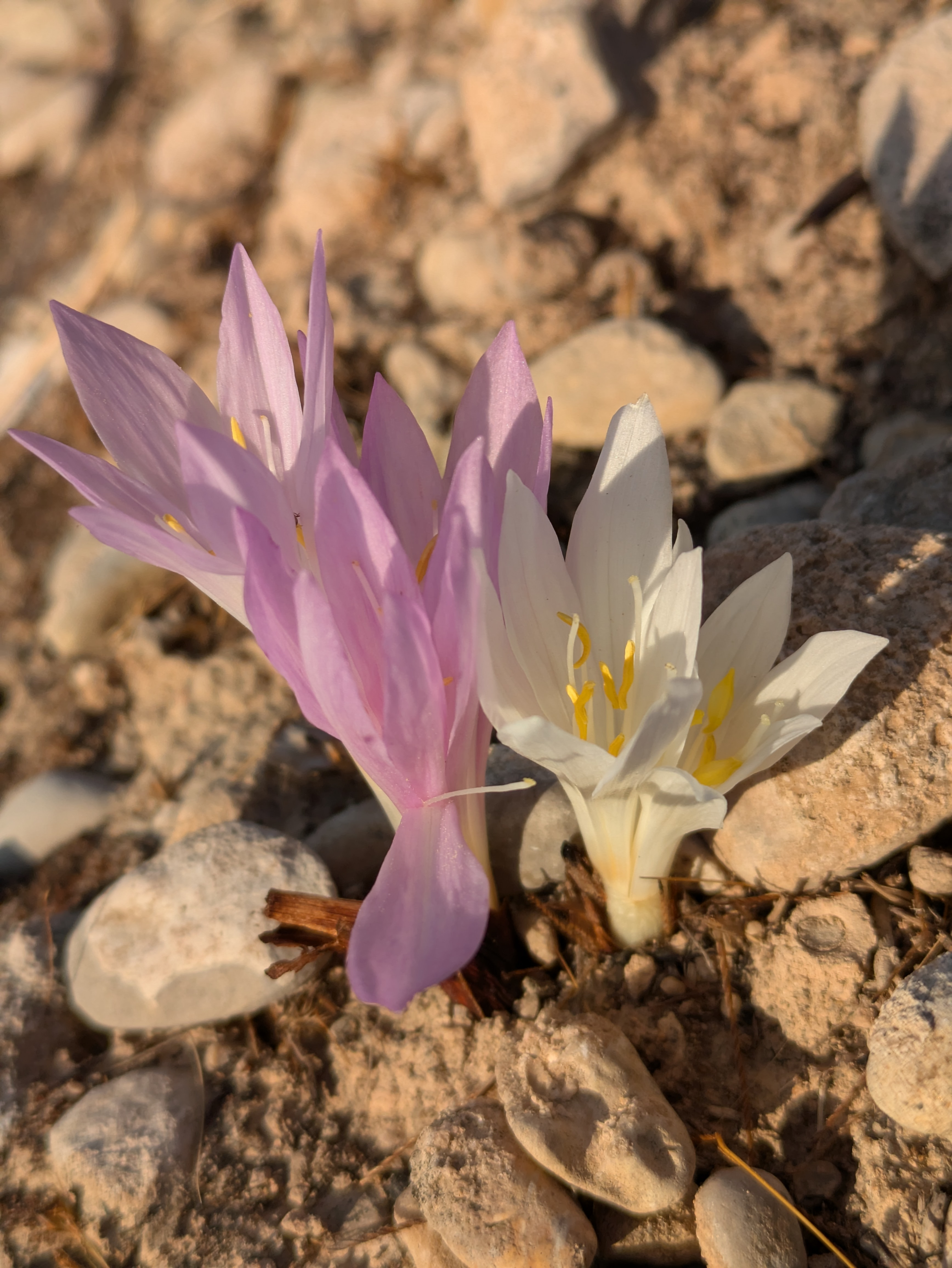
Colchicum persicum in Behbahan, Iran

Colchicaceae is a family of flowering plants that includes 15 genera with a total of about 285 known species according to Christenhusz and Byng in 2016.

The family is characterized by the presence of colchicine.

== Taxonomy ==
The APG III system, of 2009 (unchanged from the APG systems, of 1998 and 2003), recognizes this family and places it in the order Liliales, in the clade monocots. It is a group of herbaceous perennials with rhizomes or corms.

The Dahlgren system and the Thorne system (1992) also recognized this family, and placed it in order Liliales in superorder Lilianae in subclass Liliidae (monocotyledons) of class Magnoliopsida (angiosperms).

=== Genera ===
As of June 2026, Plants of the World Online accepted the following genera, arranged below as in the 2007 phylogenetic classification of Vinnersten and Manning:

- tribe Burchardieae
  - Burchardia R.Br.
- tribe Uvularieae
  - Disporum Salisb. (excluding the North American species to the genus Prosartes D.Don, now in the family Liliaceae, Liliales)
  - Uvularia L.
- tribe Tripladenieae
  - Kuntheria Conran & Clifford
  - Schelhammera R.Br.
  - Tripladenia D.Don
- tribe Iphigenieae
  - Camptorrhiza Hutch.
  - Iphigenia Kunth
- tribe Anguillarieae
  - Baeometra Salisb. ex Endl.
  - Wurmbea Thunb. (including Neodregea C.H.Wright and Onixotis Raf.)
- tribe Colchiceae
  - Colchicum L. (including Androcymbium Willd., Bulbocodium L. and Merendera Ramond)
  - Gloriosa L. (including Littonia Hook.)
  - Hexacyrtis Dinter
  - Ornithoglossum Salisb.
  - Sandersonia Hook.

- Colchicaceae
  - Burchardieae
    Burchardia
  - - Uvularieae
      - Disporum
      - Uvularia
    - - Tripladenieae
        - Tripladenia
        - - Schelhammera
          - Kuntheria
      - - - Iphigenieae
            - Camptorrhiza
            - Iphigenia
          - Anguillarieae
            - Baeometra
            - Wurmbea
        - Colchiceae
          - Gloriosa
          - - - Sandersonia
              - Ornithoglossum
            - - Hexacyrtis
              - Colchicum

The genus Petermannia F.Muell. is excluded from this family and placed in its own family Petermanniaceae, Liliales. The former controversy regarding the inclusion of Androcymbium in Colchicum has now been resolved in favor of the 2007 classification of Manning et al. who included Androcymbium in Colchicum. This is supported by molecular phylogenetic studies with dense species sampling (i.e. 41 species previously placed in Androcymbium and 96 species of Colchicum) that showed that the type species of Androcymbium, A. melanthioides (Colchicum melanthioides), is more closely related to species of Colchicum than it is to many species traditionally placed in Androcymbium.

Subsequently, Nguyen et al.(2013) proposed reclassifying the family on the basis of subfamilies:

- Subfamily Uvularioideae (distribution: Eastern Asia and North America)
  - Tribe Uvularieae (Disporum, Uvularia)
- Subfamily Wurmbeoideae (distribution: Australia, Africa, Europe, central and tropical Asia)
  - Tribe Burchardieae (Burchardia)
  - Tribe Tripladenieae (Tripladenia, Schelhammera, Kuntheria)
  - Tribe Iphigenieae (Iphigenia, Camptorrhiza)
  - Tribe Angullarieae (Wurmbea, Onixotis, Neodregea, Baeometra)
  - Tribe Colchiceae (Gloriosa (including Littonia), Colchicum (including Merendera, Bulbocodium, and probably Androcymbium), Hexacyrtis, Ornithoglossum, Sandersonia

== Gallery ==
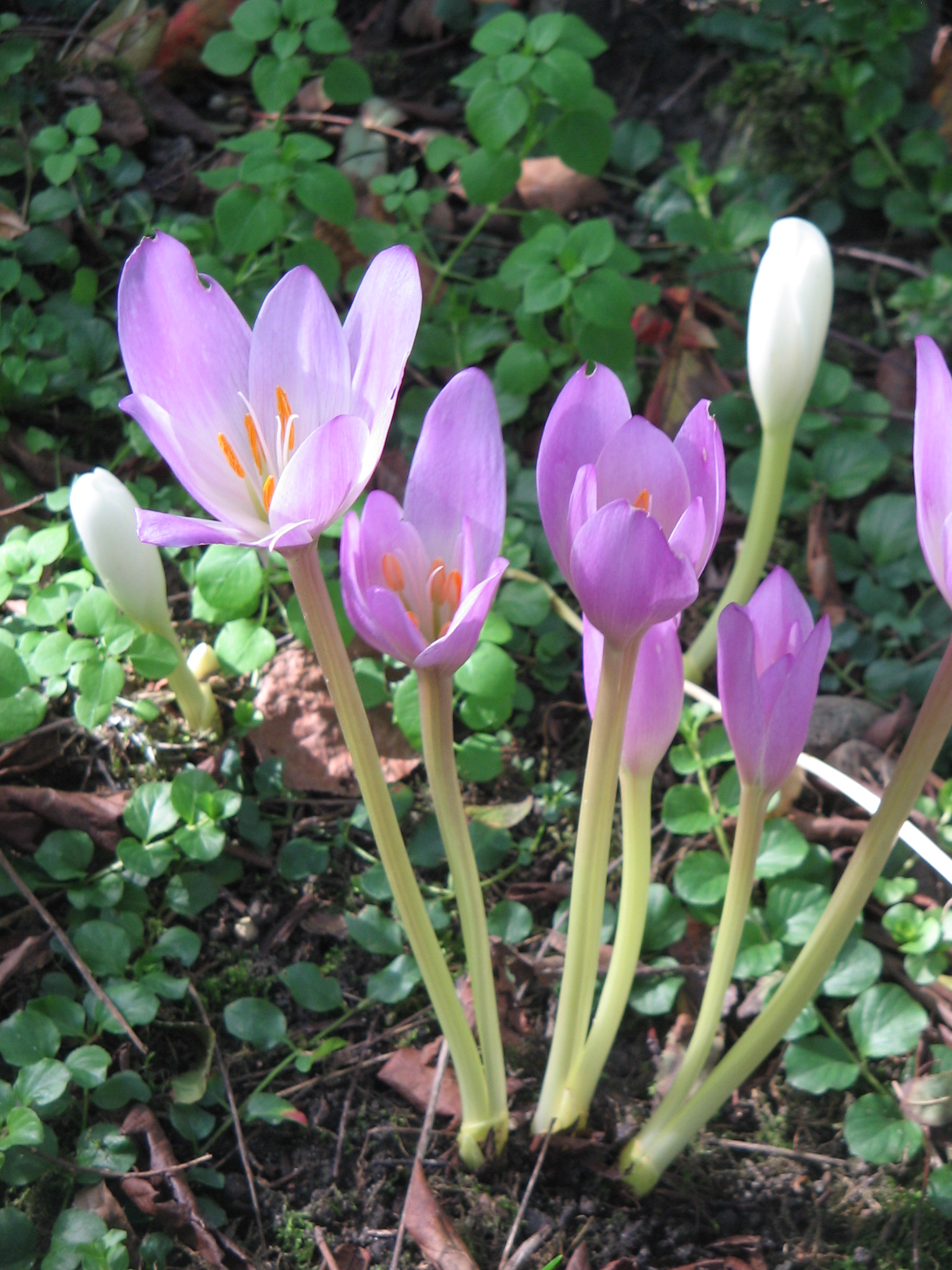
Colchicum speciosum

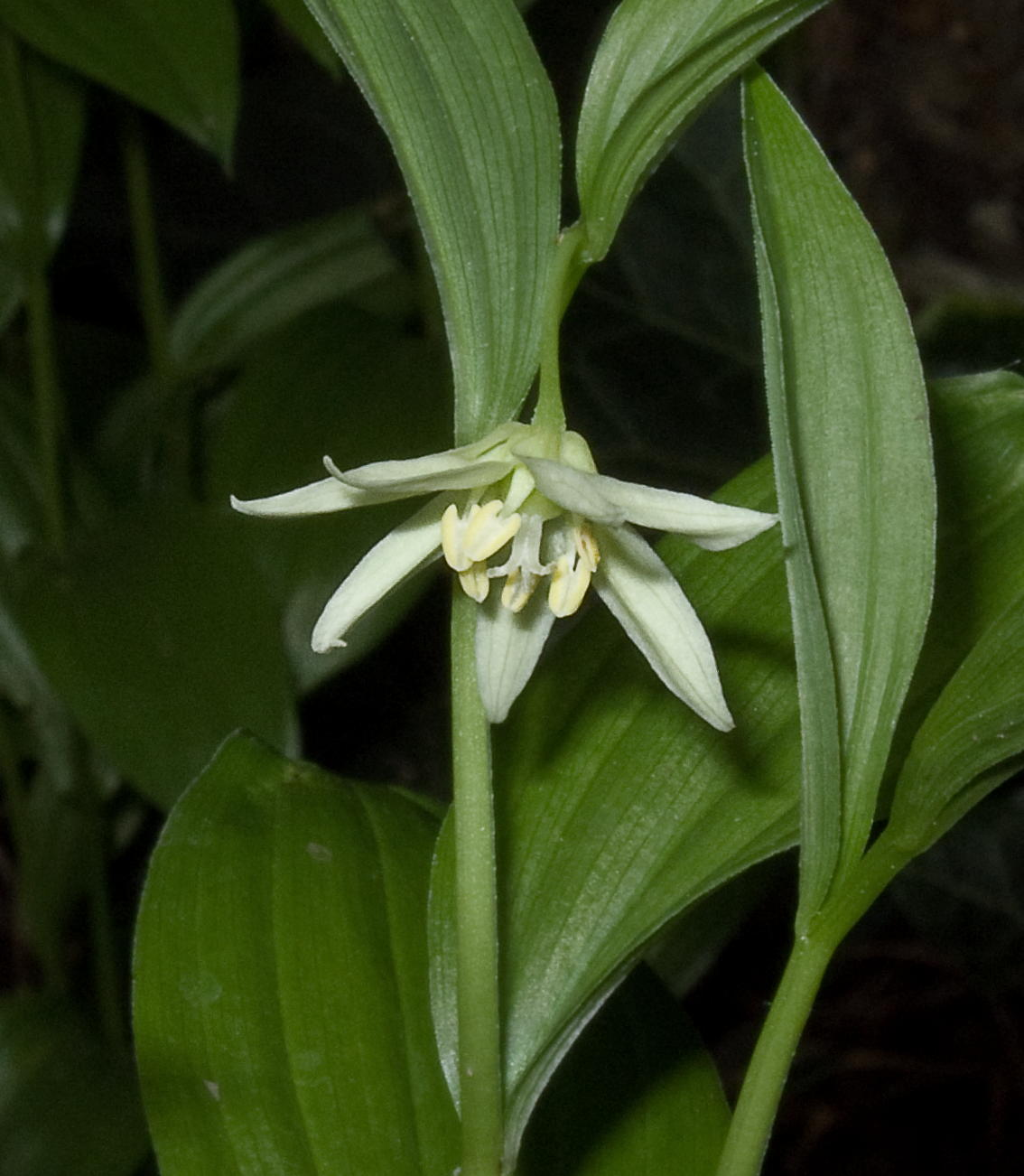
Disporum viridescens

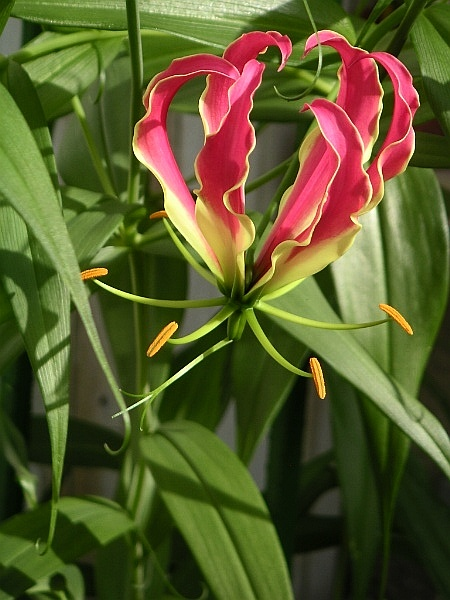
Gloriosa superba

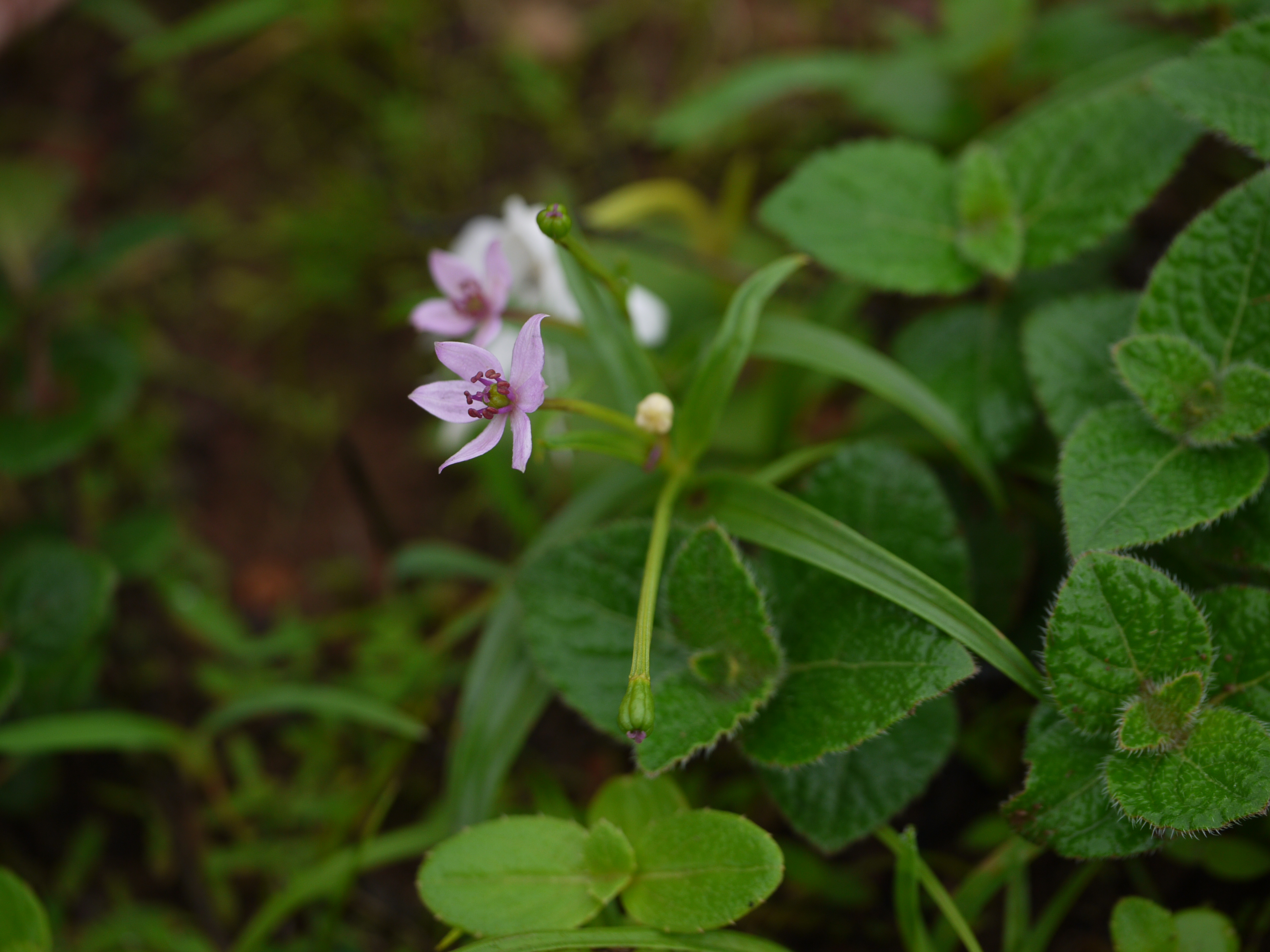
Iphigenia stellata

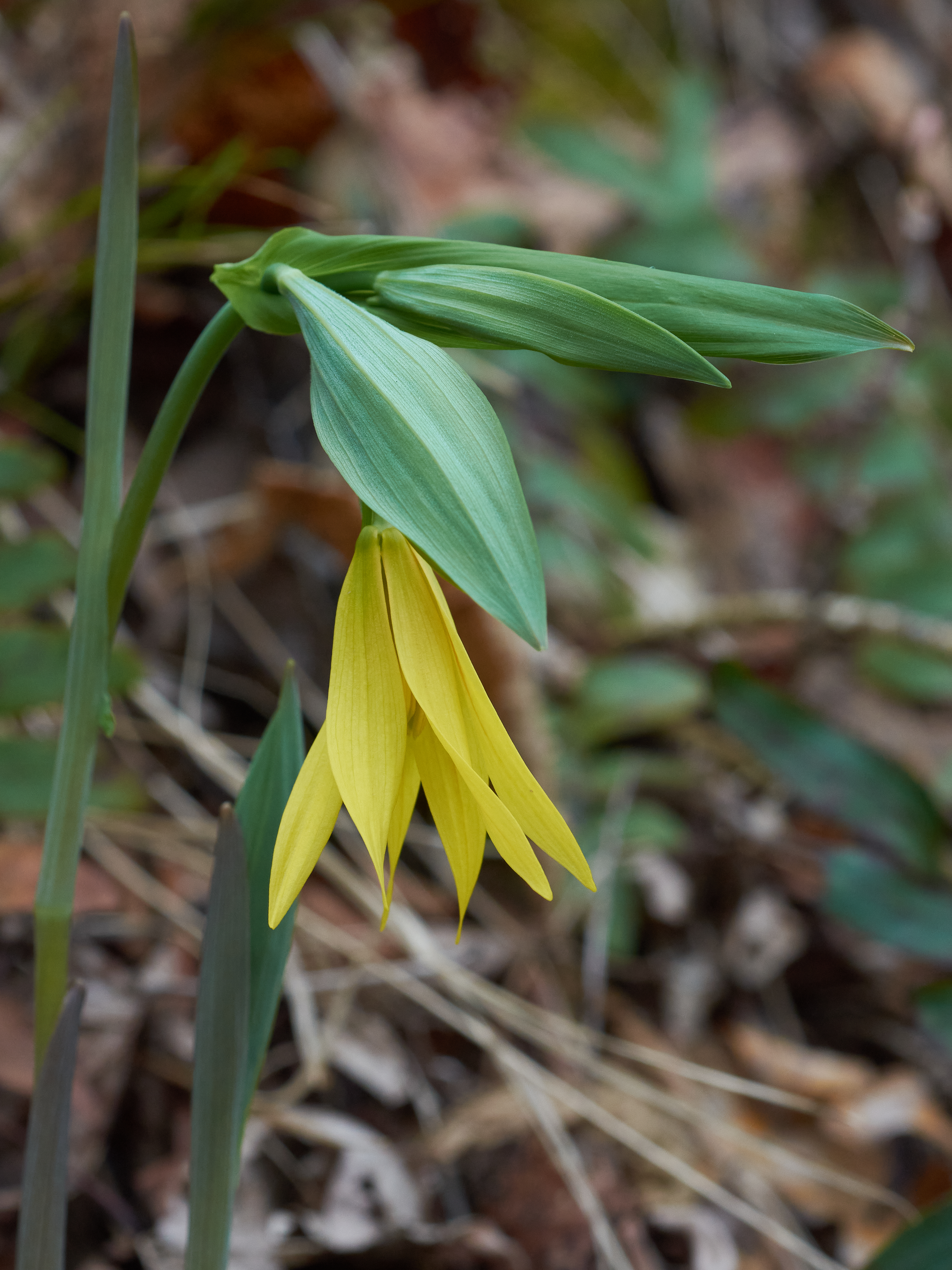
Uvularia grandiflora

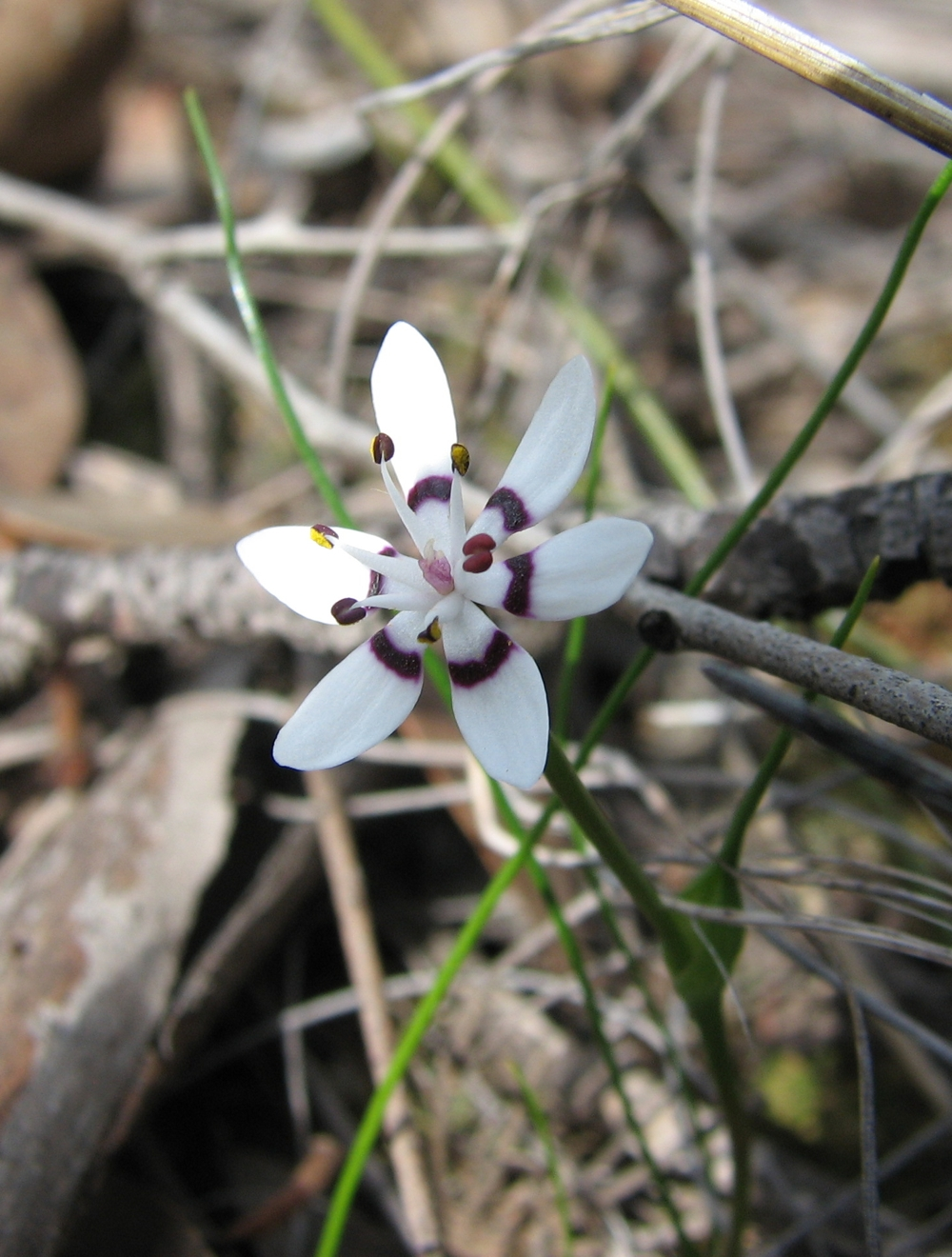
Wurmbea dioica

== Bibliography ==
- Nguyen, Thi P. A.; Kim, Jung Sung; Kim, Joo-Hwan (July 2013). "Molecular phylogenetic relationships and implications for the circumscription of Colchicaceae (Liliales)". Botanical Journal of the Linnean Society. 172 (3): 255–269. doi:10.1111/boj.12037.
- Vinnersten, A.; Reeves, G. (1 October 2003). "Phylogenetic relationships within Colchicaceae". American Journal of Botany. 90 (10): 1455–1462. doi:10.3732/ajb.90.10.1455. PMID 21659097.
- Vinnersten, Annika; Manning, John (2007). "A New Classification of Colchicaceae". Taxon. 56 (1): 171–178. Bibcode:2007Taxon..56..171V. doi:10.2307/25065748. ISSN 0040-0262. JSTOR 25065748.
- Vinnersten, Annika; Larsson, Sonny (December 2010). "Colchicine is still a chemical marker for the expanded Colchicaceae". Biochemical Systematics and Ecology. 38 (6): 1193–1198. Bibcode:2010BioSE..38.1193V. doi:10.1016/j.bse.2010.12.004.
