= Trithuria bibracteata =

Scientific classification
- Kingdom: Plantae
- Clade: Tracheophytes
- Clade: Angiosperms
- Order: Nymphaeales
- Family: Hydatellaceae
- Genus: Trithuria
- Section: Trithuria sect. Trithuria
- Species: T. bibracteata

Binomial name
- Trithuria bibracteata Stapf ex D.A.Cooke
- Trithuria bibracteata is endemic to Western Australia

Species of aquatic plant

Trithuria bibracteata is a species of aquatic plant in the family Hydatellaceae endemic to Western Australia.

== Description ==
=== Vegetative characteristics ===
Trithuria bibracteata is a small, annual, aquatic herb with simple, linear, 5-20 mm long, and 0.4 mm wide leaves. The red plants are 1 cm wide, and max. 2 cm high. The short stem bears max. 2 mm long hairs.

=== Generative characteristics ===
It is monoecious, and the reproductive units ("flowers") are bisexual. The reproductive units are sessile, or pedunculate. The reproductive unit consists of two lanceolate, 2-3 mm long, and 1.2 mm wide involucral bracts, 1-2 stamens, and 6-10 carpels. The dehiscent fruit bears 0.4-0.6 mm long, desiccation-tolerant, black to brown, ellipsoid to ovoid seeds, which require light to germinate. Flowering occurs from September to November.

== Distribution ==
It occurs in the Southwest region of the state Western Australia.

== Taxonomy ==
It was described in 1983 as Trithuria bibracteata Stapf ex D.A.Cooke by David Alan Cooke based on previous work by Otto Stapf. The type specimen was collected by R. D. Royce in Boyanup, Western Australia in 1947. It is placed in Trithuria sect. Trithuria.

== Etymology ==
The specific epithet bibracteata is derived from the prefix bi- meaning two, and -bracteata meaning "with bracts". The reproductive units have two bracts.

== Conservation ==
It is not threatened.

== Ecology ==
=== Habitat ===
It occurs in clay and mud along stream edges, ephemeral pools, and swamps. It inhabits winter-wet habitats, which dry in the Australian summer from December to February. It can occur sympatrically with Trithuria occidentalis.

=== Seed dispersal ===
The desiccation-tolerant seeds may be dispersed by water birds.
