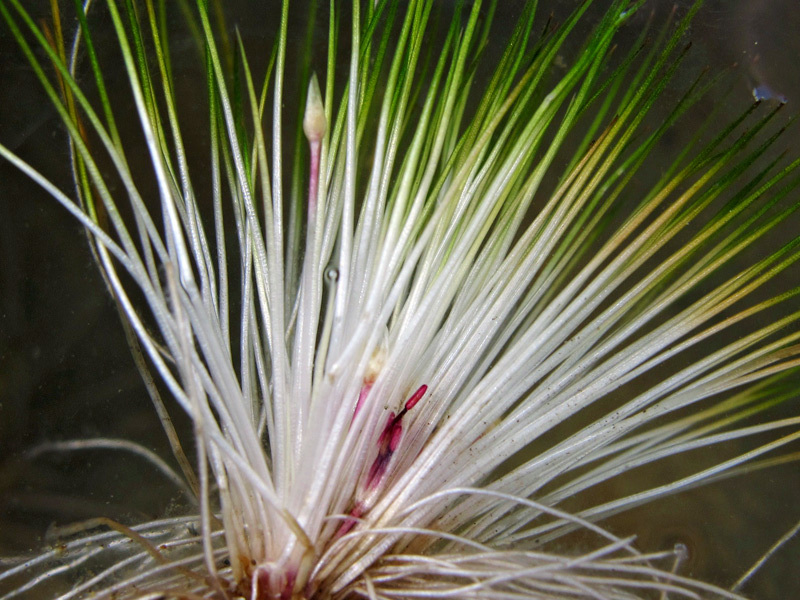
- Trithuria inconspicua growing in fine silica sand

Conservation status
- Nationally Critical (NZ TCS)

Scientific classification
- Kingdom: Plantae
- Clade: Embryophytes
- Clade: Tracheophytes
- Clade: Spermatophytes
- Clade: Angiosperms
- Order: Nymphaeales
- Family: Hydatellaceae
- Genus: Trithuria
- Section: Trithuria sect. Hydatella
- Species: T. inconspicua

Binomial name
- Trithuria inconspicua Cheeseman, 1906

Subspecies
- Trithuria inconspicua subsp. brevistyla K.A.Ford; Trithuria inconspicua subsp. inconspicua
- Distribution of Trithuria inconspicua

Synonyms
- Hydatella inconspicua (Cheeseman) Cheeseman

= Trithuria inconspicua =

Species of aquatic plant

Trithuria inconspicua is a small aquatic herb of the family Hydatellaceae that is only found in New Zealand.

== Description ==
T. inconspicua partially buried under sediment. Photo by Jeremy Rolfe

=== Vegetative characteristics ===
Trithuria inconspicua is a small, 15–55 mm tall, aquatic, perennial, rhizomatous herb with adventitious roots and glabrous, linear-filiform, 15–55 mm long, and 0.25–0.4 mm wide leaves. The rhizome is up to 2 cm long, and up to 3 mm wide.

=== Generative characteristics ===
It can be seen as either a monoicous, or in part as an exclusively female species. It can possess either bisexual, or unisexual reproductive units ("flowers"). Female plants are more frequent, although male and bisexual individuals also occur. The male flowers consist of bright red 10 mm long filaments, whilst the female flowers are yellow-brown and contain 5-10 styles bunched at the apex.

== Cytology ==
The chloroplast genome is 165389 bp long.

== Taxonomy ==
It was published by Thomas Frederick Cheeseman in 1906. The lectotype specimen was collected by H. Carse in Lake Ngatu, New Zealand on 1 January 1902. It is placed in Trithuria sect. Hydatella.
It is divided into two subspecies, namely the autonymous subspecies Trithuria inconspicua subsp. inconspicua, which is found in coastal dune lakes in the North of North Island, New Zealand, and Trithuria inconspicua subsp. brevistyla K.A.Ford described in 2019, which is found in glacial lakes in the South of South Island, New Zealand.

== Etymology ==
The specific epithet inconspicua means inconspicuous, not easily visible.

== The first flowering plant? ==
Based on molecular data from a single plastid gene (rbcL)T. inconspicua was originally believed to a monocot. However, a more recent study using multiple genetic loci, supported by a subsequent re-evaluation of morphological characteristics, now places T. inconspicua as a sister group with the water lilies (Nymphaeales). This new placement of T. inconspicua means only a single lineage of flowering plant is thought to be older, that being the woody New Caledonian shrub Amborella trichopoda.

The predominant view that Amborella represents the oldest flowering plant was recently challenged in a study by Goremykin et al (2013), who showed that when highly variable sites were removed from the dataset, T. inconspicua was consistently identified as the oldest angiosperm lineage. This proposal has attracted criticism from Drew et al (2014), who argued that the basal placement of T. inconspicua is an artifact of the variable site filtering method used by Goremykin et al (2013). One of the main reasons why people are interested in this question is that placing T. inconspicua at the base of the angiosperm lineage would suggest the first angiosperms were soft bodied aquatic plants, rather than a woody terrestrial plants like Amborella. These competing theories have been given the light hearted monikers "wet and wild" and "dark and disturbed".

== Conservation status ==
Trithuria inconspicua is seriously threatened due to the competition by the introduced bladder wort (Utricularia gibba) as well as other fresh water weeds.

== Ecology ==
It occurs in coastal dune lakes and glacial lakes in shallow to 5–7 m deep waters. It grows in mud, sand, and gravel substrates. The plants are often partly buried within the substrate.

== Cultural significance ==
It has been chosen to be the New Zealand's Favourite Plant 2024.
