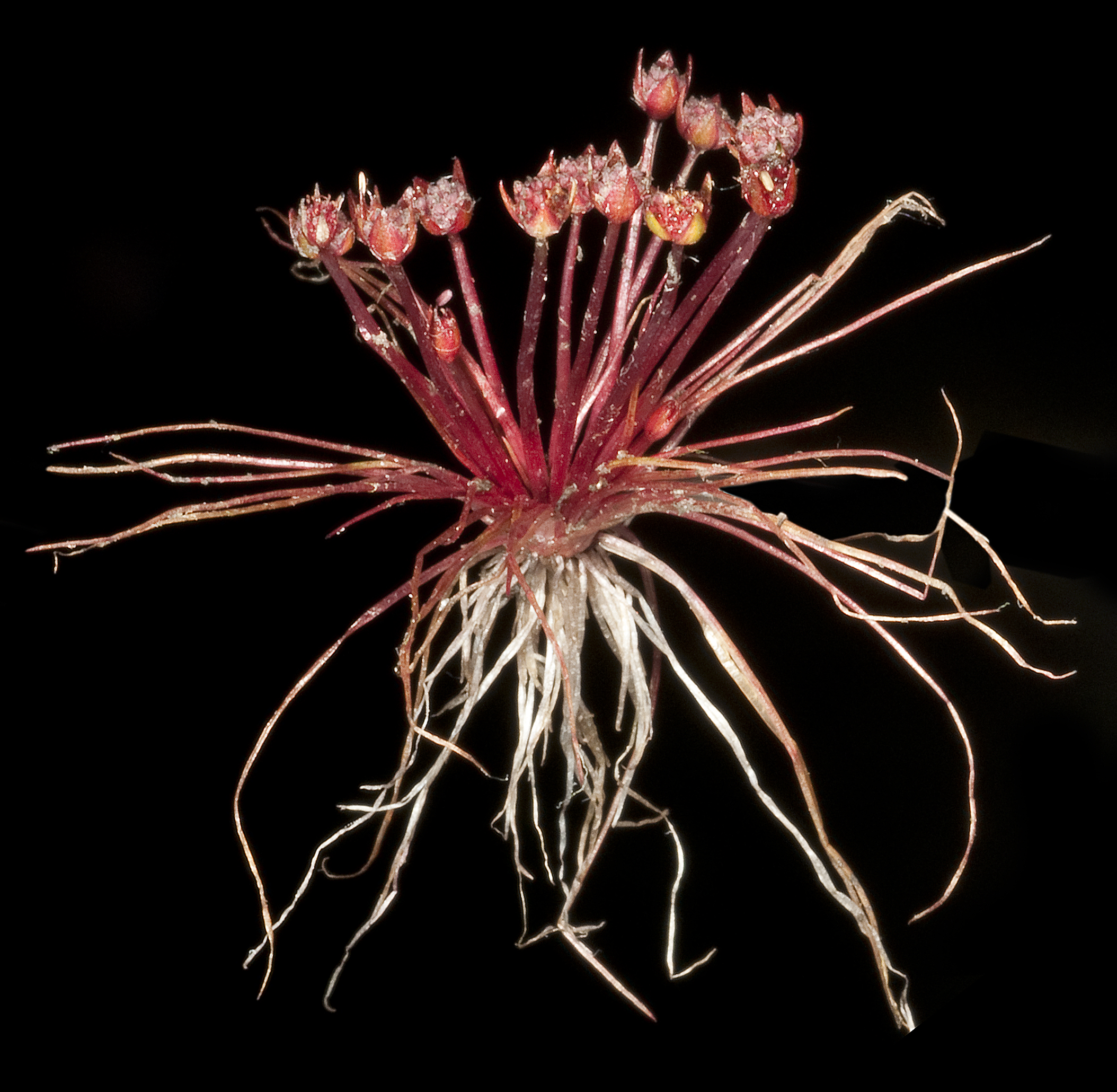
- Complete Trithuria submersa specimen

Scientific classification
- Kingdom: Plantae
- Clade: Tracheophytes
- Clade: Angiosperms
- Order: Nymphaeales
- Family: Hydatellaceae; U. Hamann
- Genus: Trithuria; Hook.f.

Type species
- Trithuria submersa Hook.f.

Species
- See here
- It is native to India, Australia, and New Zealand

Synonyms
- Hydatella Diels; Juncella F.Muell. ex Hieron.

= Trithuria =

Genus of aquatic plants

Trithuria is a genus of small ephemeral aquatic herb that represent the only members of the family Hydatellaceae found in India, Australia, and New Zealand. Almost all described species of Trithuria are found in Australia, with the exception of T. inconspicua and T. konkanensis, from New Zealand and India respectively. Until DNA sequence data and a reinterpretation of morphology proved otherwise, these plants were believed to be monocots related to the grasses (Poaceae). They are unique in being the only plants besides two members of Triuridaceae (Lacandonia schizmatica and L. braziliana) in which the stamens are centred and surrounded by the pistils; in Hydatellaceae the resulting 'flowers' may instead represent condensed inflorescences or non-flowers.

These diminutive, superficially moss-like, aquatic plants are the closest living relatives of a clade comprising two closely related water-lily families Nymphaeaceae and Cabombaceae. Together, these three families compose the order Nymphaeales in the APG III system of flowering plant classification. Trithuria (Hydatellaceae) diverged from the rest of Nymphaeales soon after Nymphaeales diverged from its sister taxon, although the crown clade evolved relatively recently, in the early Miocene (~19 Ma;). The order as a whole is the sister group of all flowering plants except Amborellales.

Trithuria exhibits a remarkable similarity to Centrolepis and species of both genera were mistaken for members of the other genus.

== Description ==
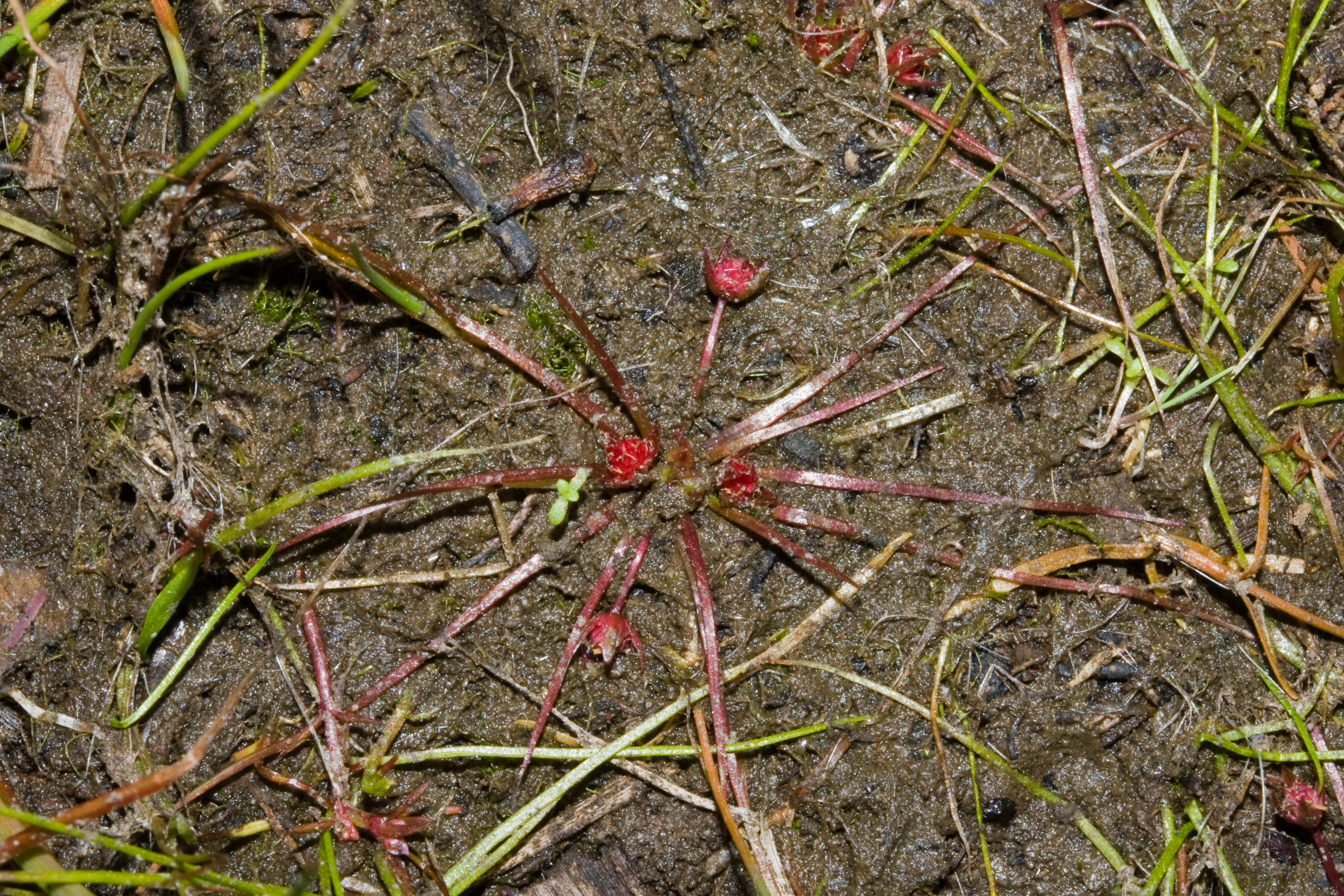
Flowering Trithuria submersa

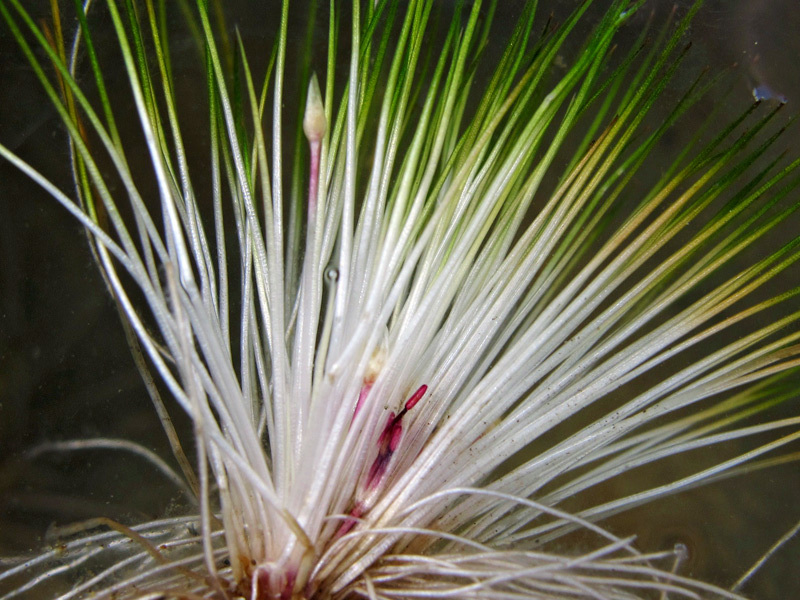
Trithuria inconspicua

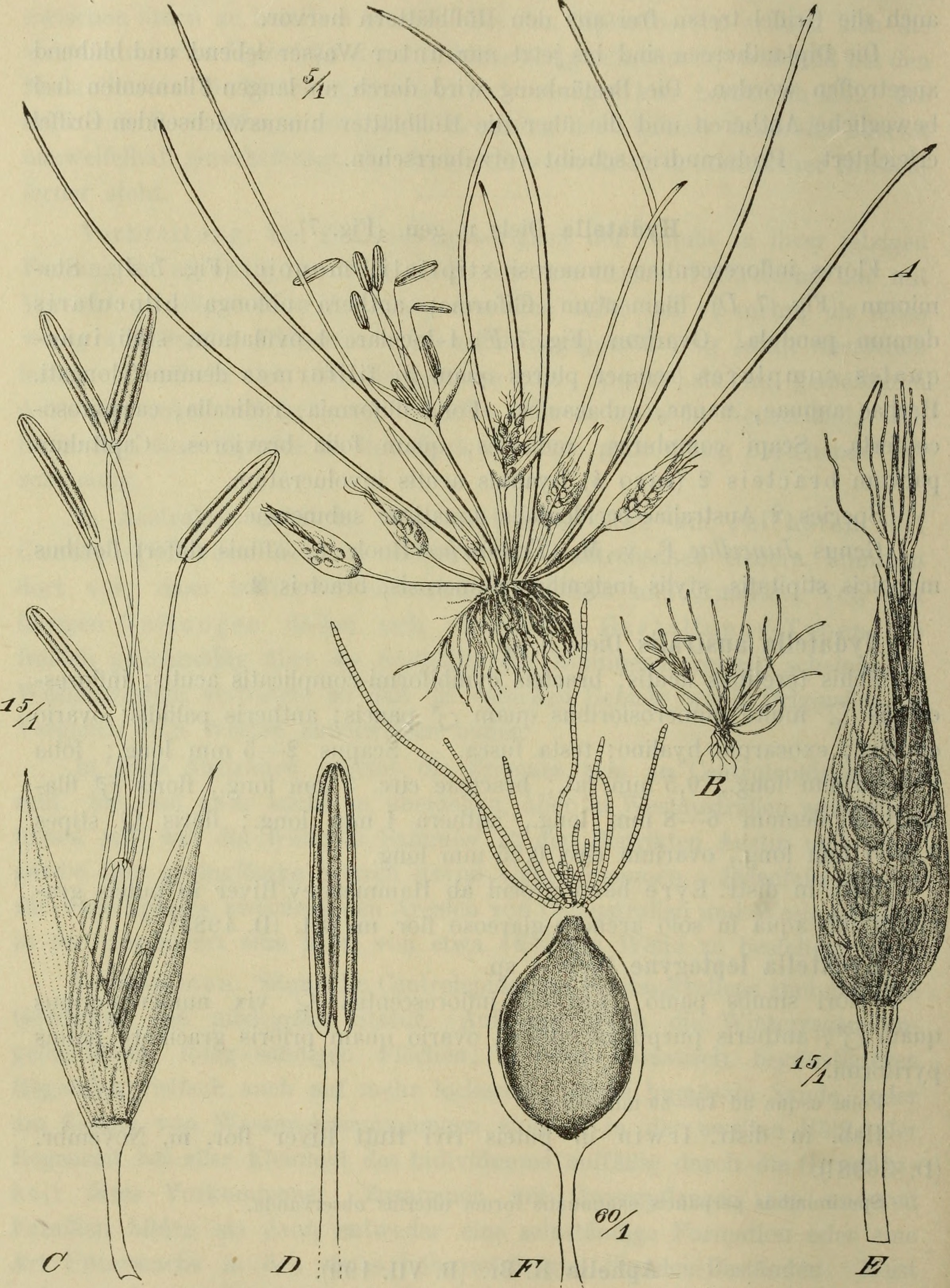
Botanical illustration of Trithuria australis

Plants are submerged and emergent aquatic plants, rooted in the substrate below the water. They are tiny plants, just a few cm tall. Most species are ephemeral aquatics that flower in vernal pools when the water draws down, but several species are submerged perennials found in shallow lakes. The simple leaves are concentrated basally around a short stem. Individual species are cosexual (with several types of hermaphroditic conditions) or dioecious, and are either wind-pollinated (anemophilous) or self-pollinating (autogamous). Two predominantly apomictic species are also known. Flower-like reproductive units are composed of small collections of minute stamen- and/or pistil-like structures that may each represent very reduced individual flower, so that the reproductive units may be pseudanthia. The non-fleshy fruits are follicles or achenes. Hydatellaceae are unusual among angiosperms in allocating nutrients to the embryo before fertilization. In all other flowering plants, nutrient provisioning is known to occur only after fertilization. This trait is similar to gymnosperms, although in gymnosperms the nutrients come from the gametophyte rather than maternal tissue.

=== Cytology ===
The diploid chromosome count of Trithuria inconspicua subsp. inconspicua is 2n = c. 24. The diploid chromosome count of Trithuria submersa is 2n = 56. The diploid chromosome count of the tetraploid species Trithuria konkanensis 2n = 40. The diploid chromosome count of Trithuria australis is 2n = 14.

== Taxonomy ==
The genus Trithuria Hook.f. was described by Joseph Dalton Hooker in 1858 with the type species Trithuria submersa Hook.f. It has two synonyms: In 1888 the genus Juncella F.Muell. ex Hieron. was described without a type designation by Georg Hans Emmo Wolfgang Hieronymus based on previous work by Ferdinand von Mueller. Mueller had invalidly published the nomen invalidum and nomen nudum Juncella tasmanica F.Muell. in 1854. Juncella is a nomen illegitimum. In 1904 the genus Hydatella Diels was described by Friedrich Ludwig Emil Diels without a type designation, but the lectotype Hydatella australis Diels. has been designated in 2008. The genus Hydatella was synonymised with Trithuria in 2008.

Trithuria was initially placed in the family Centrolepidaceae Endl. (now synonymous with Restionaceae R.Br.), which is placed in the order Poales Small but it was separated as its own family Hydatellaceae U.Hamann by Ulrich Hamann in 1976 with Hydatella Diels as the type genus. Upon its separation, Hamann stated the new families affinity or placement were still obscure. The correct placement of the family became apparent in 2007, when it was identified as a basal angiosperm lineage. The family Hydatellaceae is now placed in the order Nymphaeales Salisb. ex Bercht. & J. Presl.. Alternatively, it is placed in a separate order Hydatellales Cronquist ex Reveal & Doweld validly published by James Lauritz Reveal and Alexander Borissowitsch Doweld in 1999 based on previous work by Arthur Cronquist (see the Cronquist system). This is however not widely accepted, as the order Hydatellales is mostly treated as a synonym of Nymphaeales.

=== Etymology ===
The generic name Trithuria is derived from the Greek words τρεις treis meaning "three", and θυρις thyris meaning "window". It references the dehiscence of the capsule fruit.

=== Species ===
Trithuria has 13 species, although species diversity in the family has probably been substantially underestimated.

Phylogeny of Trithuria

- - - sect. Altofinia
      - T. cookeana
      - T. cowieana
    - sect. Hamannia
      - T. polybracteata
      - - T. konkanensis
        - T. lanterna
  - - sect. Trithuria
      - T. occidentalis
      - - T. bibracteata
        - T. submersa
    - sect. Hydatella
      - T. austinensis
      - - T. australis
        - - T. filamentosa
          - T. inconspicua

1. Trithuria austinensis D.D.Sokoloff, Remizowa, T.D.Macfarl. & Rudall Western Australia
2. Trithuria australis (Diels) D.D.Sokoloff, Remizowa, T.D.Macfarl. & Rudall - Western Australia
3. Trithuria bibracteata Stapf ex D.A.Cooke - Western Australia
4. Trithuria cookeana D.D.Sokoloff, Remizowa, T.D.Macfarl. & Rudall - Northern Territory of Australia
5. Trithuria cowieana D.D.Sokoloff, Remizowa, T.D.Macfarl. & Rudall - Northern Territory
6. Trithuria filamentosa Rodway - Tasmania
7. Trithuria fitzgeraldii D.D.Sokoloff, I.Marques, T.D.Macfarl., Rudall & S.W.Graham - Western Australia
8. Trithuria inconspicua Cheeseman - North Island of New Zealand
  Trithuria inconspicua subsp. brevistyla K.A.Ford - endemic to South Island, New Zealand
9. Trithuria konkanensis S.R.Yadav & Janarth. - Maharashtra
10. Trithuria lanterna D.A.Cooke - Northern Territory, Western Australia, Queensland
11. Trithuria occidentalis Benth. - Western Australia
12. Trithuria polybracteata D.A.Cooke ex D.D.Sokoloff, Remizowa, T.D.Macfarl. & Rudall - Western Australia
13. Trithuria submersa Hook.f. - Western Australia, South Australia, Victoria, New South Wales, Tasmania

== Distribution and habitat ==
It is native to India, Australia, and New Zealand, where it occurs in seasonally dry aquatic environments as annuals, or more rarely in permanently inundated habitats as perennial plants.

== Conservation ==
The IUCN conservation status of Trithuria lanterna is Least Concern (LC). Trithuria inconspicua is critically endangered.
