= Trithuria austinensis =

Scientific classification
- Kingdom: Plantae
- Clade: Tracheophytes
- Clade: Angiosperms
- Order: Nymphaeales
- Family: Hydatellaceae
- Genus: Trithuria
- Section: Trithuria sect. Hydatella
- Species: T. austinensis

Binomial name
- Trithuria austinensis D.D.Sokoloff, Remizowa, T.D.Macfarl. & Rudall
- Trithuria austinensis is endemic to Western Australia

Species of aquatic plant

Trithuria austinensis is a species of aquatic plant in the family Hydatellaceae endemic to Western Australia.

== Description ==
=== Vegetative characteristics ===
Trithuria austinensis is an annual herb with green to red, 20–40 mm long, linear leaves.

=== Generative characteristics ===
It is a dioecious species and in large populations male and female plants occur at equal rates. The peduncles of the reproductive units ("flowers") are 10–50 mm long. In male plants, the 2-8 reproductive units consist of 2-4 4.2–7.2 mm long, and 1.0–3.0 mm wide bracts, and 3-15 stamens. In female plants, the up to 30 reproductive units are composed of 3-4 bracts, and 17-22 carpels. The bracts of the female reproductive units exhibit two different shapes.

== Taxonomy ==
Trithuria austinensis D.D.Sokoloff, Remizowa, T.D.Macfarl. & Rudall was published by Dmitry Dmitrievich Sokoloff, Margarita Vasilyena Remizowa, Terry Desmond Macfarlane & Paula J. Rudall in 2008. The type specimen was collected by N. Gibson and M. Lyons in Austin Bay Nature Reserve, Australia on the 16th of November 1995.

== Etymology ==
The specific epithet austinensis refers to the type locality.

== Ecology ==
=== Habitat ===
It has some tolerance towards salty water.

== Conservation ==
It is not threatened. It is known from several populations.
