= Trithuria konkanensis =

Scientific classification
- Kingdom: Plantae
- Clade: Tracheophytes
- Clade: Angiosperms
- Order: Nymphaeales
- Family: Hydatellaceae
- Genus: Trithuria
- Section: Trithuria sect. Hamannia
- Species: T. konkanensis

Binomial name
- Trithuria konkanensis S.R.Yadav & Janarth.
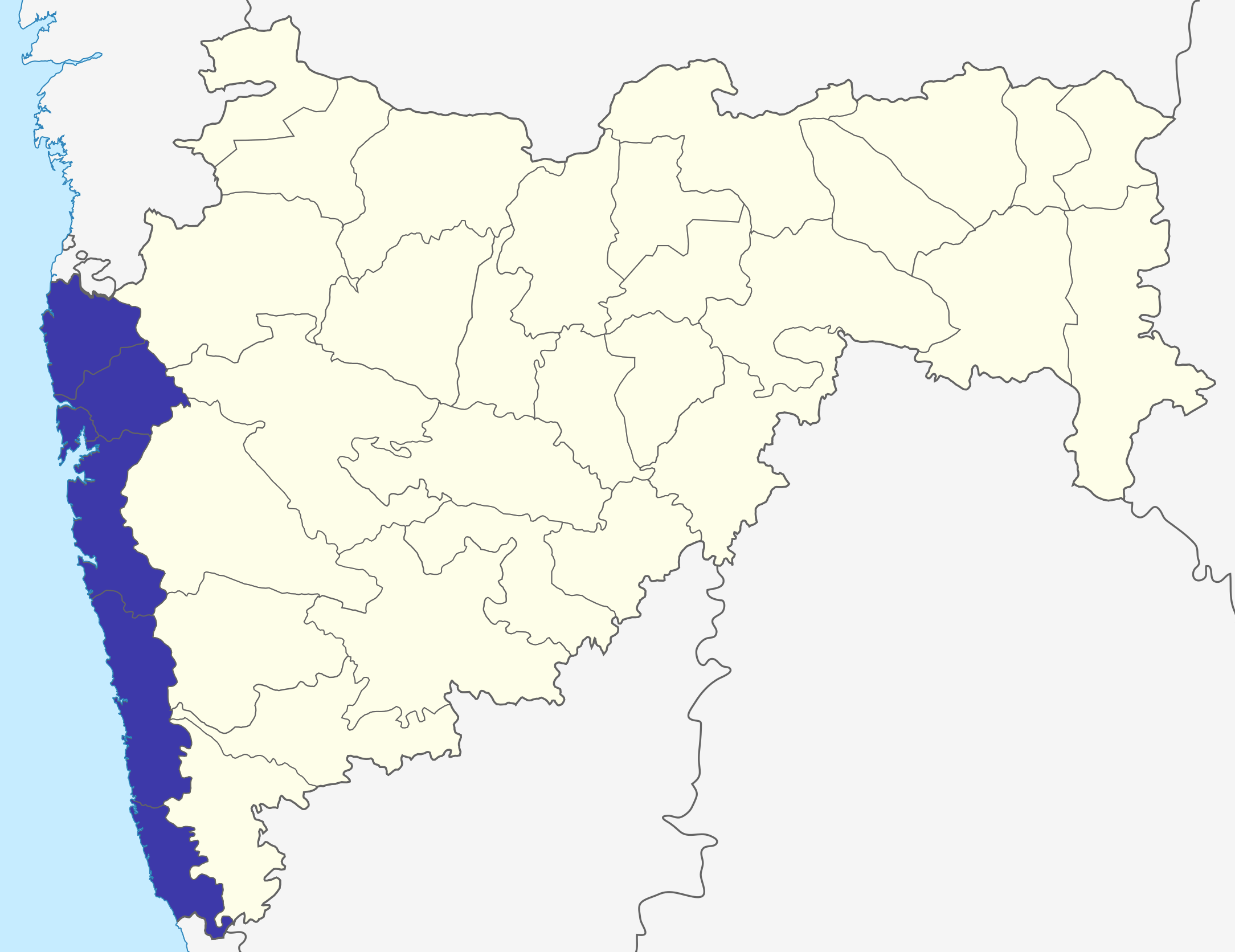
- Trithuria konkanensis is endemic to Konkan

Species of aquatic plant

Trithuria konkanensis is a species of aquatic plant in the family Hydatellaceae endemic to India.

== Description ==
=== Vegetative characteristics ===
It is an annual, green to red, aquatic, 1.3 cm tall herb with numerous linear, erect or spread out, 12 mm long, and 0.8 mm wide leaves produced on reduced stems. The roots are fibrous and unbranched.

=== Generative characteristics ===
It is a monoecious species with numerous, bisexual reproductive units. The reproductive units consist of up to 2 mm long peduncles, two linear, 5 mm long, and 0.6 mm wide bracts, as well as 15-20 carpels, which surround the single, red, central stamen. The pollen grains are 16.1–21.1 μm long, and 14.6–18.1 μm wide. It can self-pollinate, but cross-pollination could possibly also occur. Flowering and fruiting occurs from August to September.

== Cytology ==
It is a tetraploid species with a chromosome count of 2n = 40.

== Distribution ==
It is endemic to India. This is unusual for its genus, as it is the only species occurring outside of Australia and New Zealand.

== Taxonomy ==
It was described by Shrirang Ramchandra Yadav and Malapati Kuppuswamy Janarthanam in 1994. The type specimen was collected by S. R. Yadav and M. K. Janarthanam in Maharashtra, India on the 20th of September 1993. It is placed in Trithuria sect. Hamannia.

== Etymology ==
The specific epithet konkanensis references the Konkan region, from which the type specimen was collected.

== Ecology ==
Its habitat consists of ephemeral bodies of water. The substrate is sand and gravel. It occurs sympatrically with Utricularia, Cyperus, Dimeria, and Eriocaulon. The temperature in its habitat ranges from 18 to 35 °C.
