= Trithuria cowieana =

Trithuria cowieana Temporal range: 4.27 –0 Ma Lower Pliocene – Recent

Scientific classification
- Kingdom: Plantae
- Clade: Tracheophytes
- Clade: Angiosperms
- Order: Nymphaeales
- Family: Hydatellaceae
- Genus: Trithuria
- Section: Trithuria sect. Altofinia
- Species: T. cowieana

Binomial name
- Trithuria cowieana D.D.Sokoloff, Remizowa, T.D.Macfarl. & Rudall
- Trithuria cowieana is endemic to the Northern Territory, Australia

Species of aquatic plant

Trithuria cowieana is a species of aquatic plant in the family Hydatellaceae endemic to the Northern Territory, Australia.

== Description ==
=== Vegetative characteristics ===
Trithuria cowieana is an annual aquatic plant with linear, max. 75 mm long, and 0.3–0.4 mm wide leaves. The plant turns red, once it reaches the flowering stage.

=== Generative characteristics ===
It is a monoecious species with bisexual reproductive units ("flowers"). The reproductive units are produced on 2–110 mm long peduncles. They consist of 4–8(–10), 1.2–2.3 mm long, and (0.2)0.3–0.5(0.6) mm wide involucral bracts, as well as 20–40 carpels, and 1–3 stamens with red filaments. The fruit is 0.28–0.41 mm long. The reproductive units are likely to be self-pollinating.

== Distribution ==
It is endemic to the Northern Territory, Australia.

== Taxonomy ==
Trithuria cowieana D.D.Sokoloff, Remizowa, T.D.Macfarl. & Rudall was described by Dmitry Dmitrievich Sokoloff, Margarita Vasilyena Remizowa, Terry Desmond Macfarlane, and Paula J. Rudall in 2008. The type specimen was collected at the edge of a swamp by C.R. Michell in Northern Marrawal Plateau, Nitmiluk National Park, Northern Territory, Australia on the 28th of March 2002. It is placed in the section Trithuria sect. Altofinia.

== Etymology ==
The specific epithet cowieana honours Ian D. Cowie.

== Conservation ==
The conservation status is Data Deficient. It is known from three localities.

== Ecology ==
It occurs in swamps, and in sand along roads and vehicle tracks.

== Phylogeny ==
Trithuria cowieana split from Trithuria cookeana about 4 million years ago in the lower Pliocene.
