= Trithuria inconspicua subsp. brevistyla =

Scientific classification
- Kingdom: Plantae
- Clade: Tracheophytes
- Clade: Angiosperms
- Order: Nymphaeales
- Family: Hydatellaceae
- Genus: Trithuria
- Species: T. inconspicua
- Subspecies: T. i. subsp. brevistyla

Trinomial name
- Trithuria inconspicua subsp. brevistyla K.A.Ford
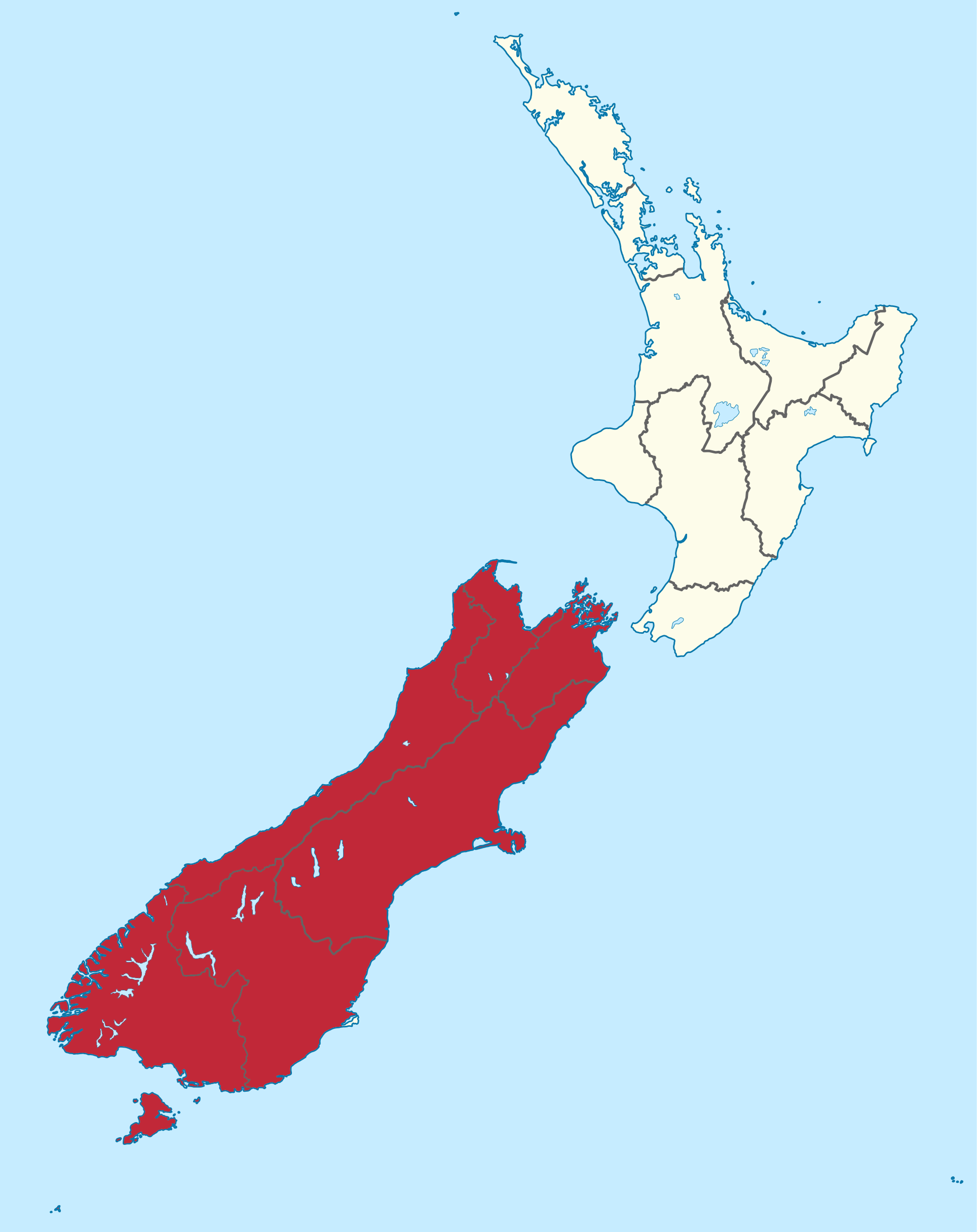
- Trithuria inconspicua subsp. brevistyla is endemic to the South island of New Zealand

Synonyms
- Trithuria brevistyla (K.A.Ford) de Lange & Mosyakin

Species of aquatic plant

Trithuria inconspicua subsp. brevistyla is a subspecies of Trithuria inconspicua in the family Hydatellaceae endemic to the South Island of New Zealand.

== Description ==
=== Vegetative characteristics ===
It is a 10–40 mm tall, aquatic, perennial, rhizomatous herb with adventitious roots as well as 8–37 mm long, and 0.4–0.6 mm wide leaves.

=== Generative characteristics ===
Only female plants are known. Male reproductive structures have not been observed. The 1–5, unisexual, female reproductive units ("flowers") consist of glabrous, terete, 1–6 mm long, and 0.3–0.4 mm wide stalks, which do not elongate with maturity, 2–4(–7) ovate, 1.6–4.0 mm long involucral bracts, and 9–25 carpels with short stigmatic hairs. The globose to ovoid fruit is 0.39–0.56 mm long, and 0.3–0.5 mm wide. It is an apomictic species. Flowering occurs from January to February and fruiting occurs from March to May.

=== Differentiation from Trithuria inconspicua subsp. inconspicua ===
It differs from the autonymous subspecies Trithuria inconspicua subsp. inconspicua in respect to the morphology of the reproductive structures (stalks not elongating with maturity, short stigmatic hairs, and globose to ovoid fruits). In addition, male reproductive structures are known from Trithuria inconspicua subsp. inconspicua, whereas Trithuria inconspicua subsp. brevistyla is considered to be female only.

== Distribution ==
It is endemic to South Island, New Zealand.

== Taxonomy ==
It was published by Kerry Alison Ford in 2019. The type specimen was collected by K.A.Ford and R.D.Smissen in Mary Bay, Lake Hauroko, Southland, New Zealand on the 12th of March 2015. Trithuria inconspicua is placed in Trithuria sect. Hydatella.
It was elevated to the status of the separate species Trithuria brevistyla (K.A.Ford) de Lange & Mosyakin by Peter James de Lange and Sergei Leonidovich Mosyakin within the same year of the original publication (2019), yet there appears to be no consensus for this decision. Trithuria brevistyla (K.A.Ford) de Lange & Mosyakin is treated as a synonym of Trithuria inconspicua subsp. brevistyla K.A.Ford by several sources, but others accept the designation as a separate species.

== Etymology ==
The subspecific epithet brevistyla, from the Latin brevis meaning "brief", and stylus meaning "pencil", refers to the short stigmatic hairs found in this subspecies.

== Conservation ==
It is classified as Nationally Endangered (E). The total area of its habitat is ≤ 100 ha (1 km^{2}).

== Ecology ==
It occurs in lakes at depths of 0.3–2 m, where it grows in gravel, silt, and sand substrates. Rarely during dry seasons it becomes exposed above the water level.
