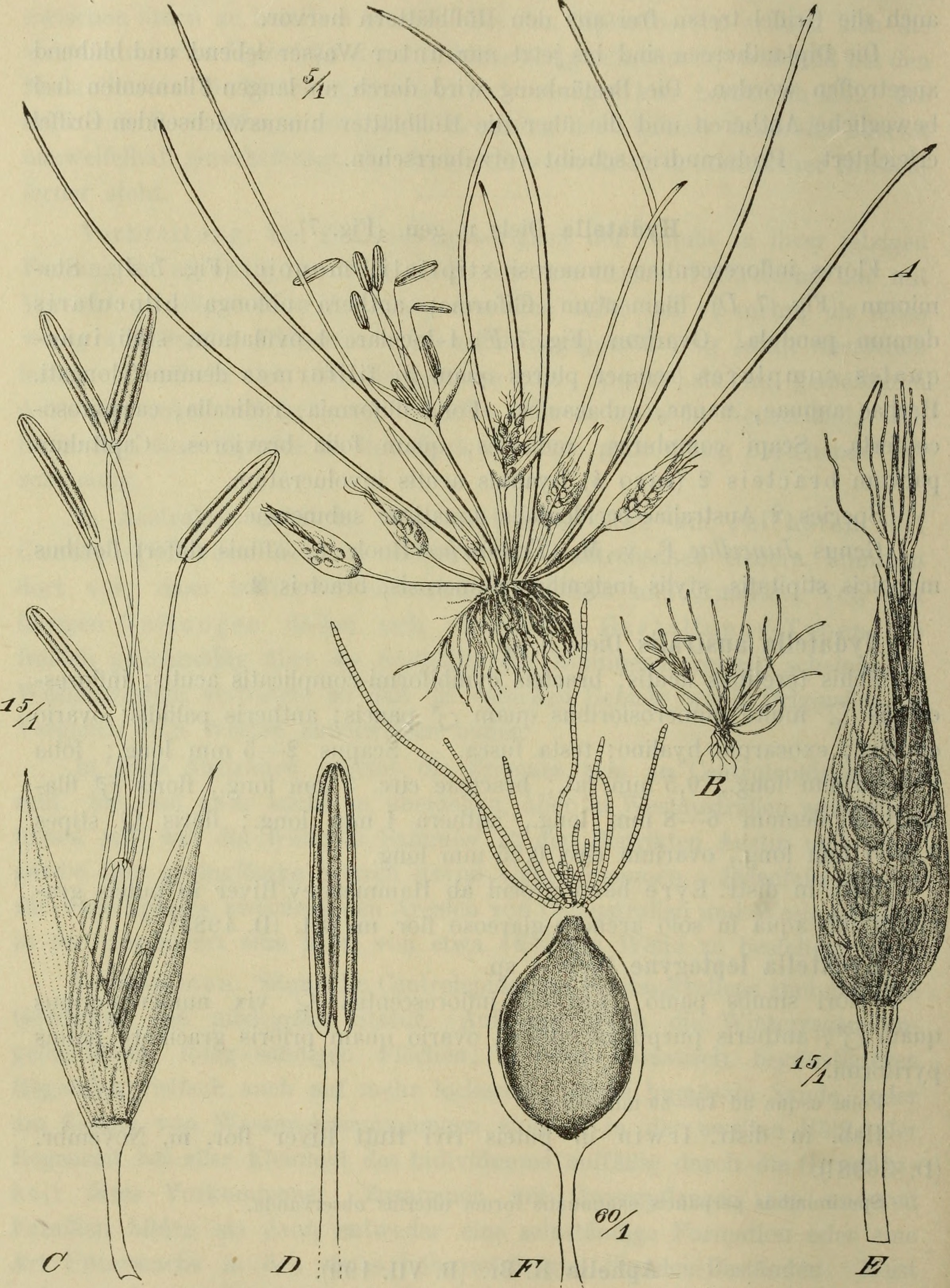
- Botanical illustration of Trithuria australis

Scientific classification
- Kingdom: Plantae
- Clade: Tracheophytes
- Clade: Angiosperms
- Order: Nymphaeales
- Family: Hydatellaceae
- Genus: Trithuria
- Section: Trithuria sect. Hydatella
- Species: T. australis

Binomial name
- Trithuria australis (Diels) D.D.Sokoloff, Remizowa, T.D.Macfarl. & Rudall
- Trithuria australis is endemic to Western Australia

Synonyms
- Hydatella australis Diels; Hydatella leptogyne Diels

= Trithuria australis =

Species of aquatic plant

Trithuria australis is a species of aquatic plant in the family Hydatellaceae endemic to Western Australia.

== Description ==
=== Vegetative characteristics ===
Trithuria australis is an annual, submerged aquatic plant. The terete, pointed leaves are 20–25 mm long, and 0.3 mm wide.

=== Generative characteristics ===
The reproductive units ("flowers") are unisexual. Both female and male reproductive units are present on the same plant. The reproductive units are sessile or exhibit very short peduncles. The male reproductive unit has 3-8 stamens. The seed coat is brown and smooth. It is believed to be self-pollinating.

== Cytology ==
The chromosome count is 2n = 14.

== Distribution ==
It is known from several populations occurring in the Western and Southwestern parts of the state Western Australia.

== Taxonomy ==
Trithuria australis (Diels) D.D.Sokoloff, Remizowa, T.D.Macfarl. & Rudall was first described as Hydatella australis Diels by Friedrich Ludwig Emil Diels in 1904. Later it was included in the genus Trithuria Hook.f. as Trithuria australis (Diels) D.D.Sokoloff, Remizowa, T.D.Macfarl. & Rudall by Dmitry Dmitrievich Sokoloff, Margarita Vasilyena Remizowa, Terry Desmond Macfarlane & Paula J. Rudall in 2008. The type specimen was collected by L. Diels in Hamersley River, Western Australia in October 1901. It is included in Trithuria sect. Hydatella (Diels) D.D. Sokoloff, Iles, Rudall & S.W. Graham, of which it is the type species.

== Etymology ==
The specific epithet australis means southern.

== Ecology ==
=== Habitat ===
It grows in swamps. It occurs sympatrically with Centrolepis.
