= Trithuria filamentosa =

Scientific classification
- Kingdom: Plantae
- Clade: Tracheophytes
- Clade: Angiosperms
- Order: Nymphaeales
- Family: Hydatellaceae
- Genus: Trithuria
- Section: Trithuria sect. Hydatella
- Species: T. filamentosa

Binomial name
- Trithuria filamentosa Rodway
- Trithuria filamentosa is endemic to Tasmania, Australia

Synonyms
- Hydatella filamentosa (Rodway) W.M.Curtis

Species of aquatic plant

Trithuria filamentosa is a species of aquatic plant in the family Hydatellaceae endemic to Tasmania, Australia.

== Description ==
=== Vegetative characteristics ===
It is an annual or perennial, diminutive, aquatic herb with elongate, 0.7–1.5 mm wide, erect, sympodial rhizomes with adventitious roots. The pale green, linear, acute leaves are 1-2 cm long.

=== Generative characteristics ===
It is a monoecious species with mostly unisexual reproductive units ("flowers"), but more rarely with bisexual reproductive units. The male reproductive units, which are fewer in number than the female ones, consist of 2–4, lanceolate, 3–5 mm long bracts, as well as 4–6 stamens. The stamens have red to purple, 2 mm long anthers, and 6 mm long filaments. The female reproductive units consist of 2–4(5) bracts, as well as up to 20 carpels. The elliptical-ovoid, fruit is indehiscent. The seeds are smooth. It may be reproducing apomictically, or may predominantly rely on self-pollination. Flowering and fruiting occurs from December to April.

== Cytology ==
The chloroplast genome is 180562 bp long.

== Distribution ==
It is endemic to Tasmania, Australia.

== Taxonomy ==
It was described by Leonard Rodway in 1897. The lectotype was collected by Rodway in Broad River, Tasmania, Australia in December 1896. It is placed in the section Trithuria sect. Hydatella.

== Etymology ==
The specific epithet filamentosa, from the Latin 'filum' for thread, means thread-like. The stamens have long, filiform filaments.

== Ecology ==
It occurs in marshes, pools on mud flats along rivers, lakes, tarns, and stream margins.
