= Trithuria cookeana =

Trithuria cookeana Temporal range: 4.27 –0 Ma Lower Pliocene – Recent

Scientific classification
- Kingdom: Plantae
- Clade: Tracheophytes
- Clade: Angiosperms
- Order: Nymphaeales
- Family: Hydatellaceae
- Genus: Trithuria
- Section: Trithuria sect. Altofinia
- Species: T. cookeana

Binomial name
- Trithuria cookeana D.D.Sokoloff, Remizowa, T.D.Macfarl. & Rudall
- Trithuria cookeana is endemic to the Northern Territory, Australia

Species of aquatic plant

Trithuria cookeana is a species of aquatic plant in the family Hydatellaceae endemic to the Northern Territory, Australia.

== Description ==
=== Vegetative characteristics ===
Trithuria cookeana is an annual aquatic herb with linear leaves. The plant displays red colouration, once it starts flowering.

=== Generative characteristics ===
It is a dioecious plant with unisexual reproductive units ("flowers"). Male individuals have 10 reproductive units, which are produced on 13–30 mm long peduncles. The male reproductive unit is composed of 5–7, 6.0–8.2 mm long, and 1–1.5 mm wide involucral bracts, and 14–17 stamens. The anthers are 1.7–1.9 mm long. Female individuals produce up to 45 reproductive units on 12–40 mm long peduncles. The female reproductive unit is composed of 10–16(–21), 1.5–2.6 mm long, and 0.15–0.45 mm wide involucral bracts, as well as more than 40 carpels. The 0.29–0.31 mm long, indehiscent fruit bears smooth seeds.

== Distribution ==
It occurs in the swamps of the Northern Territory, Australia.

== Taxonomy ==
Trithuria cookeana D.D.Sokoloff, Remizowa, T.D.Macfarl. & Rudall was published by Dmitry Dmitrievich Sokoloff, Margarita Vasilyena Remizowa, Terry Desmond Macfarlane & Paula J. Rudall in 2008. The type specimen was collected by Ian D. Cowie 24 km Southeast of Maningrida, Northern Territory, Australia on the 22nd of August 1995. It is placed in Trithuria sect. Altofinia.

== Etymology ==
The specific epithet cookeana honours David Alan Cooke.

== Conservation ==
The conservation status is Data Deficient. It is only known from a single locality.

== Ecology ==
It occurs sympatrically with Utricularia growing on damp sand at the edge of drying swamps with Melaleuca viridifolia growing in the overstory layer. The swamp habitat dries out by August.

== Phylogeny ==
Trithuria cookeana split from Trithuria cowieana about 4 million years ago in the lower Pliocene.
