= Trithuria sect. Altofinia =

Trithuria sect. Altofinia Temporal range: 6.15 –0 Ma Upper Miocene – Recent

Scientific classification
- Kingdom: Plantae
- Clade: Tracheophytes
- Clade: Angiosperms
- Order: Nymphaeales
- Family: Hydatellaceae
- Genus: Trithuria
- Section: Trithuria sect. Altofinia; D.D. Sokoloff, Iles, Rudall & S.W. Graham

Type species
- Trithuria cowieana D.D. Sokoloff, Remizowa, T.D. Macfarl. & Rudall

Species
- See here

Section of the genus Trithuria in the family Hydatellaceae

Trithuria sect. Altofinia is a section within the genus Trithuria native to Australia.

== Description ==
The indehiscent, slightly beaked, apocarpous berry fruit with papillae does not have longitudinal ribs or distinct epicuticular wax deposits on the surface. The fruit stalk bears a distal constriction, serving as an abscission zone. The smooth seeds have a thick cuticle.

== Taxonomy ==
It was described by Dmitry Dmitrievich Sokoloff, William J. D. Iles, Paula J. Rudall, and Sean W. Graham with Trithuria cowieana D.D. Sokoloff, Remizowa, T.D. Macfarl. & Rudall. as the type species.

=== Species ===
It has two species:

- Trithuria cookeana D.D.Sokoloff, Remizowa, T.D.Macfarl. & Rudall
- Trithuria cowieana D.D.Sokoloff, Remizowa, T.D.Macfarl. & Rudall

=== Etymology ===
The section name Altofinia is derived from altus meaning elevated or high, and finis meaning limit or boundary. It refers to the geographic distribution of its species, which occur on the upper end of the Northern Territory, Australia.

== Distribution ==
Its species occur in Australia (Northern Territory).

== Phylogeny ==
Trithuria sect. Altofinia split from Trithuria sect. Hamannia about 6 million years ago in the Upper Miocene.
