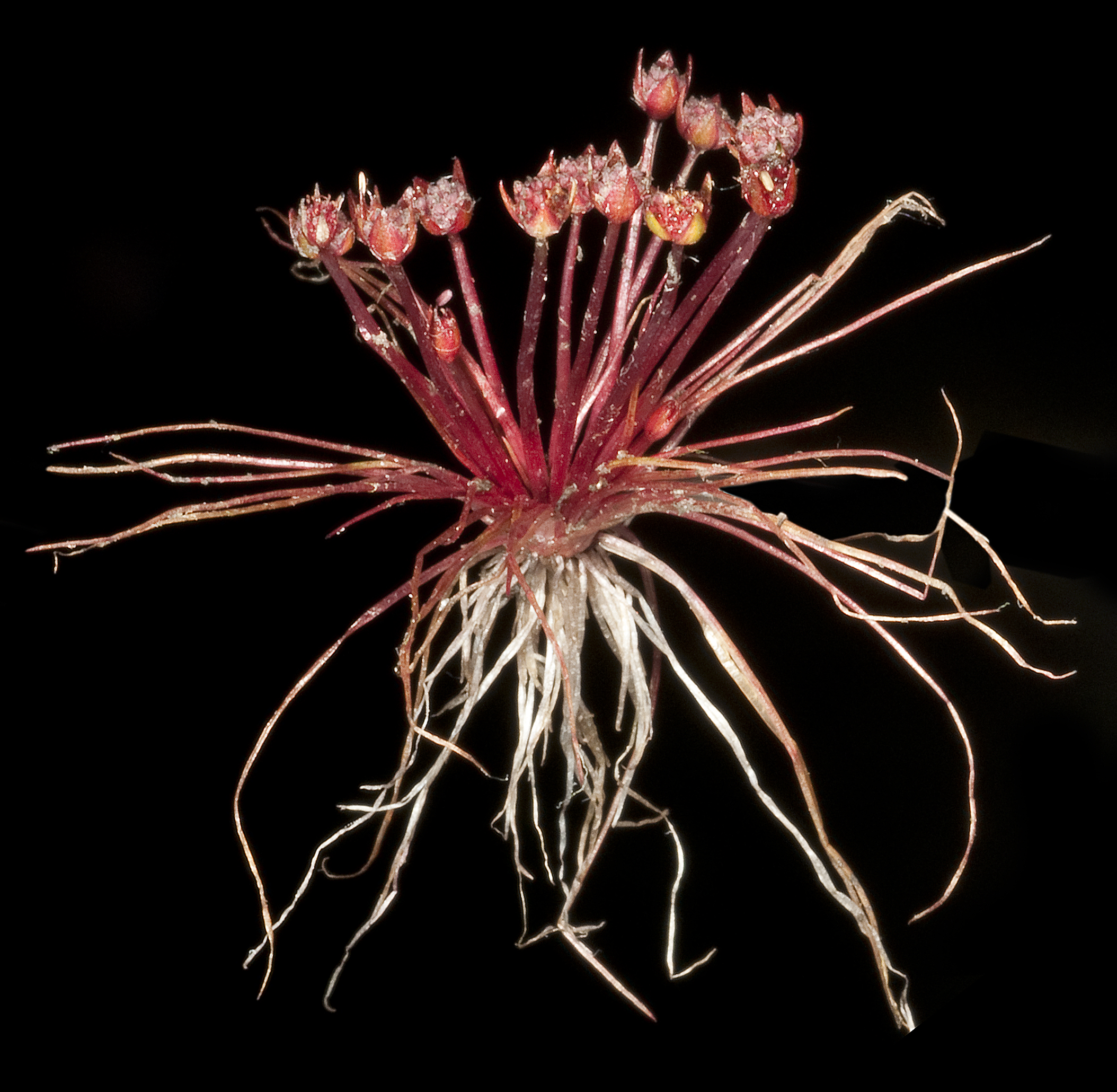
- Complete flowering Trithuria submersa specimen

Scientific classification
- Kingdom: Plantae
- Clade: Tracheophytes
- Clade: Angiosperms
- Order: Nymphaeales
- Family: Hydatellaceae
- Genus: Trithuria
- Section: Trithuria sect. Trithuria
- Species: T. submersa

Binomial name
- Trithuria submersa Hook.f.
- Trithuria submersa is endemic to Australia

Synonyms
- Juncella submersa (Hook.f.) Hieron.

= Trithuria submersa =

Species of aquatic plant

Trithuria submersa is a species of plant in the family Hydatellaceae endemic to the Australian states of New South Wales, South Australia, Tasmania, Victoria, and Western Australia.

== Description ==
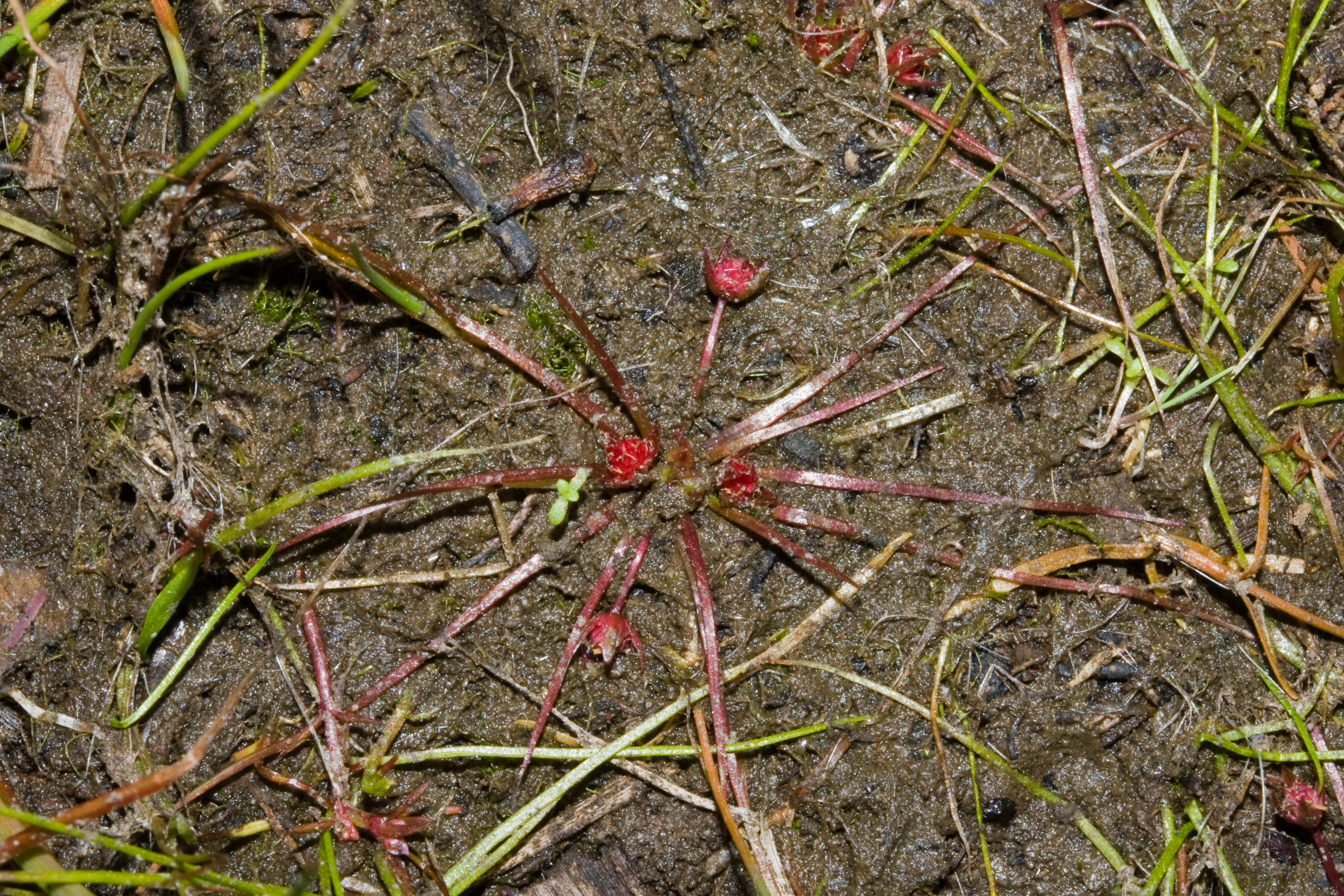
Flowering Trithuria submersa

=== Vegetative characteristics ===
It is a 8 cm tall, and 2-5 cm wide, annual herb with glabrous, red, 15–40(–50) mm long, and up to 1 mm wide leaves and fibrous roots. Individuals growing submerged in water are slender and green in colour.

=== Generative characteristics ===
It is a monoecious species with emergent, bisexual reproductive units ("flowers"). The several 2–3 mm wide reproductive units consist of (5–)10–32(–40) mm long stalks, (2–)4–8 ovate to lanceolate, 2–4 mm long bracts, 10–20(–35) carpels with 3-6 stigmatic hairs, and 2–4 central stamens with 2 mm long red filaments and purple anthers, which are 0.6 mm long. The three-ribbed, obovoid, 0.5–0.8 mm long fruit bears sculptured, brown, 0.5 mm long, and 0.3 mm wide seeds. It is a self-pollinating species. Flowering and fruiting occurs from September to January. Seed germination occurs in winter, once the seasonally dry habitat becomes wet.

=== Cytology ===
The diploid chromosome count is 2n = 56.

== Taxonomy ==
It was published by Joseph Dalton Hooker in 1858. The lectotype was collected by R.C. Gunn in Macquarie River, Tasmania, Australia on the 6th of November 1845. It is the type species of its genus. It is placed in Trithuria sect. Trithuria.

=== Etymology ===
The specific epithet submersa, meaning "underwater", refers to the species aquatic habitat.

== Distribution ==
It is endemic to the Australian states New South Wales, South Australia, Tasmania, Victoria, and Western Australia.

== Conservation ==
Under the Threatened Species Protection Act 1995, it is classified as rare.

== Ecology ==
It occurs in temporary pools, at the edge of streams, and seasonal swamps.
