= Trithuria fitzgeraldii =

Scientific classification
- Kingdom: Plantae
- Clade: Tracheophytes
- Clade: Angiosperms
- Order: Nymphaeales
- Family: Hydatellaceae
- Genus: Trithuria
- Species: T. fitzgeraldii

Binomial name
- Trithuria fitzgeraldii D.D.Sokoloff, I.Marques, T.D.Macfarl., Rudall & S.W.Graham
- Trithuria fitzgeraldii is endemic to Western Australia

Species of aquatic plant

Trithuria fitzgeraldii is a species of aquatic plant in the family Hydatellaceae endemic to Western Australia.

== Description ==
=== Vegetative characteristics ===
It is a diminutive, annual, aquatic plant with 12–30 mm long, and 0.15–0.4 mm wide leaves.

=== Generative characteristics ===
It is a monoecious species with shortly stalked or sessile, unisexual reproductive units. The two involucral bracts are 1.3–3.8 mm long, and 0.4–0.7 mm wide. The male reproductive units consist of two bracts, and have 0.8–0.9 mm long anthers. The more numerous female reproductive units, which surround the male ones, has two bracts, and bears carpels with up to 2 mm long stigmatic papillae. The ellipsoidal, indehiscent fruit is 0.31–0.52 mm long, and 0.16–0.32 mm wide.

== Distribution ==
It is endemic to Western Australia.

== Taxonomy ==
It was described by Dmitry Dmitrievich Sokoloff, Isabel Marques, Terry Desmond Macfarlane, Paula J. Rudall, and Sean W. Graham in 2019. The type specimen was collected by N. Gibson about 4 km North of Waroona in the Australian state of Western Australia on the 5th of November 2004.

== Etymology ==
The specific epithet fitzgeraldii honours William Vincent Fitzgerald (1867–1929).

== Conservation ==
It is not threatened. It is known from several localities.

== Ecology ==
It occurs in ephemeral, freshwater to slightly saline pools at the edge of lakes or swamps. The substrate it grows in is clayey sand or clay.
