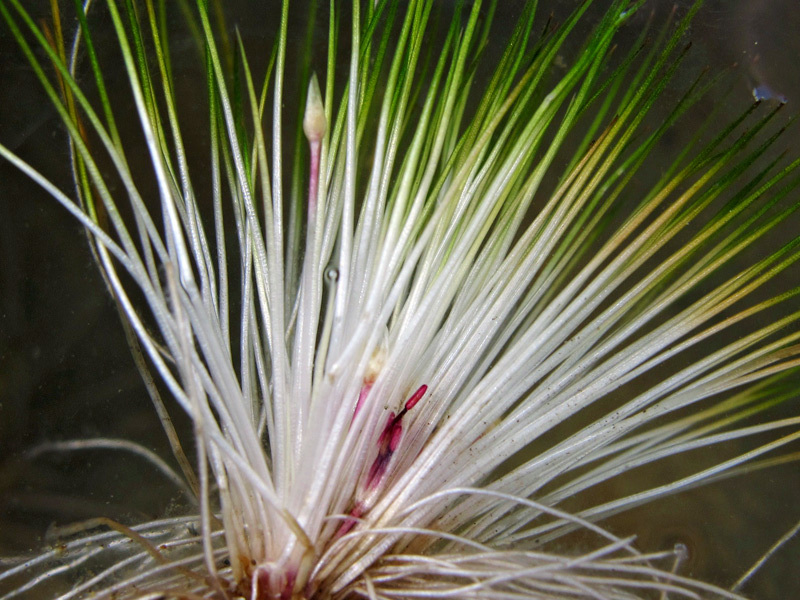
- Flowering Trithuria inconspicua

Scientific classification
- Kingdom: Plantae
- Clade: Tracheophytes
- Clade: Angiosperms
- Order: Nymphaeales
- Family: Hydatellaceae
- Genus: Trithuria
- Section: Trithuria sect. Hydatella (Diels) D.D. Sokoloff, Iles, Rudall & S.W. Graham

Type species
- Trithuria australis (Diels) D.D. Sokoloff, Remizowa, T.D. Macfarl. & Rudall

Species
- See here

= Trithuria sect. Hydatella =

Trithuria sect. Hydatella Temporal range: 16.07 –0 Ma Early Miocene – Recent

Section of the genus Trithuria in the family Hydatellaceae

Trithuria sect. Hydatella is a section within the genus Trithuria native to New Zealand and Australia.

== Description ==
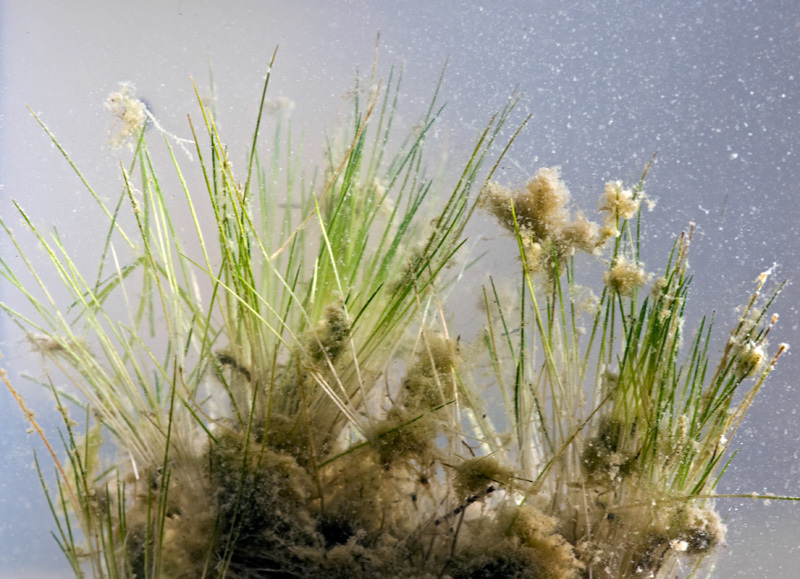
Trithuria inconspicua

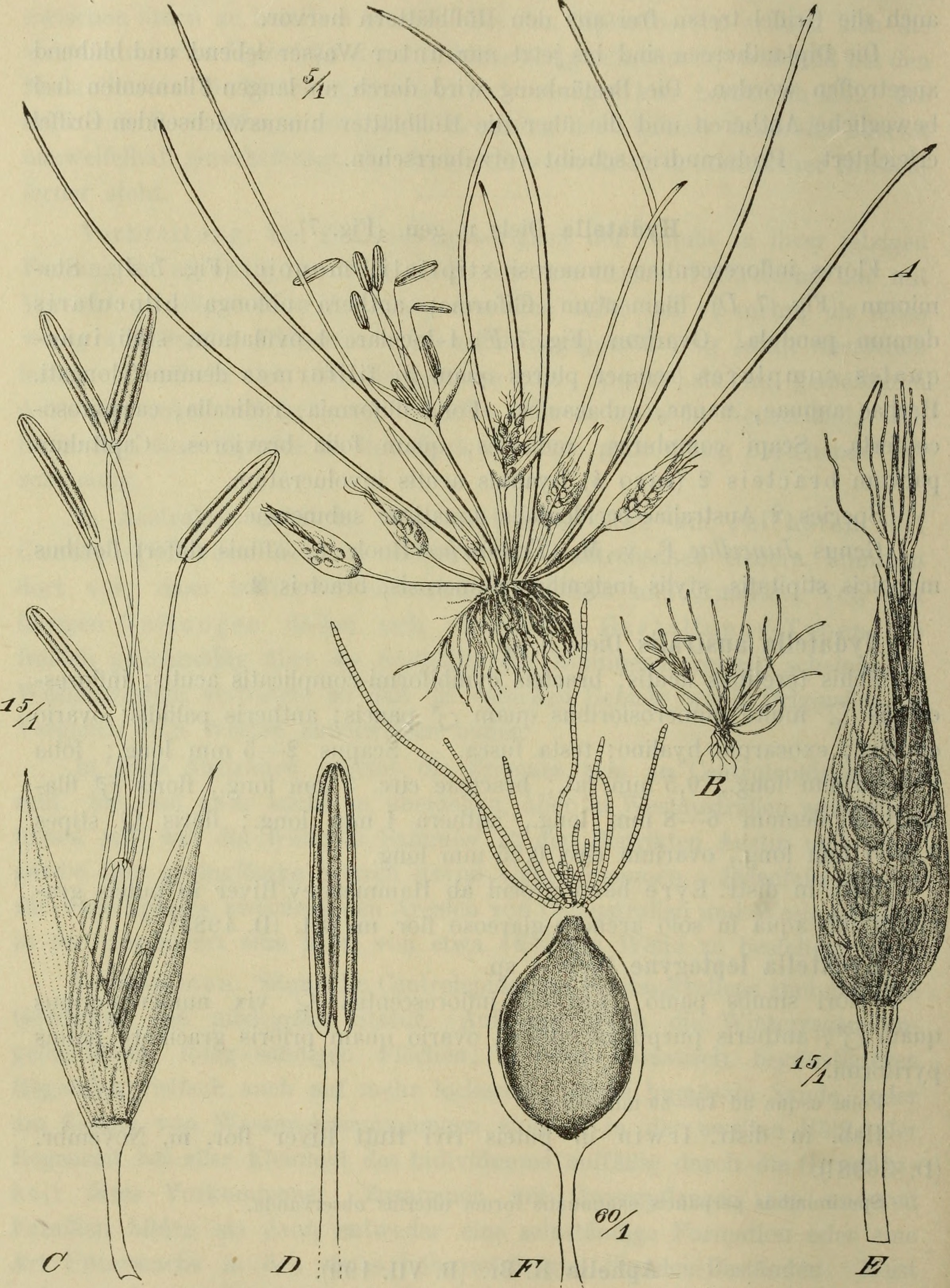
Botanical illustration of Trithuria australis

The apocarpous berry fruit is indehiscent. Pericarp papillae and pericarp ribs are absent. The fruit stalk bears a distal constriction, serving as an abscission zone. The seed cuticle is thick.

== Taxonomy ==
It was first described as Hydatella Diels by Friedrich Ludwig Emil Diels in 1904. After the former genus Hydatella Diels was merged into Trithuria Hook.f. in 2008, the section Trithuria sect. Hydatella (Diels) D.D. Sokoloff, Iles, Rudall & S.W. Graham was described by Dmitry Dmitrievich Sokoloff, William J. D. Iles, Paula J. Rudall, and Sean W. Graham in 2012.

=== Species ===
It has four species:

- Trithuria austinensis D.D.Sokoloff, Remizowa, T.D.Macfarl. & Rudall
- Trithuria australis (Diels) D.D.Sokoloff, Remizowa, T.D.Macfarl. & Rudall
- Trithuria filamentosa Rodway
- Trithuria inconspicua Cheeseman
  Trithuria inconspicua subsp. brevistyla K.A.Ford

=== Etymology ===
The section name Hydatella comes from the former genus Hydatella Diels, whose name is derived from the diminutive of ύδωρ (hydor) meaning water.

== Distribution ==
Its species occur in New Zealand (North Island, South Island) and Australia (Tasmania, Australian mainland).

== Phylogeny ==
Trithuria sect. Hydatella split from Trithuria sect. Trithuria about 16 million years ago in the Early Miocene.
