= Trithuria sect. Hamannia =

Trithuria sect. Hamannia Temporal range: 6.15 –0 Ma Upper Miocene – Recent

Scientific classification
- Kingdom: Plantae
- Clade: Tracheophytes
- Clade: Angiosperms
- Order: Nymphaeales
- Family: Hydatellaceae
- Genus: Trithuria
- Section: Trithuria sect. Hamannia; D.D. Sokoloff, Iles, Rudall & S.W. Graham

Type species
- Trithuria lanterna D.A. Cooke

Species
- See here

Section of the genus Trithuria in the family Hydatellaceae

Trithuria sect. Hamannia is a section within the genus Trithuria native to Australia and India.

== Description ==
The dehiscent, elliptical, apocarpous, monomerous follicle fruit has three longitudinal pericarp ribs. The fruit does not have papillae, doesn't have distinct epicuticular wax deposits, and the apex does not have thickened endocarp cells. The fruit apex also does not have a distinct beak. The fruit splits into three parts along the longitudinal ribs. The smooth seed has a thick cuticle. The sheathless cotyledon is strongly reduced.

== Taxonomy ==
It was described by Dmitry Dmitrievich Sokoloff, William J. D. Iles, Paula J. Rudall, and Sean W. Graham in 2012 with Trithuria lanterna D.A. Cooke as the type species.

=== Species ===
It has three species:

- Trithuria polybracteata D.A.Cooke ex D.D.Sokoloff, Remizowa, T.D.Macfarl. & Rudall
- Trithuria konkanensis S.R.Yadav & Janarth.
- Trithuria lanterna D.A.Cooke

=== Etymology ===
The section name Hamannia honours Ulrich Hamann who worked on and described the family Hydatellaceae.

== Distribution ==
Its species occur in India (Western Ghats) and Australia (tropical Western Australia, tropical northern Australia).

== Phylogeny ==
Trithuria sect. Hamannia split from Trithuria sect. Altofinia about 6 million years ago in the Upper Miocene.
