= Trithuria lanterna =

Conservation status
- Least Concern (NCA)
- Least Concern (IUCN 3.1)

Scientific classification
- Kingdom: Plantae
- Clade: Tracheophytes
- Clade: Angiosperms
- Order: Nymphaeales
- Family: Hydatellaceae
- Genus: Trithuria
- Section: Trithuria sect. Hamannia
- Species: T. lanterna

Binomial name
- Trithuria lanterna D.A.Cooke
- Trithuria lanterna is endemic to Australia

Species of aquatic plant

Trithuria lanterna is a species of plant in the family Hydatellaceae endemic to Australia.

== Description ==
=== Vegetative characteristics ===
Trithuria lanterna is a 10 mm tall and 30 mm wide, annual herb with very short stems bearing fibrous roots and basal, linear, 5–18 mm long, and 0.8 wide leaves. It often displays red colouration.

=== Generative characteristics ===
It is a monoecious species with bisexual reproductive units ("flowers"). The several, sessile reproductive units have 2–4 lanceolate, 2–3 mm long involucral bracts, 1–2 stamens with 0.6–1.0 mm long anthers attached to up to 1.5 mm long filaments, as well as 6-20 carpels. The ovoid-trigonous, 0.4 mm long, and 0.2 mm wide fruit with three prominent ribs is indehiscent, or at least in one case dehiscent. The ovoid, 0.3 mm long, translucent seed with a dark apex is smooth. Flowering occurs from April to June.

== Distribution ==
It is native to the Northern Territory, Queensland, and Western Australia.

== Taxonomy ==
It was published by David Alan Cooke in 1981. The type specimen was collected by R.L. Specht on Bickerton Island in the Gulf of Carpentaria, South Bay, Northern Territory, Australia on the 14th of June 1948. It is placed in Trithuria sect. Hamannia.

== Etymology ==
The specific epithet lanterna, from the Latin lanterna meaning lantern, refers to the morphology of the pericarp, which has a three-windowed structure resembling a lantern.

== Conservation ==
It is not threatened. The Nature Conservation Act status is least concern. Likewise, the IUCN conservation status is least concern (LC).

== Ecology ==
It occurs in ephemeral pools, seasonal swamps dominated by Melaleuca leucadendron, and stream margins.
