= Trithuria polybracteata =

Scientific classification
- Kingdom: Plantae
- Clade: Tracheophytes
- Clade: Angiosperms
- Order: Nymphaeales
- Family: Hydatellaceae
- Genus: Trithuria
- Section: Trithuria sect. Hamannia
- Species: T. polybracteata

Binomial name
- Trithuria polybracteata D.A.Cooke ex D.D.Sokoloff, Remizowa, T.D.Macfarl. & Rudall
- Trithuria polybracteata is endemic to Western Australia

Species of aquatic plant

Trithuria polybracteata is a species of plant in the family Hydatellaceae endemic to Western Australia.

== Description ==
=== Vegetative characteristics ===
It is an annual herb with linear, basal, up to 15 mm long, and 0.5 mm wide leaves.

=== Generative characteristics ===
It is a dioecious species with unisexual reproductive units ("flowers"). Female plants produce up to 20 reproductive units with 15–27 mm long peduncles, 12–25(–30) bracts, and many carpels with up to 1.5 mm long stigmatic hairs. Male plants produce reproductive units with 10–11 mm long peduncles, 5–9 bracts and 9–11 stamens. The anthers are 1.5–2.0 mm long. The 0.2–0.25 mm long fruits with a three-ribbed pericarp bear smooth seeds. Being dioecious, it is an obligate xenogamous species.

== Distribution ==
It is endemic to Western Australia.

== Taxonomy ==
It was published by Dmitry Dmitrievich Sokoloff, Margarita Vasilyena Remizowa, Terry Desmond Macfarlane, and Paula J. Rudall in 2008 based on previous work by David Alan Cooke. The type specimen was collected by J.H.Willis in North Kimberley on the 26th of May 1984. It is placed in Trithuria sect. Hamannia.

== Etymology ==
The specific epithet polybracteata, from poly- meaning "many", and -bracteata meaning "bearing bracts", means bearing many bracts.
It has numerous bracts surrounding the reproductive units.

== Conservation ==
Under the Biodiversity Conservation Act 2016, it is classified as a Priority 1: Poorly-known species. It is only known from a single locality.

== Ecology ==
It is known to occur in springs growing together with Utricularia. It has been speculated to show some degree of tolerance towards salinity.
