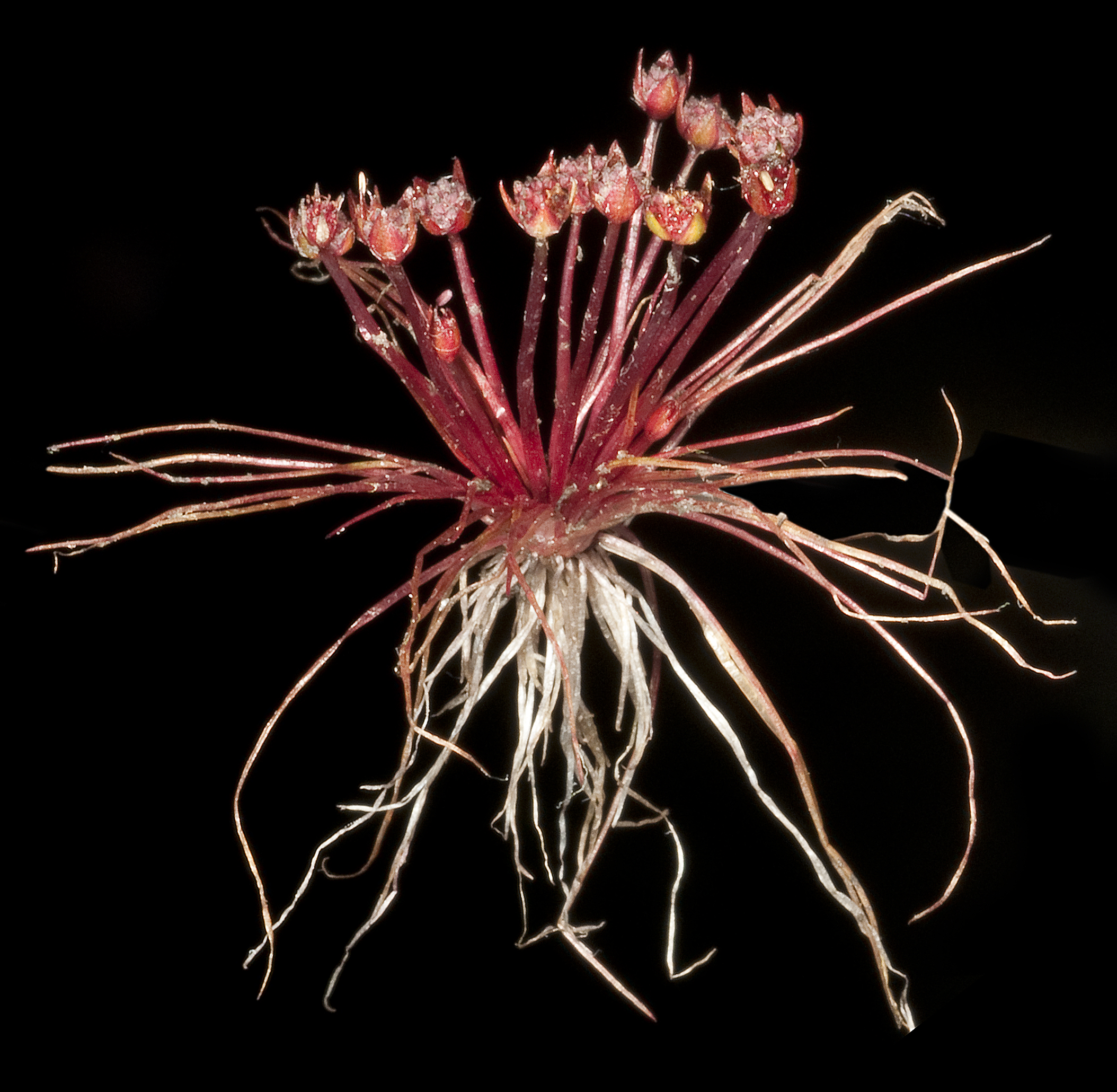
- Flowering Trithuria submersa

Scientific classification
- Kingdom: Plantae
- Clade: Tracheophytes
- Clade: Angiosperms
- Order: Nymphaeales
- Family: Hydatellaceae
- Genus: Trithuria
- Section: Trithuria sect. Trithuria (Autonym)

Type species
- Trithuria submersa Hook.f.

Species
- See here

= Trithuria sect. Trithuria =

Trithuria sect. Trithuria Temporal range: 16.07 –0 Ma Early Miocene – Recent

Section of the genus Trithuria in the family Hydatellaceae

Trithuria sect. Trithuria is a section within the genus Trithuria native to Australia.

== Description ==
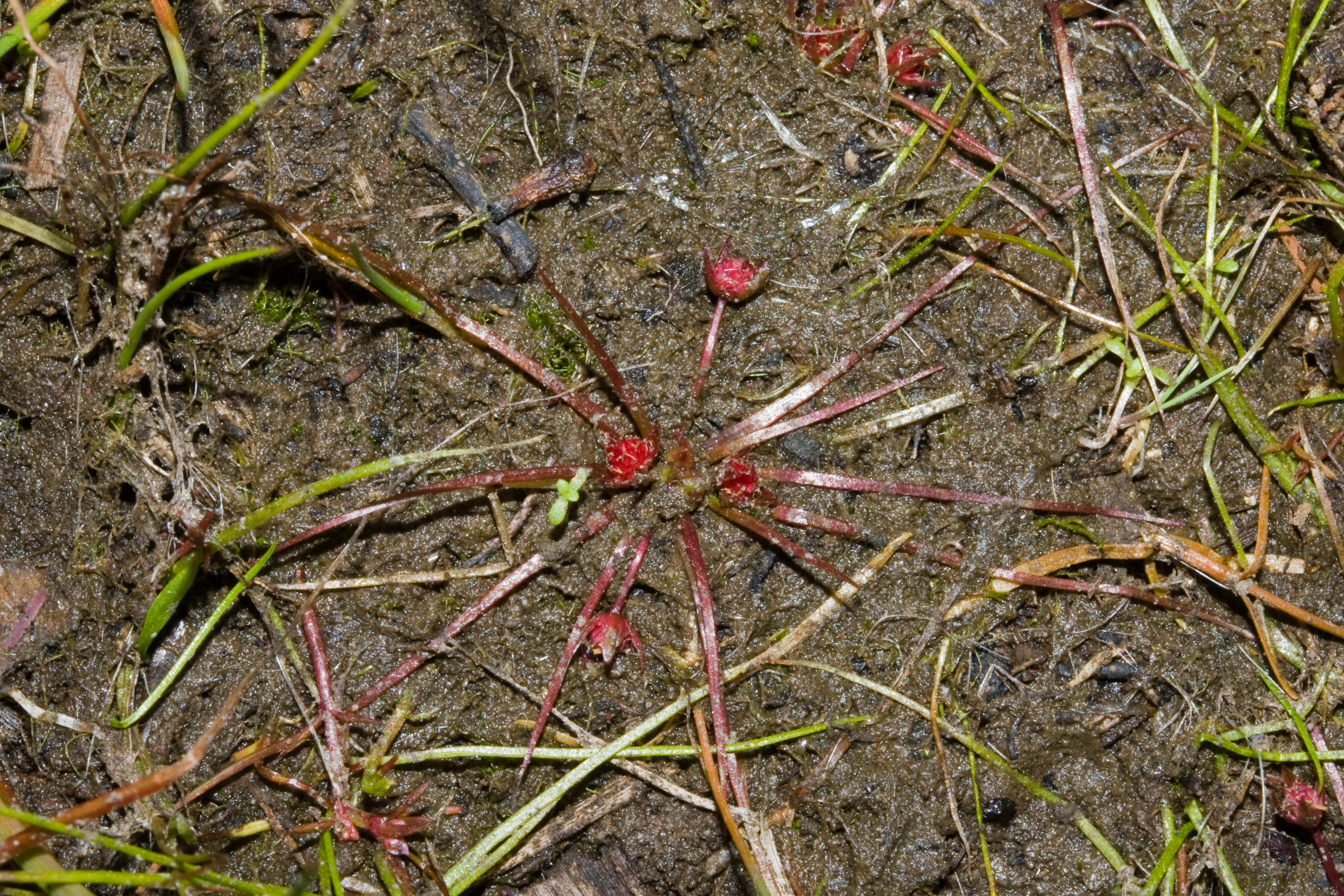
Fruiting Trithuria submersa in Tasmannia, Australia

The dehiscent fruit is a apocarpous monomerous follicle, which splits into three parts. The strongly sculptured seed does not have a thick cuticular layer.

== Taxonomy ==
The type species is Trithuria submersa Hook. f.

=== Species ===
It has three species:

- Trithuria bibracteata Stapf ex D.A.Cooke
- Trithuria occidentalis Benth.
- Trithuria submersa Hook.f.

=== Etymology ===
The section name Trithuria is derived from the Greek words τρεις treis meaning "three", and θυρις thyris meaning "window". It references the dehiscence of the fruit.

== Distribution ==
Its species occur in Australia (Southwest Western Australia, Tasmania, and Southeast mainland Australia).

== Phylogeny ==
Trithuria sect. Trithuria split from Trithuria sect. Hydatella about 16 million years ago in the Early Miocene.
