= Trithuria occidentalis =

Conservation status
- Endangered (EPBC Act)

Scientific classification
- Kingdom: Plantae
- Clade: Tracheophytes
- Clade: Angiosperms
- Order: Nymphaeales
- Family: Hydatellaceae
- Genus: Trithuria
- Section: Trithuria sect. Trithuria
- Species: T. occidentalis

Binomial name
- Trithuria occidentalis Benth.
- Trithuria occidentalis is endemic to Western Australia

Synonyms
- Juncella occidentalis (Benth.) Hieron.; Hydatella dioica D.A.Cooke

Species of aquatic plant

Trithuria occidentalis is a species of plant in the family Hydatellaceae endemic to Western Australia.

== Description ==
=== Vegetative characteristics ===
It is an annual, 2-3 cm tall, aquatic herb with 2-3 cm long, and 1 mm wide, red, linear leaves. The midveins of the leaves are prominent.

=== Generative characteristics ===
It is a dioecious species with unisexual reproductive units. It exhibits sexual dimorphism in respect to the number of bracts present in the reproductive units ("flowers"). The male reproductive units consist of 3 mm long, erect stalks with 2 lanceolate, 7-8 mm long bracts, as well as 8-10 stamens. The stamens consist of linear, 3 mm long, faintly yellow anthers, and 1 cm long filaments. The female plants produce smaller reproductive units with 8–9(–12) 1.5-2.2mm long bracts enclosing 8-10 carpels. The dehiscent fruit bears seeds, which are sculptured.

== Distribution ==
It is endemic to Western Australia, where it is restricted to a small area north-east from Perth.

== Taxonomy ==
Trithuria occidentalis Benth. was first described by George Bentham in 1878. Later synonyms include Juncella occidentalis (Benth.) Hieron. and Hydatella dioica D.A.Cooke. The type specimen was collected by James Drummond in Swan River, Western Australia. It is placed in Trithuria sect. Trithuria. The description of Hydatella dioica D.A.Cooke was based on a male individual of Trithuria occidentalis Benth.

== Etymology ==
The specific epithet occidentalis means western.

== Conservation ==
It is a threatened species. Under the Western Australian Wildlife Conservation Act of 1950, it is declared as Rare Flora. According to the IUCN criteria, it is classified as Critically Endangered (CR). It is classified as endangered both under the Environment Protection and Biodiversity Conservation Act 1999 and the Biodiversity Conservation Act 2016. In 1982, about 1000 plants were recorded. By 2007, the number of recorded individuals had dropped below 200 plants.

== Ecology ==
It occurs in seasonal swamps, and shallow, winter-wet claypans.
