= List of strawberry cultivars =

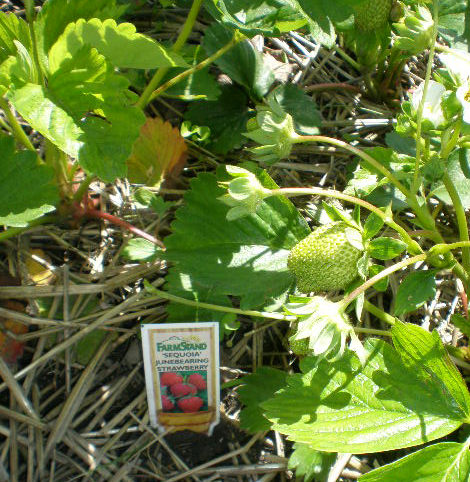
Strawberry plants with label indicating the cultivar ('Sequoia')

The following is a partial list of strawberry cultivars. Strawberries come in a wide assortment of commercially available cultivars (cultivated varieties). Differences between cultivars may include the date the fruit ripens, disease resistance, freezing quality, firmness, berry size, berry shape, and flavor. Many different cultivars have been developed at the University of California (Davis campus), by Driscoll Strawberry Associates Inc. (Watsonville, California), the United States Department of Agriculture, Agriculture and Agri-Food Canada and East Malling Research Station in the UK.

Almost all the strawberries listed below are cultivars of Fragaria × ananassa. Two cultivars listed here ('Frel' (Pink Panda) and 'Samba' (Red Ruby)) are bigeneric hybrids, grown mainly for their flower colour rather than their fruit, using a closely related species (Potentilla palustris = Comarum palustre) to introduce pink or red colouration to the flowers.

The cultivar Fragaria × ananassa 'Variegata' is grown mainly for the decorative qualities of its variegated foliage.

== Table ==
This table includes a list of strawberry cultivars that are commercially available.

Cultivar names should be shown in single quotes. Names shown in Small Capitals are trade designations, or "selling names", used in certain countries (with the cultivar name shown alongside); the same cultivar may be sold under a different trade designation in other countries.

Variety	Image	Season	Developed by	Released	Pedigree	Notes
Alba		Early Season	New Fruits s.a.s., Italy	2002		
Albion		Day neutral	University of California	2006	Diamante × Cal 94.16-1	The variety Albion is known for its large to very large fruit. Fruit is mostly conical, very firm and red in color. Its flavor is very good for a day-neutral and is sweet and pleasant. It is a high yielding cultivar with robust runners and stalks. It is resistant to verticillium wilt, phytophthora crown rot and has some resistance to anthracnose crown rot.
Alice		Midseason	East Malling Research, U.K.	1993		
Alinta		Day neutral				
Allstar		Midseason	USDA / University of Maryland	1981	US 4419 × MDVS 3184	The variety Allstar, with an almost perfect strawberry shape, is a major variety during the late mid-season. The glossy firm fruit, which holds its size very well, is an excellent u-pick or home garden choice. Its orange/red color and delicate skin lessens its shipping potential. Allstar's vigor and resistance to red stele, verticillium wilt, moderate resistance to powdery mildew and leaf scorch, makes it suitable to almost any growing region and soil condition.
Altess		Everbearing	Flevo Berry Holding B.V.	2015		The variety Altess is an everbearing variety which growers and consumers strongly appreciate. It is an easy growing variety which combines a good taste, yield and fruit size. It brings beautiful good tasting berries which maintain their gloss after storage. Plants are easy to grow and tolerate root and leaf diseases. In practice it is noticed the variety can stand flower thrips and botrytis relatively well. The variety can also stand some rain.
Amelia		Late Season	East Malling Research, U.K.	1998		
Annapolis		Early Season	AAFC, Nova Scotia, Breeder Andrew R. Jamieson	1984	K74-5 (Micmac × Raritan) × Earliglow	An early-season, productive cultivar introduced by Agriculture Canada, Kentville, Nova Scotia. The berries are large, firm, medium red and glossy with good flavor. Annapolis is good as a frozen pack. Plants runner freely and are vigorous, winter-hardy, susceptible to mildew but tolerant to red stele. The cultivar is recommended for limited early production for pick-your-own sales and the fresh market.
Apollo			USDA, North Carolina	1970	N.C.1759 × N.C.1729	
Archer		Midseason	Cornell/NYSAES	2016		Very aromatic, delicious flavor; High yield; cold-hardy; Tolerant to root rots. Holds large fruit size through multiple harvests for 2–3 weeks. Maximum fruit size can be above 45 g (1.6 oz) (comparable to plum fruit). Suited for growers in New York, Michigan and Minnesota, and along the Mid-Atlantic from Maryland into the Northeast. The 43rd strawberry released by the NYSAES breeding program since its founding in 1880.
Aromel						
Aromas		Day neutral	University of California	1994	Cal 87.112-6 × Cal 88.270-1	The variety Aromas is a day-neutral cultivar which has larger fruit and produces greater yields than Selva or Seascape. Aromas produces large quantities of late-season fruit. It also has a broader environmental tolerance and is more resistant to mildew than Selva, and is especially tolerant to spider mites. Flavor is very good. Fruit size and cull rate is superior to Selva.
Asia		Early Midseason	New Fruits s.a.s., Italy	2005		
Atlas			USDA, North Carolina	1970	NC 1759 × Albritton	
Benicia						
Benton		Late-midseason	USDA-ARS, Oregon	1975	OSC 2414 × Vale	The variety Benton is a Junebearing cultivar, named after Benton County where Oregon State University is located in Corvallis, Oregon. Fruit is very bright, has excellent keeping quality, is conic in shape, and the fruit has good flavor. Fruit is medium to large in size and is recommended for all parts of the Pacific Northwest. Benton appears to have excellent winter hardiness and excellent fruit quality with vigorous growth. The upright habit makes Benton a good bet for home gardeners as well as the commercial grower. It is more drought resistant than Rainier. Virus tolerant. Also tolerant to red stele. Ripens late.
Bogota			Netherlands	1978	(Climax × Deutsch Evern) × Tago Zb.53.116 × Tago	
Bolero		Everbearing	East Malling Research, U.K.	1996	Selva × LA 988 (complex pedigree involving Redgauntlet, Wiltguard, Gorella, Cardinal and Selva)	
Bountiful			USDA-ARS Corvallis OR	1993	Linn × Totem	
Brunswick		Early Midseason	USDA, Massachusetts	1999	Cavendish × 'Honeoye'	
Cabot		Midseason	AAFC, Nova Scotia	1998	(Elsanta × K79-5) × (ArKing × K7-40)	
Calypso		Everbearing	East Malling Research, U.K.	1992	Rapella × Selva	
Camarosa		Early-season short day	University of California	1994	Douglas (U.S. Plant Pat. No. 4,487) × advanced selection Cal 85.218-605	The variety Camarosa is an early-season short day cultivar. Fruit is larger and firmer than Chandler, very flat conic, productive, has good appearance, is very firm, has good flavor, and is widely adapted producing fruit over an extended period at low latitudes. Can be used for fresh-market and processing.
Cambridge Favourite		Early Season	University of Cambridge	1947	Fragaria Chiloensis × Blakemore	
Camino Real		Short day	University of California		Cal 89.230-7 × Cal 90.253-3	Camino Real plants are smaller and more compact, open, and erect, but less vigorous than Camarosa. Fruit is larger and per-plant yields are somewhat greater than Camarosa, but fruiting begins somewhat later. External and internal fruit color for Camino Real is darker than Camarosa. Camino Real has very good flavor and is outstanding for both fresh market and processing. Moderately susceptible to common leaf spot and somewhat sensitive to powdery mildew, resistant to Verticillium wilt and Phytophthora crown rot, and relatively resistant to Anthracnose crown rot.
Canoga		Late midseason	Cornell/NYSAES	1979	NY1123 'Senga Sengana' × 'Midland') × Holiday	
Cassandra		Midseason	East Malling Research, U.K.	1998		
Cavendish		Midseason	AAFC, Nova Scotia, Breeder Andrew R. Jamieson	1990	Glooscap × Annapolis	The variety Cavendish is a high yielding cultivar with red stele and verticillium resistance and black root rot tolerance. It is very winter-hardy and produces very large, high-quality berries which are excellent for all uses. The flavor is sweet and less tart than Honeoye. Ripens mid-season.
Chambly		Midseason	AAFC/McGill University, Breeder Shahrokh Khanizadeh	1982	Sparkle × Honeoye	High-yield, June-bearing cross between Honeoye and Sparkle. Produced by Agriculture Canada and McGill University for specific conditions of southern Quebec, including high resilience to the region's traditionally extremely cold winters.
Chandler			University of California	1983	Douglas × Cal 72.361-105	The variety Chandler is a high yielding variety, produces very large fruit, and appears to be well adapted to southern regions. It is adaptable to the eastern US, and in many different production systems including matted rows.
Christine						
Clancy		Late midseason	Cornell/NYSAES	1993	MDUS4774 × MDUS5199	
Darselect		Early midseason	Societe Civile Darbonne, France	1998	Parker × 'Elsanta'	
Delia		Early midseason	East Malling Research, U.K.	2007	Honeoye × ITA 80-51-1	
Delite			USDA, Illinois	1974	Albritton × MDUS 2650	
Delmarvel			USDA, Maryland	1994	Earliglow × Atlas	
Diamante		Day neutral	University of California	1991	Cal 87.112-6 × Cal 88.270-1	
Earlibelle			USDA, North Carolina	1964	Albritton × MDUS 2101	
Earliglow		Early Season	USDA, Maryland	1975	MDUS 2359 (Fairland × Midland) × MDUS 2713 (Redglow × Surecrop)	Earliglow is an early producing, medium-sized berry, with great flavor. The size decreases greatly as the season progresses, making it difficult for u-pick farms to sell the later fruit. The plant is vigorous, is resistant to red stele and moderately resistant to verticillium wilt.
Elegance		Late season	East Malling Research, U.K.	2009	EM834 × EM1033	
Elsanta		Midseason	Institute for Horticultural Plant Breeding, Netherlands	1975	Gorella × Holiday	
Elvira			Netherlands		(Gorella × Vola (Bowa × Empire)	
Emily		Early season	East Malling Research, U.K.	1995	Honeoye × Gea	
Eros		Midseason	East Malling Research, U.K.	1985	Allstar × Elsanta	
Evangeline		Early season	AAFC, Nova Scotia	1975	(Honeoye × Veestar) × NYUS119	
Everest			Edward Vinson Ltd., UK		Evita × Irvine	
Evie 2		Day neutral	Edward Vinson Ltd., UK	2006	Everglade × J92D12	
Faith		Late	Flevo Berry Holding B.V.	2014		Faith is a late variety with beautiful, bright fruit and an excellent flavour.
Favori		Everbearing	Flevo Berry Holding B.V.	2013	Mara des Bois × Flevo 01-77-11	Favori is an everbearing variety with excellent characteristics. The quality and yield of Favori are very good. Favori is a fast grower, meaning that the variety comes into production early. The fruit are conical and elongated in shape and have the Elsanta colour, which, just as the shine, is also preserved during storage.
Fenella		Late season	East Malling Research, U.K.	2009	EM931 × EM972	
Firecracker		Late Season	USDA-ARS, Corvallis, OR	1998	ORUS 850-48 (Linn × ORUS 3727) × Totem	
Flair		Early	Flevo Berry Holding B.V.	2008		Flair is the variety with which many growers start the season, as it is early-cropping with good flavour, even under cold conditions.
Flamenco		Everbearer	East Malling Research, U.K.	2002	Evita × EMR77 (The male parent is from crosses involving Selva, Tioga, Gorella and Gento)	
Fleurette		Early	Flevo Berry Holding B.V.	2013		Fleurette is 7 days earlier than Elsanta and can be forced quite easily using a double covering. Fleurette combines earliness, productivity and excellent fruit quality
Florence		Late midseason	East Malling Research, U.K.	1997	[Tioga × ('Redgauntlet' × (Wiltguard × Gorella))] × (Providence × self)	
Florentina		Everbearing	Flevo Berry Holding B.V.	2011		Florentina is an everbearing variety with excellent characteristics. The fruit are firm in texture, conical in shape and Elsanta-red. The variety has no susceptibility to finger bruising and the fruit remain glossy even after storage.
Florina		Everbearing	Flevo Berry Holding B.V.	2010		Florina is an everbearer with excellent characteristics. Florinas vigorous growth produces a high yield. It develops quickly and starts production early. In the right growing conditions, it is even possible to harvest from the winter flowers as early as May/June. The colour of the fruit is similar to that of Elsanta and will not darken during storage. The fruit are conical in shape and the brightness of the colour remains even after harvesting.
Fort Laramie			USDA, Wyoming	1973	Geneva × S.65122 (Earlidawn × Chief Bemidji)	Fort Laramie is extremely winter hardy, and does well in colder areas except Alaska (Alaska's long days inhibit fruit production). Also not recommended in the South. Large, bright scarlet fruit with dark pink to scarlet interior. Firm sweet flesh is exceptionally aromatic. Good for eating fresh, freezing and preserves. Vigorous; produces many runners and a very heavy crop. Somewhat susceptible to mildew.
Frel (Pink Panda)					Fragaria × Comarum hybrid involving Fragaria chiloensis	Pink flowers; few fruit
Fruitful Summer						
Furore		Everbearing	Flevo Berry Holding B.V.	2014		Furore is an everbearing variety with excellent characteristics. The quality and yield of the Furore are very good and can be used in many forms of cultivation. Furore is a fast grower, which means that the variety comes into production early. The fruit are conical and elongated in shape and have a bright red colour, which, just as the shine, also remains well preserved during storage.
Gaviota			University of California	1998	Cal 87.112-6 × Cal 88.270-1	
Glooscap		Early midseason	AAFC, Nova Scotia	1983	Mic Mac × Bounty	
Governor Simcoe		Late midseason	HRIO	1985	Guardian × Holiday	
Guardian			USDA, Maryland	1969	NC 1768 × Surecrop	
Hapil				1977	Gorella × Souvenir de Charles Machiroux	Raised in Belgium
Hecker		Day neutral	University of California	1979	CA 69.96-101 × CA 65.65-601 third backcross derivative from male collected in Wasatch Mountains near Salt Lake City, Utah	Hecker has commercial potential for fruit stands and Pick-Your-Own operations due to heavy production. It should perform well everywhere, including Alaska, as it is a day-neutral cultivar. Fruit is medium size with excellent flavor. Similar to Brighton, but more cold hardy.
Hokowase		Early season	Hyogo Prefecture, Japan	1960		
Honeoye		Early midseason	Cornell/NYSAES	1979	Vibrant × Holiday	Honeoye is an early season cultivar with moderately-sized, relatively firm, bright fruit with consistent size throughout the season. Very high yields. Somewhat sensitive to Sinbar. Susceptible to black root rot. It is widely adapted, but exhibits best flavor when grown on lighter soils or in raised beds.
Hood		Midseason	George F. Waldo USDA-ARS/Oregon State	1965	OSC 2315 × Puget Beauty	Standard for use in premium ice cream in the Pacific Northwest, US strawberry plant has large, bright, glossy red fruit turning dark when fully ripe. Fine, sweet flavor, excellent fruit quality. Excellent for preserves and jams, good for all other uses. Vigorous, very productive, erect plants make picking easy. Resistant to root rot and mildew; is susceptible to red stele but still performs better than Northwest on red stele-infested soil. Bears entire crop over a short period. Popular home market variety. Ripens in early June. Not particularly winter hardy.
Itasca		Early midseason	USDA/University of Minnesota	2005	Allstar × Seneca	Itasca is resistant to red-stele and its foliage is highly resistant to mildew.
Jewel		Late midseason	Cornell/NYSAES	1985	('Senga Sengana' × NYE58) × Holiday	Jewel cultivar is good for u-pick, fresh shipping and longer season yields. Produces large, firm, wedge-shaped fruit of excellent color and quality. Its firmness and abrasive resistant skin makes it less susceptible to fruit rots and ideal for shipping.
Joliette		Midseason	AAFC, Breeder Shahrokh Khanizadeh	1996	'SJ85189' (Redchief x Surecrop')× Jewel)	Joliette is good for u-pick and mechanical harvesting
Judibell		Very late season	East Malling Research, U.K.	2005		
Kent		Midseason	AAFC, Nova Scotia	1981	('Redgauntlet' × Tioga) × Raritan	Kent is a winter-hardy cultivar from Canada with high yield potential producing large, good quality berries. Excellent for all seasons and above average flavor. Kent has very good plant vigor, but has no resistance to red stele or verticillium wilt.
L'Amour		Midseason	Cornell / NYSAES	2003	(MDUS5252 × Etna) × Cavendish	Heart shaped berries with bright red color and a fancy calyx, which makes them very attractive. Berries are bright red and firm but not hard, with excellent eating quality and flavor. The plants are vigorous and disease resistant and remain productive for many years. The fruit is larger than most early season varieties.
Little Scarlet			England, U.K.	Cultivar grown since the sixteen hundreds		
Loran						
Lucy		Late midseason	East Malling Research, U.K.	2009		
Lumina		Early season	USDA-ARS, Beltsville, MD	2024		High yields, and relatively resistant to foliar diseases like anthracnose fruit rot.
Mae		Early midseason	East Malling Research, U.K.	2003	Rosie × Marmolada	
Mahabaleshwar						
Malling Opal						
Malling Pearl						
Marshall		Early midseason	Marshall F. Ewell, Massachusetts	1890		Marshall was found as a seedling just a short distance south of Boston, Mass., and introduced in 1893. Midseason. For over fifty years Marshall was the standard of flavor in the Pacific Northwest and even in 1962 it was the seventh most grown, but only in the Northwest. Its excellent flavor, large size, freezing quality and its drought resistance made it important. Limitations: it is not firm, and is being replaced because of its susceptibility to virus diseases and to leaf spot and its only moderate yields.
Matis		Midseason	Jacques Marionnet GFA, France	2003		
Mesabi		Midseason	University of Minnesota and the USDA-ARS	1996	Glooscap × MNUS 99	Mesabi should be a mid-season winner for growers in northern areas, as it rarely shows winter damage in Minnesota, where it was developed. Mesabi produces large, firm berries that are red all the way through with excellent flavor. Plants are very winter hardy and show excellent disease and red stele root rot resistance.
Midway			USDA, Maryland	1959	Dixieland × Temple	
Mira		Midseason	AAFC, Nova Scotia	1996	Scott × Honeoye	
Mohawk		Early Season	USDA, Maryland	1994	MDUS 4587 × Earliglow	
Mojave						
Monterey		Day neutral	University of California	2009	Albion × Cal 97.85-6	Monterey is a moderate day-neutral cultivar. Vigorous plant, may require slightly more space than Albion with similar production pattern. Fruit is slightly larger than Albion, but less firm. Outstanding flavor. good disease resistance profile, although it is susceptible to powdery mildew
Northeaster		Early season	USDA, New Jersey	1993	MDUS 4380 × Holiday	Early-season, disease-resistant June bearing strawberry cultivar.
Northeastern		Early season	USDA	1993	Mdus 4380 × Holiday	
Ogallala		Everbearing	USDA, Wyoming	1956	(Rockhill × Cheyenne 3) × (Midland × Cheyenne 2)	Berries are soft, medium in size and dark red. Sweet, good flavor. Berries ripen early. Plants are vigorous, hardy during winter. Resistant to leaf spot and resistant to drought.
Orléans		Early season	Les Fraises de l'Île d'Orléans, Québec, Canada	2001		
Oso Grande		Early season, short-day	University of California	1987	Parker × (Tioga × Pajaro hybrid)	Exceptionally high yield of very large fruit, firmness and particularly fine flavor.
Ozark Beauty		Everbearing	J.B. Winn, Arkansas	1955	Red Rich × Twentieth Century	Developed in Arkansas. One of the hardiest, most vigorous, heaviest-producing everbearing strawberries. Cold hardy. Ripens in early summer and continues to fruit until first frost. Self-pollinating.
Palomar			University of California			
Pandora		Late season	East Malling Research, U.K.	1988	(Von Humboldt × Redstar) × 'Merton Dawn'	
Pegasus			USDA, England, U.K.	1990	Redgauntlet × Gorella	Pegasus (formerly ES608) was raised in 1977 from the cross Redgauntlet x Gorella. It was released in the UK in 1990
Pelican			Maryland, United States	1996	FL 82-1556P × LA 8311 (LA 2556 × LA 883)	
Pineberry						Pineberries are smaller than a common strawberry, measuring between 15 and 23 mm (0.6 and 0.9 in). When ripe, they are almost completely white, but with red "seeds" (achenes). The plant is disease resistant and has small berry size and low yield. It is available in the spring and summer.
Pink Panda (see 'Frel')					Fragaria × Comarum hybrid involving Fragaria chiloensis	Pink flowers; few fruit
Pinnacle		Early mid-season	USDA-ARS, Oregon	2002	Laguna × ORUS 1267-250 [Redcrest × ORUS 869-13 (WSU 1623 × Redgem)]	Pinnacle is a high-yielding, large fruited, early midseason cultivar with very high fruit quality that is most suited to the fresh market but produces a satisfactory processed product.
Portola		Day neutral	University of California	2009	Cal 97.93-7 × Cal 97.209-1	Portola is a strong day-neutral cultivar. Fruit is similar in size to Albion, but lighter in color and somewhat shinier. It has excellent flavor and a slightly earlier ripening season than Albion. It is a vigorous plant and may require a slightly lower planting density than Albion. It is somewhat less tolerant to rain than Albion.
Primetime			USDA, Maryland	1995	MDUS 4377 [Sunrise × MDUS 3082 (sibling of Redchief and Guardian)] × Earliglow	
Puget Reliance		Early mid-season	Washington State University, Oregon State University, University of Idaho, and the USDA-ARS	1994	WSU 1945 × BC 77-2-72	Puget Reliance produces high yields of large, medium-red conic fruit that is good for processing or local fresh market. It is virus tolerant. Season is similar to 'Totem'. The plant has an erect growth habit, and unripe fruit are usually held off the ground, providing some degree of avoidance to fruit rot.
Puget Summer ('Schwartze')		Late	Washington State University	2002	Nanaimo × ORUS 1076-124	Excellent flavor
Quinault		Everbearing	Washington State University	1967	WSU 901 (sibling of Nisqually) × Puget Beauty	Prefers a soil pH of 5.3 to 6.5. When Quinault plants reach maturity they will attain a height of 8 to 12 in (200 to 300 mm) and spread will be about 12 inches. Will produce berries on unrooted runners. Berries are large to very large, round to round conic. Soft, bright red in color, sweet fruit. Produces from late spring through fall. Quinault was found to be the most disease-free everbearer ever tested. Self pollinating.
Rabunda			Netherlands	1969	Redgauntlet x Repita	
Rainier		Late season	Washington State University	1972	WSU 685(Northwest × Sierra) × Columbia sister seedling of Shuksan	Rainier is a full sibling of Shuksan, and a late season cultivar with good-flavored, large fruit. Yields are intermediate. It is not suited for the processing market as it does not cap well, but makes a good addition for local fresh sales. It is tolerant to powdery mildew and red stele.
Redchief			USDA, Maryland	1968	NC 1768 × Surecrop	
Redcrest		late season	USDA-ARS, Oregon	1990	Linn(MDUS 3184 × ORUS 2414) × Totem	
Redgauntlet			Scotland, U.K.		NJ 1051 × Auchincruive Climax × New Jersey 1051	Resistant to some races of red core root rot. Moderate to heavy cropper, good berry size
Redgem			USDA-ARS, Oregon	1993	Benton x ORUS 3596 (Earlibelle x ORUS 2853)	
Red Ruby ('Samba')					Fragaria × Comarum hybrid involving Fragaria chiloensis	Red flowers; few fruit
Rhapsody						
Rosie		Early midseason	East Malling Research, U.K.	1999		
Roxana		Late season	New Fruits s.a.s., Italy	2001		
Royal Sovereign		Mid-season	Thomas Laxton, England, U.K.	1891	Noble × King of the Earliest	'Royal Sovereign', like many older cultivars, has a softer texture than most modern varieties. The flesh is bright orange-pink to scarlet. The cultivar is high in juice and is very sweet in taste. Plants typically produce around 7–12 oz (200–340 g) of fruit per plant.
Sable		Early season	USDA	1998	Veestar × Cavendish	
Saint Pierre		Midseason	AAFC, Breeder Shahrokh Khanizadeh	2001	Chandler × Jewel	
Sallybright		Midseason	East Malling Research, U.K.	2007		
Samba (see Red Ruby)					Fragaria × Comarum hybrid involving Fragaria chiloensis	Red flowers; few fruit
San Andrés		Day neutral	University of California	2009	Albion × Cal 97.86-1	The variety San Andreas is a moderate day-neutral with a production pattern similar to Albion. It has high quality fruit, outstanding flavor, exceptional appearance, and is especially superior to Albion in the early season. Fruit color is slightly lighter than Albion.
Sapphire		Midseason	University of Guelph	2002	319A92 × V7737-2	
Sasha		June bearer	East Malling Research, U.K.			
Scott		Midseason	USDA, Maryland	1979	Sunrise × Tioga	Named for strawberry breeder Dr. Donald H. Scott.
Seascape		Day neutral	University of California	1991	Selva × Douglas	Seascape produces very large, firm fruit which have good color and flavor when picked ripe. They have a symmetric, medium to long conical berry with a glossy finish. This variety is highly tolerant of the virus diseases common in California, and is moderately susceptible to leaf rot.
Seneca		Midseason	Cornell/NYSAES	1992	NY 1261 (Redcoat × NY 844) × Holiday	Fruit large to medium, drops in size, roundish, necked, very light red, soft, mild flavor
Senga Sengana			Germany	1954	Markee × Sieger	
Sequoia		Everbearing	University of California	1972	CAL 52.16-15 (a sister of Wiltguard and only parent of Aliso) × CAL 51s1-1 (selected from a first generation selfed population of Lassen)	Medium height plants that develop vigorous runners. Large, glossy berries with a long conic shape. Flavor is sweet and subacid with pleasing aromatic qualities. Disease-resistant to leaf spot. Cold hardy. Ripens in June and may bear into fall. Self-pollinating.
Shuksan		Short day	Washington State University	1970	(Northwest × Sierra) × Columbia	The variety Shuksan has large, glossy bright red fruit with slightly indented yellowish red seeds. Fruit has medium-firm flesh with good flavor. It is good for fresh eating and excellent for freezing and preserves. Plant is large, very vigorous, and produces runners freely. It is virus and Botrytis tolerant and red stele resistant. Does not demand perfect drainage.
Sonata		Mid-season				
Sophie		Late season	East Malling Research, U.K.	1997	NY1261 × Holiday	
Stellarossa		Late season	Cincinnati	2005	OH366 × Floreat	Small plants that develop numerous runners. Medium, deep-red berries with a wedge shape. Flavor is sweet. Cold hardy. Ripens in August and bears well into fall. Self-pollinating.
Strasberry			Otto Schindler, DE	1925	Fragaria × ananassa 'Mieze Schindler'	Has a raspberry-like appearance. Produces no fertile pollen and will need a pollinator. Reintroduced as a commercial variety in the twenty-first century. Since 2013 a hybrid self-pollinating version of this strawberry has been marketed under the new trade name Framberry.
Strawberry Festival		Short day	Florida Agricultural Experimentation Station	2000	Rosa Linda × Oso Grande	Strawberry Festival is distinguished by the numerous runners it produces in the fruiting field, the long pedicels attached to its fruit, and the production of fruit that are flavorful, firm fleshed, deep red on the outside, bright red on the inside, and conically shaped.
Sunrise			USDA, Maryland	1964	USMD 4152 × Stelemaster	
Surecrop		Short day	USDA-ARS and the Maryland Agricultural Experimentation Station	1956	Fairland × Mdus 1972	Surecrop is a favorite of home gardeners because its vigorous growth habits make it easy to grow and produce good crops in almost any region or soil type. Resistant to red stele. Firm, solid fruit make it good for fresh use or the freezer.
Sussette		Late	Flevo Berry Holding B.V.	2013		The Sussette variety is a late, short-day variety with light red coloured fruit and an excellent flavour.
Symphony		Late season	Bred at the James Hutton Institute (JHI) (formerly SCRI), Scotland, U.K.	1993	Rhapsody × Holiday	Excellent appearance and good slightly acidic flavour, Mildew and red core resistance, follows on from Elsanta
Tillamook		Early mid-season	USDA-ARS, Oregon Agricultural Experimentation Station, Washington State University Agricultural Research Center, and Idaho Agricultural Experimentation Station	2002	Cuesta × Puget Reliance	Tillamook is a high yielding cultivar, with an extremely large fruit size that is maintained throughout the season. The large fruit size combined with an open plant habit make it extremely efficient to pick. Fruit are extremely firm, cap easily, and have excellent flavor, but color is somewhat light compared to other Pacific Northwest cultivars. Ripens slightly earlier than 'Totem'.
Titan			USDA, North Carolina	1971	NC 1767 × Albritton	
Totem		Mid-season	Agriculture and Agri-Foods Canada, BC	1972	Puget Beauty × Northwest	Standard processing cultivar for the Pacific Northwest US strawberry plant produces relatively firm, conic fruit, which has a uniform, intense medium to dark red internal and external color. Excellent for processing. Totem plants have the potential to produce high yields (5–8 tons/acre) in the Pacific Northwest. Totem is resistant to some strains of red stele, verticillium wilt, leaf spot, and powdery mildew.
Tribute		Day neutral	Maryland Agricultural Experimentation Station and the USDA-ARS	1981	EB 18 (MdUS 3082 × Cal 65.65-601) × MdUS 4258 (MdUS 2713 × MdUS 3364)	Tribute is a day neutral cultivar with medium-sized, firm fruit. It is one of the most popular eastern day neutral cultivars and performs well in commercial plantings. Resistant to red stele and powdery mildew and partially resistant to verticillium wilt and leaf scorch. Full sibling to Tristar.
Tristar		Day neutral	Maryland Agricultural Experimentation Station and the USDA-ARS	1981	EB 18 (MdUS 3082 × Cal 65.65-601) × MdUS 4258 (MdUS 2713 × MdUS 3364)	Tristar produces medium to small flavorful fruit and is a favorite of home gardeners who desire good dessert quality berries all season long. Tristar yield peaks slightly earlier than Tribute. It is resistant to red stele and powdery mildew and partially resistant to verticillium wilt and leaf scorch. Full sibling to Tribute.
Valley Red		Early mid-season	USDA-ARS, Oregon	2009	Anaheim × Puget Reliance	Processing cultivar
Variegata						Variegated foliage; few fruit
Veestar		Early season	HIRO, Ontario, Canada	1967	Valentine × Sparkle	
Ventana			University of California			
Viktoriana		Late midseason	East Malling Research, U.K.	1998		
Wendy		Early season	AAFC	2006	(Sable × K91-2) × Evangeline	
Winona		Late season	University of Minnesota/USDA-ARS, Beltsville, MD	1995	Earliglow × MNUS 52 (Lateglow × MDUS 4616)	
AC-Yamaska		Late season	AAFC, Breeder Shahrokh Khanizadeh	2001	Pandora × Bogota	A June-bearing strawberry cultivar bred for eastern central Canada and more specifically for Quebec growing conditions. The fruits are very large, dark red and glossy
