= Strawberry cultivation in California =

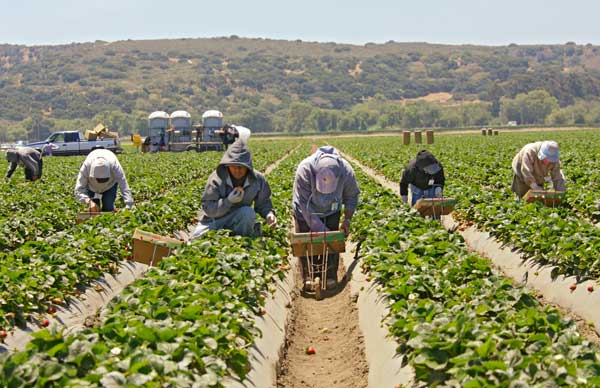

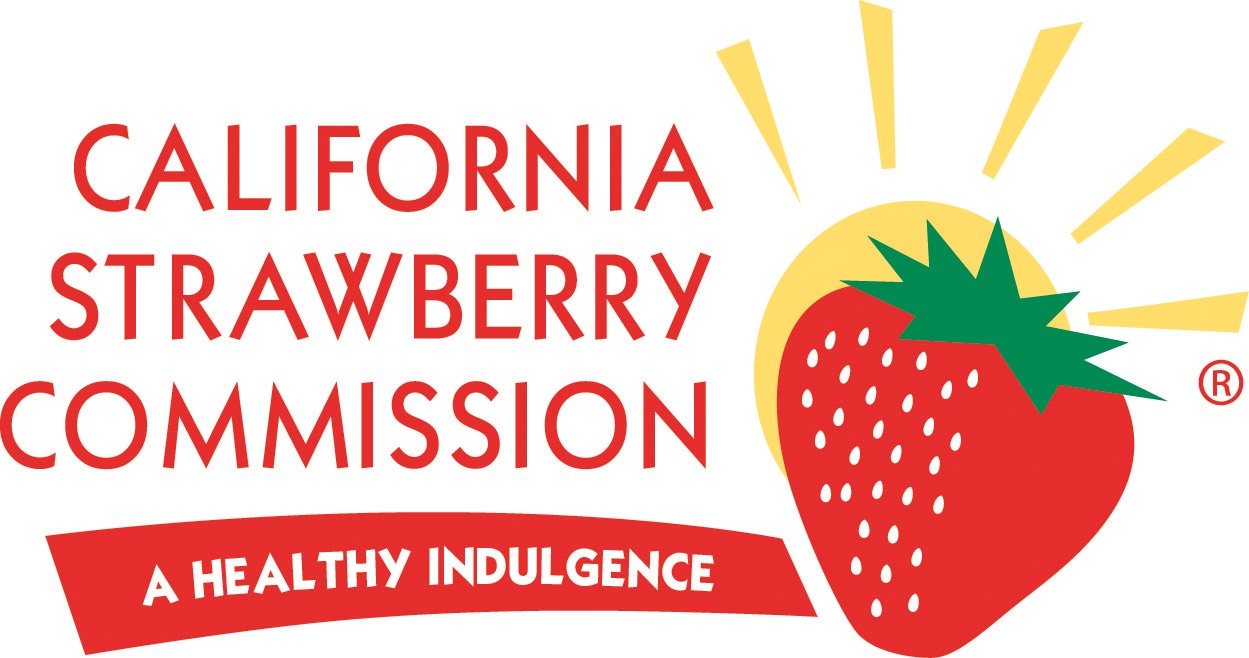

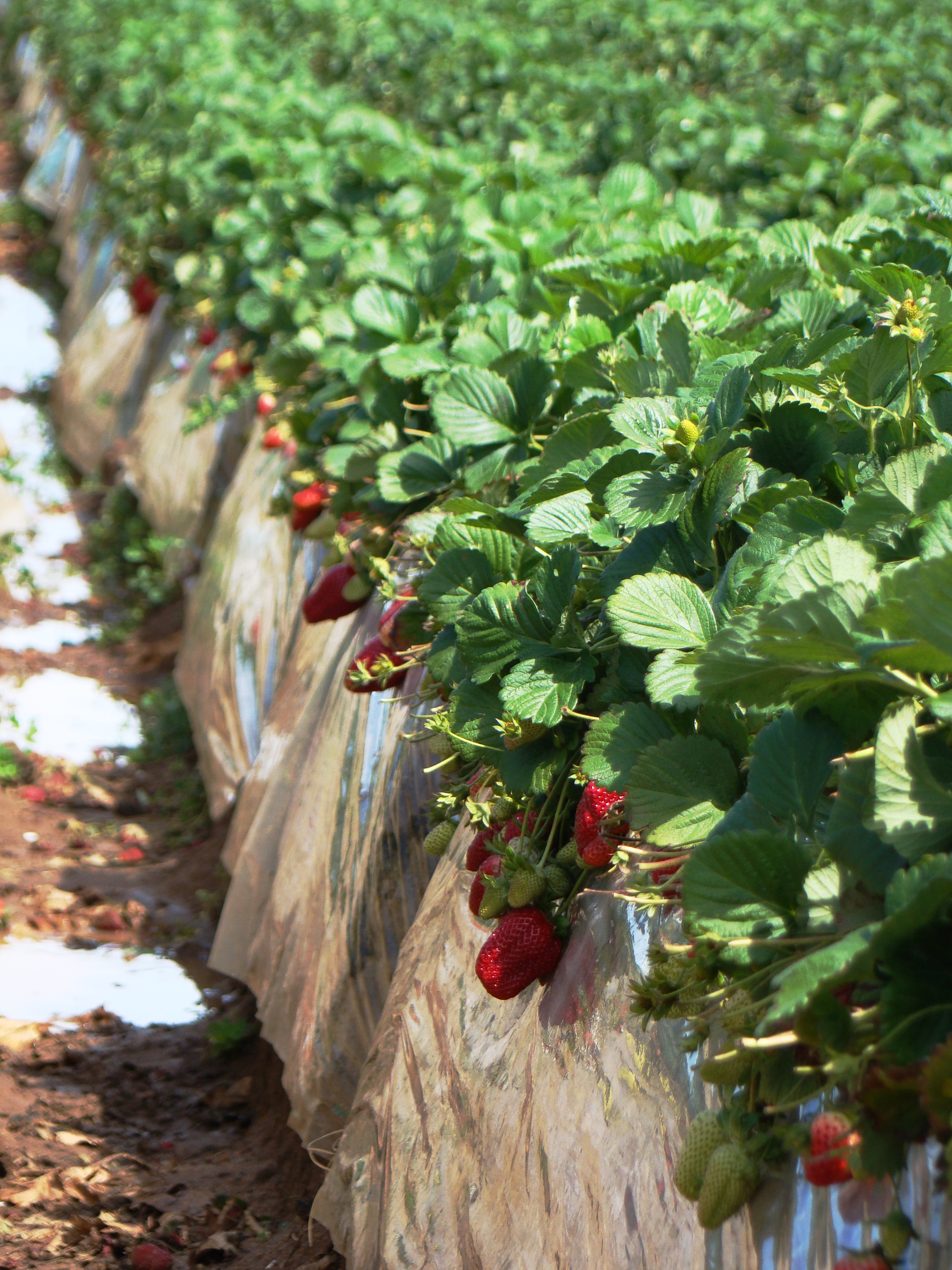
Carlsbad

Strawberries (Fragaria × ananassa) in the United States are almost entirely grown in California – 86% of fresh and 98% of frozen in 2017 – with Florida a distant second. Of that 30.0% was from Monterey, 28.6% from Ventura, 20.0% from Santa Barbara, 10.0% from San Luis Obispo, and 9.2% from Santa Cruz. The Watsonville/Salinas strawberry zone in Santa Cruz/Monterey, and the Oxnard zone in Ventura, contribute heavily to those concentrations.

Production has risen steadily from 2005 when 34,300 acres (13,900 ha) were harvested through 2017 when 38,200 acres (15,500 ha) were harvested. The 2005 season's harvest sold for $1,122,834,000. The 2017 harvest sold for $3,100,215,000. As of 2023, there were 9,000 acres of certified organic strawberry grown in California, and 573 organic strawberry growers.

The California Strawberry Commission is a commodity group that advocates for strawberry growers. The CSC provides information for both growers and consumers. Some towns have annual strawberry festivals, see Strawberry festival § United States. The Driscoll's company began with strawberries here and still grows and sells here; they have since expanded to other states, countries, and types of berries.

== Economics and labor ==
Productivity routinely averages 76,500 pounds per acre (85.7 t/ha; 38.3 short ton/acre). In 2017 that resulted in a total of 1,461.2 thousand short tons (1,325.6 thousand metric tons) worth $3,100,215,000.

In 2017, growers received $1.23 per pound ($2.7/kg), which was 1.126x the average value/weight for fruits, and compared to $1.40 per pound ($3.1/kg) for Florida growers. 269.6 million pounds (122,300 metric tons; 134,800 short tons) were harvested, facing Mexican imports of 364.6 million pounds (165,400 metric tons; 182,300 short tons). Growers paid $12.60/hour on average to farmworkers. In 2005 Santa Maria was far below Oxnard and Salinas–Watsonville. By 2019 however Santa Maria had become the highest producing area in the state for both conventional and organic. In 2021 36,500 acres (14,800 ha; 148 km^{2}) were harvested, almost all from the same three longstanding areas, Oxnard, Santa Maria, and Salinas–Watsonville. This requires 1.5 workers per acre (3.7/ha) totalling 50–60,000 in the summer peak.

Even when immigration was unrestricted, strawberry growers felt in 2017 that labor supply was still too tight. Just before the 2018 deportations began, in 2017 strawberry pickers earned ~$150/day or ~$18.75/hour.

The right personal protective equipment is required for fumigant applicators and those working nearby. Practices and training and provided by the state Department of Pesticide Regulation.

The California Strawberry Scholarship Program is operated by the California Strawberry Growers' Fund. As of 2022 it has awarded over $2 million for the schooling of strawberry pickers' children. The California Table Grape Growers have a similar program.

The Borello 1988 decision classifies strawberry sharecroppers as independent contractors.

Billikopf has repeatedly (Billikopf 1999, Billikopf 2001) found that improved working conditions improve worker productivity of strawberry pickers.

Plasticulture, particularly polyethylene mulch, has been used extensively by California strawberry growers since the early 1970s. Polyethylene mulch use can contribute to plastic pollution. Even best-practice removal of this plastic has been shown to result in macro and microplastic soil contamination in California strawberry fields.

== Pest management ==
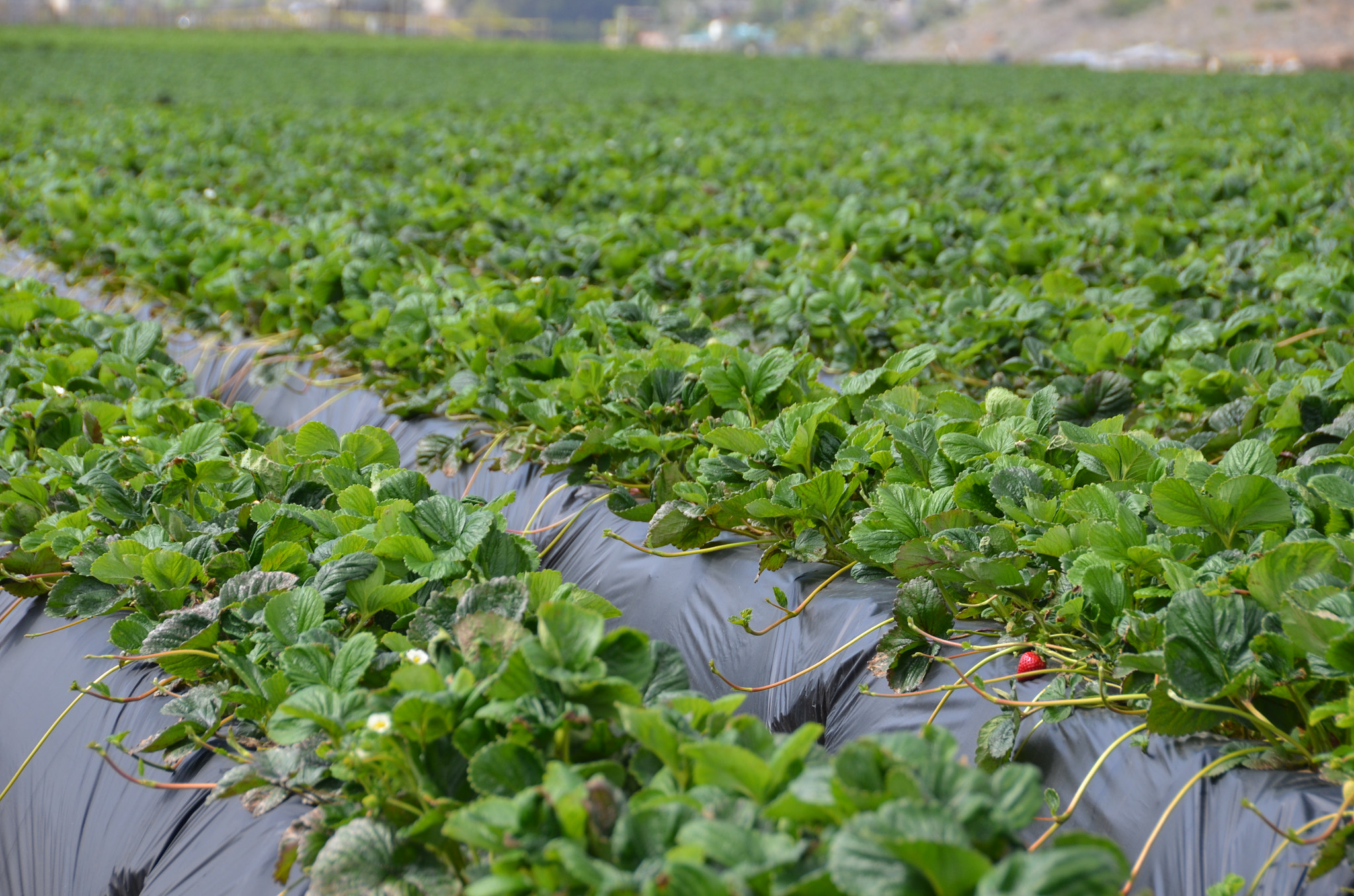
Carlsbad

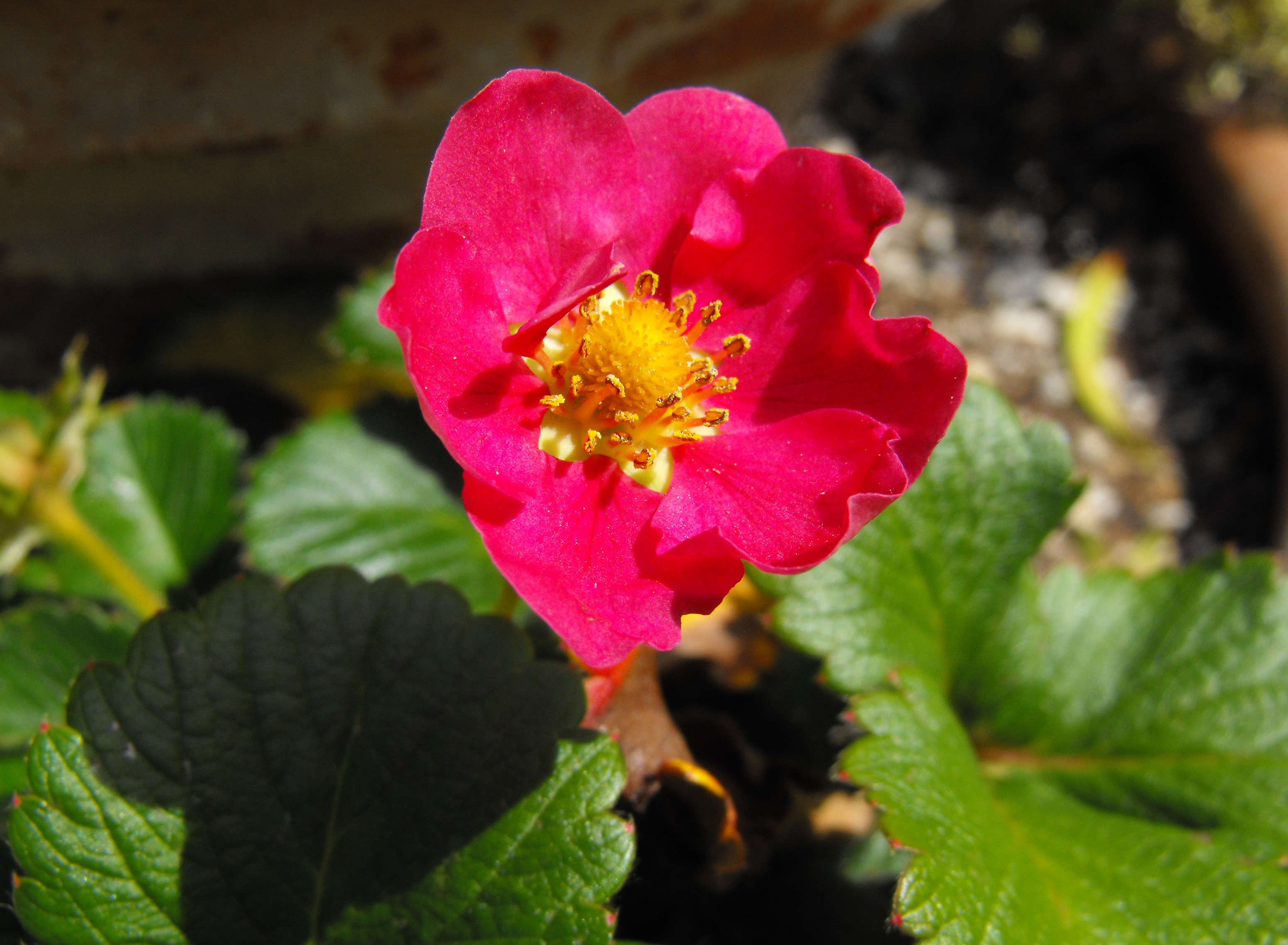
Ornamental strawberry, 'Pretty in Pink', San Diego Botanic Garden

Regional Integrated Pest Management Centers (Regional IPM Centers) hosts a suggested IPM plan for strawberry.

As of 2022 there is increasing interest and increasing progress in automated (robotic) phytopathology in this crop, especially monitoring for insects and UV-C application for mites.

=== Diseases ===
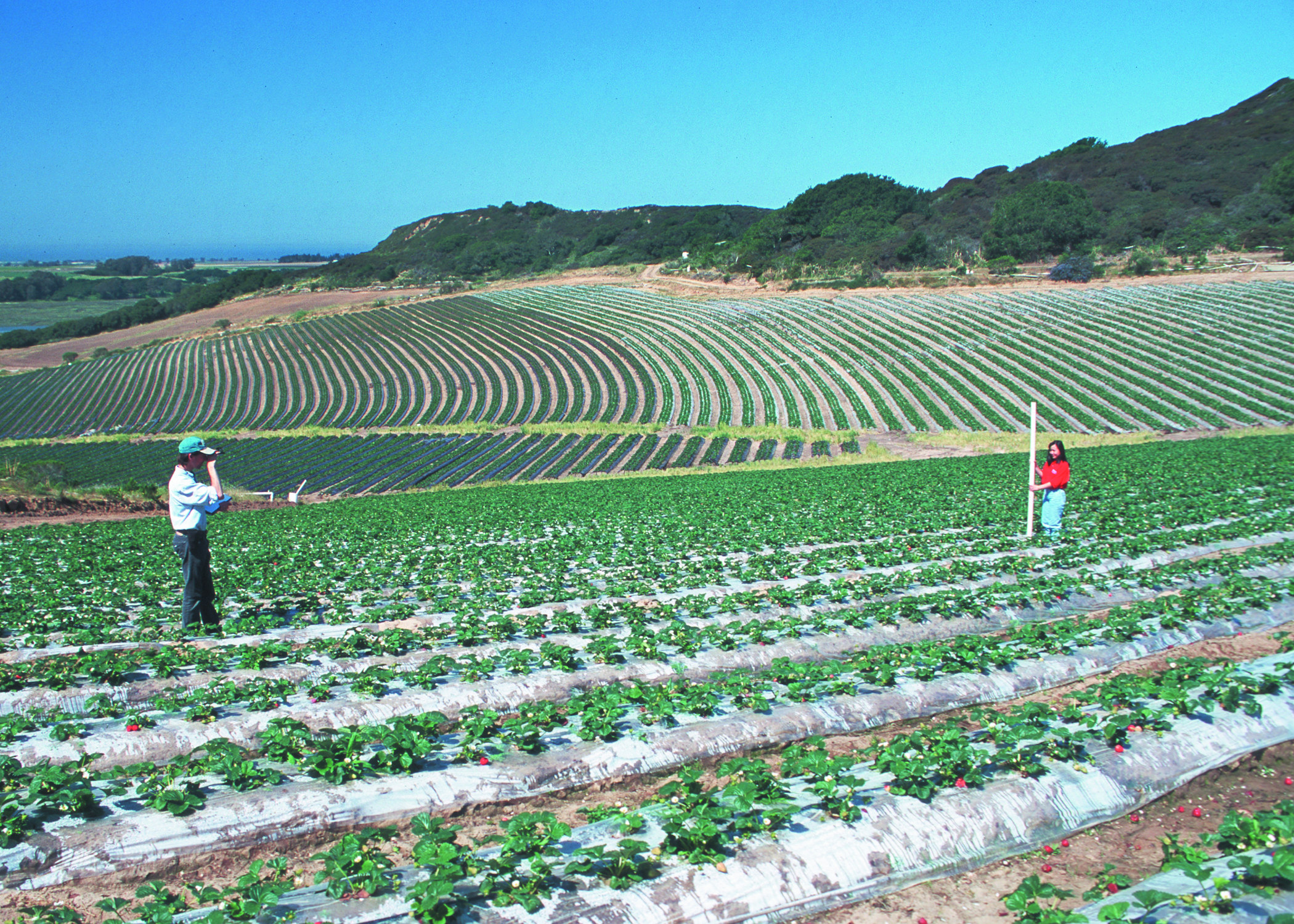
Monterey

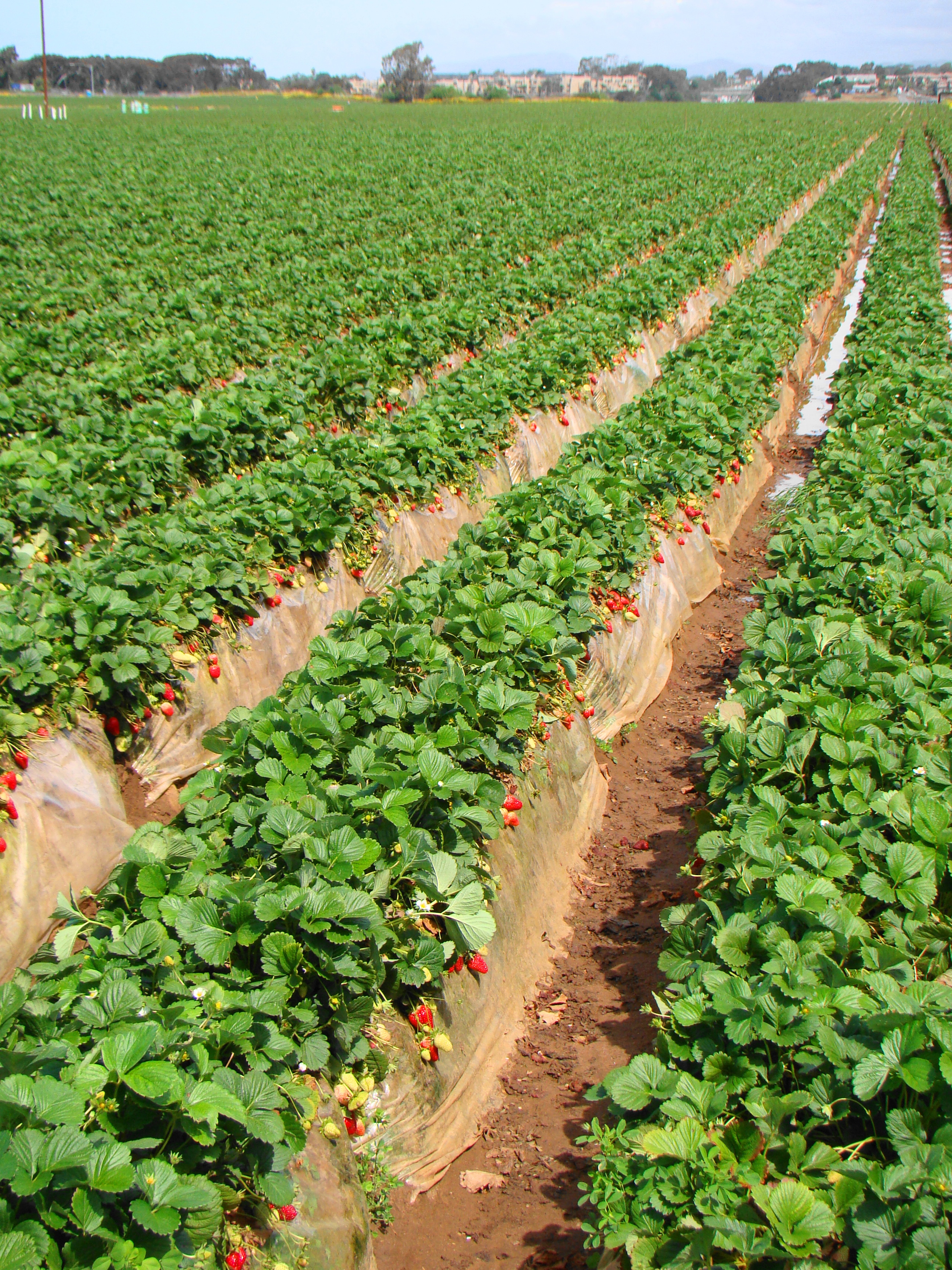
Carlsbad, 2010

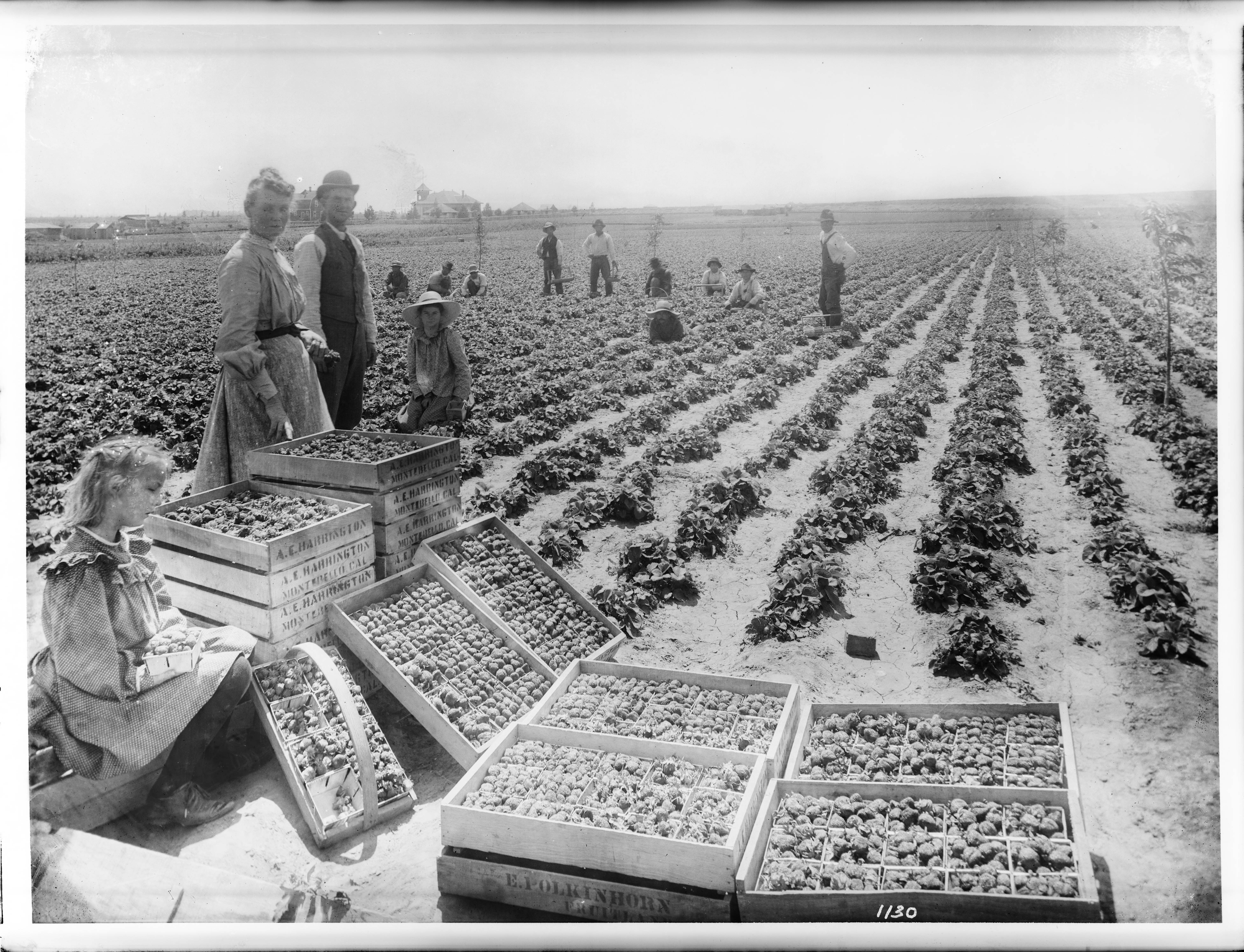
Bell, ~1910

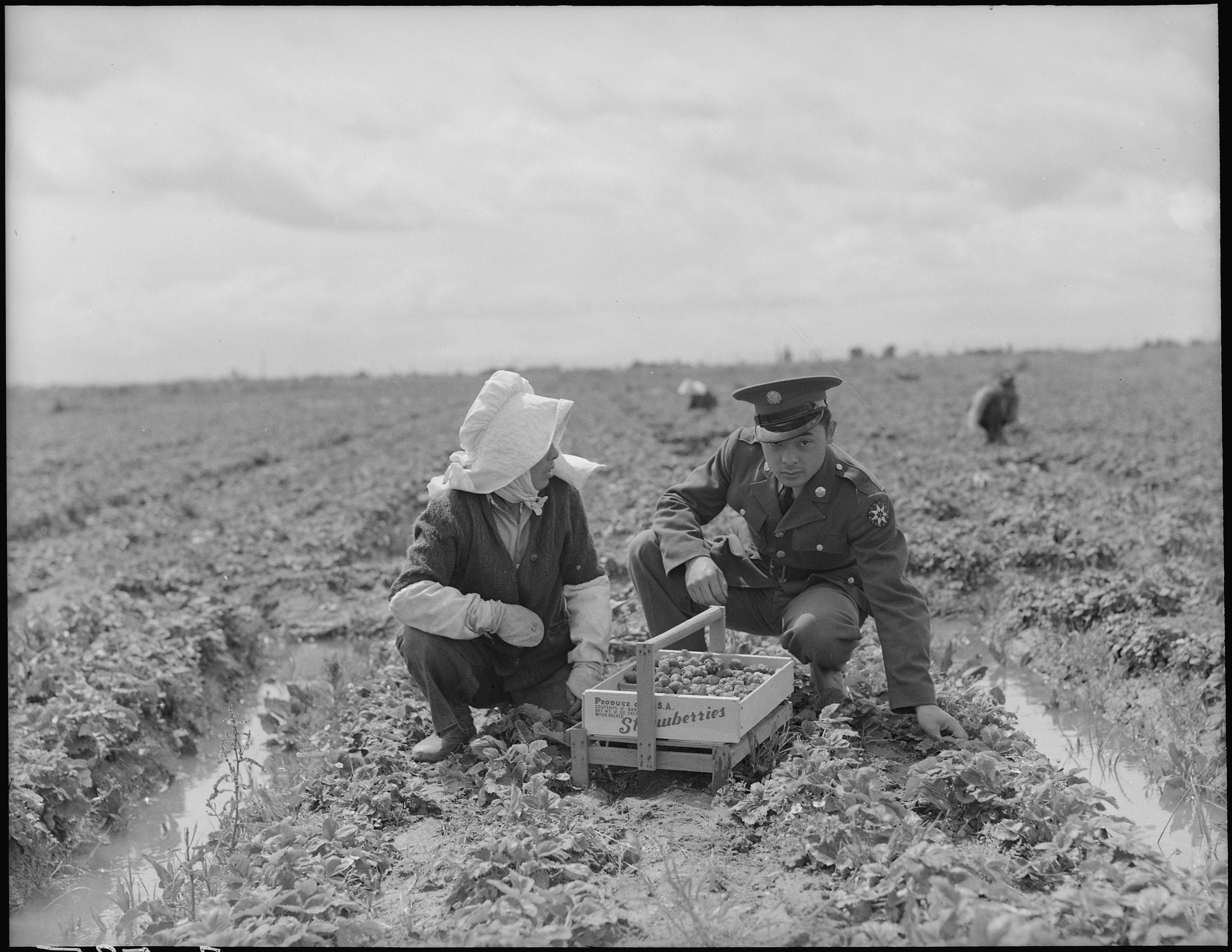
Soldier on leave to help his mother harvest, WW2

The use of soil fumigation was highly praised and widely recommended by the California Strawberry Advisory Board in 1967. Strawberry production here has been highly productive ever since but also highly dependent on fumigants. So vital was the most common fumigant – methyl bromide – that the ongoing phase out of the chemical sent growers and researchers scrambling for alternatives. One alternative specifically for nematodes is 1,3-Dichloropropene, however some of the finely textured soils in some of the state's soil regions reduce its efficacy, and as of 2010 there are restrictions in some townships on maximum rates. Soil solarization is another option. Stapleton et al., 2005 eliminate almost 100% of annual weeds in this crop with solarization alone. It completely fails against yellow nutsedge however.

Various strains of Botrytis cinerea are the most common and most impactful disease of this crop. Botrytis leaf spot was first discovered here. Conventional strawberry requires many fungicide sprays per season. Losses can commonly be 30–40% if fungicides are not competently employed, or not permitted as with organic. If lower temperatures and high rain persist unusually long, such a control failure will cost 50–60% of the yield – at this point the season is abandoned and 100% of revenue will be lost.

Strawberry crown rot is a major disease here as it is in any productive growing region. Genetic markers for CR resistance would make a significant difference in yield. Shaw et al., 2008 is a starting point for such screening, using the markers they found.

Daugovish et al., 2012 finds the introduction of drip irrigation has reduced asymptomatic Colletotrichum acutatum presence in nurseries, and thus lower anthracnose in the resulting transplants.

The only effective treatment of Fusarium Wilt may be genetic resistance. Pincot et al., 2018 tested UCD varieties for resistance and located Fw1, a dominant gene explaining almost all FW resistance. Fw1 is very likely to be a toll/interleukin-1 receptor (TIR) nucleotide-binding leucine-rich repeat (NB-LRR) gene. They also identify seven accessions which are fw1 (recessive susceptible homozygous) yet nonetheless resistant, and thus predicted to carry yet-unidentified novel genetics.

No cultivar has full resistance to powdery mildew, and the partial resistance that is available varies widely. Palmer & Holmes 2021 finds increasing resistance/declining efficacy to most of the most commonly applied ingredients, in Oxnard.

=== Pests ===
Insects are a constant concern. The Beet Armyworm (BAW, Spodoptera frugiperda) skeletonizes leaves, damages crowns, and then begins eating the berries. BAW is especially a problem of the southern and Santa Maria strawberry zones, but can damage transplant crowns anywhere in the state. Egg deposition is most often in the fall. Overwintering is possible and will produce earlier and more severe infestations. BAW is controlled by a parasitoid wasp, Hyposoter exiguae, and by Spodoptera exigua nuclear polyhedrosis virus (SeNPV) but additional control may be needed. Insecticides during transplanting are needed sometimes in the southern areas, but sometimes not due to natural controls. A good part of control relies only on weed management in the surrounding area, depriving BAW of alternate hosts. Further control may be needed using insecticides including methoxyfenozide, spinetoram, Bacillus thuringiensis subsp. kurstaki, diazinon. Organic control requires all of the non-insecticide methods (aggressive weeding, wasps, virus) plus Bacillus thuringiensis subsp. aizawai or Entrust which contains spinosad.

The Western Flower Thrips is common here. Organochlorines were used until being replaced in the 1970s by carbamates and organophosphates. See Agriculture in California § Western Flower Thrips.

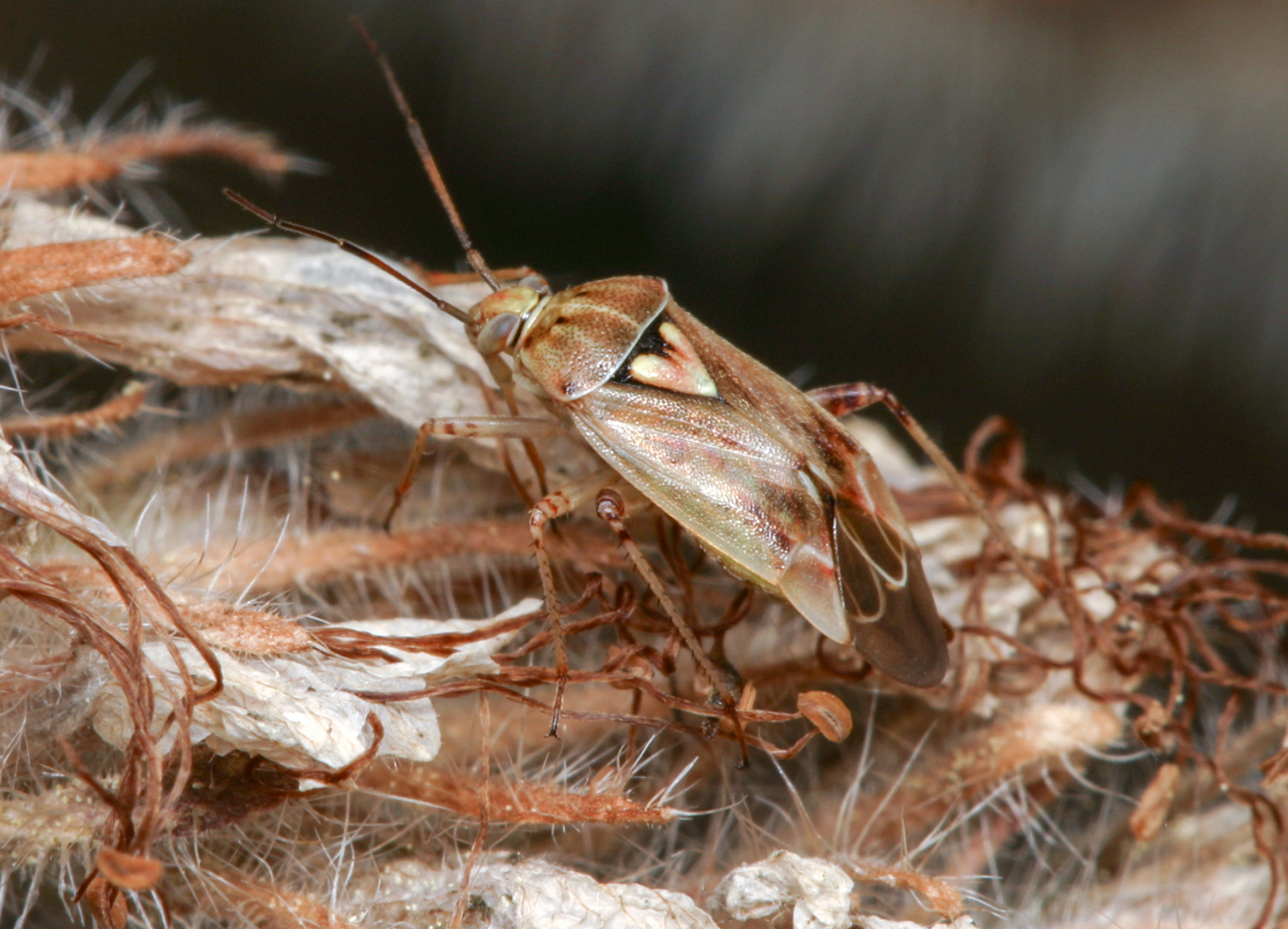

Lygus bugs are common pests here including the Western Tarnished Plant Bug (Lygus hesperus). A vacuum collector called the BugVac is often used for this pest in strawberry.

Birds have mixed effects on strawberries here. They both eat farmed fruits but also the insects that trouble them. Hedgerows attract birds, whether that is desirable or undesirable. In the Central Valley, farm hedgerows, treelines, and woodlands will have 2x–3x the number of species and 3x–6x the population size of birds than an unvegetated edge of a field. Whatever the specific effect of birds upon strawberry fields, large hedgerows in this state do improve both the yield and quality of strawberries grown nearby versus those grown next to smaller hedges or grassy banks.

=== Weeds ===
Yellow sweetclover (Melilotus officinalis L. Lam.), chickweed (Stellaria spp.), annual bluegrass (Poa annua Linnaeus), shepherd's purse (Capsella bursa-pastoris Linnaeus Medikus), crabgrass (various Digitaria spp.), spotted spurge (Euphorbia maculata Linnaeus Small), and yellow nutsedge are common annual weeds in strawberry.

=== Treatments ===
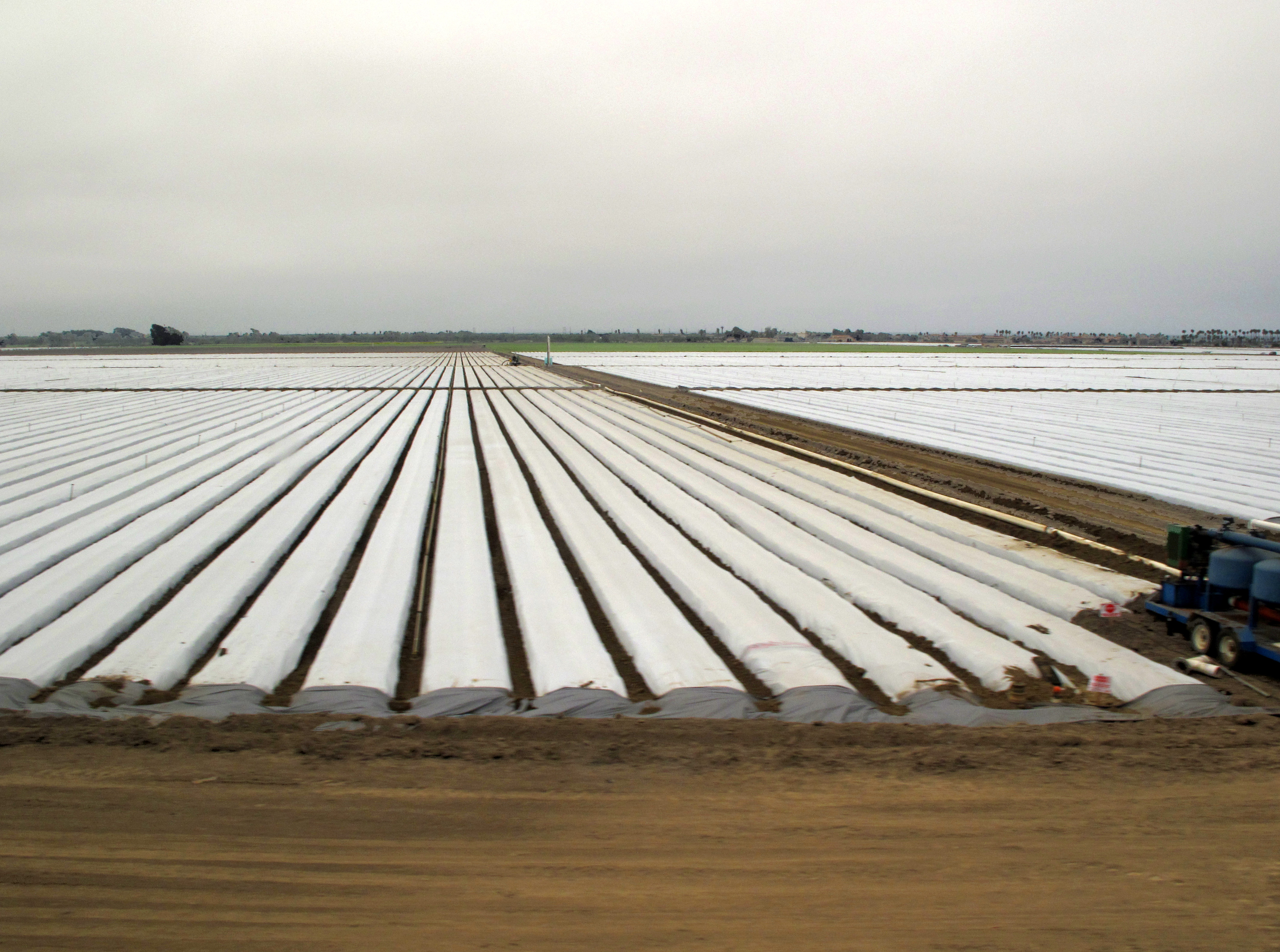
White plastic

UC IPM recommends pesticide selection criteria, resistance management strategies, application practices, and environmental considerations.

Fungicides are used many times per season. Captan is by far the most common, averaging 7.3 applications per season, pyraclostrobin 2.5, cyprodinil 2.3, fludioxonil 2.3, boscalid 1.8, fenhexamid 1.4, pyrimethanil 1.2, penthiopyrad 0.9, sodium tetraborohydrate decahydrate 0.8, fluxapyroxad 0.75, and there were rare uses of Polyoxin D, Neem Oil, Fluopyram, Banda de Lupinus albus doce, Trifloxystrobin, Bacillus subtilis, Reynoutria sachalinensis, Thiram, Streptomyces lydicus, Bacillus amyloliquefaciens, Thiophanate-methyl, Aureobasidium pullulans, Hydrogen dioxide, and Peroxyacetic acid. UCR recommends fungicides and resistance management guidelines.

The interests of nurseries and growers in maintaining fungicide efficacy necessitates coordination of their fungicide usage between them to slow resistance evolution.

Fumigation in this crop was selected by Ansel Adams and Nancy Newhall as one of the achievements of the University of California system to photograph for their centennial book. However, increasing legal restrictions have made alternatives financially more attractive, otherwise more attractive, or even just necessary. Methyl bromide, and then methyl bromide + chloropicrin, were the original fumigants which allowed great expansion of strawberries here. Over the next several decades this encouraged breeding to ignore disease resistance in preference to all other traits, and only recently has methyl bromide phaseout made resistance interesting again.

Anaerobic soil disinfestation doesn't work for weeds in this crop, but ASD combined with rice bran is a good alternative to methyl bromide and other soil fumigants for microbial diseases including Verticillium dahliae.

== Breeding ==
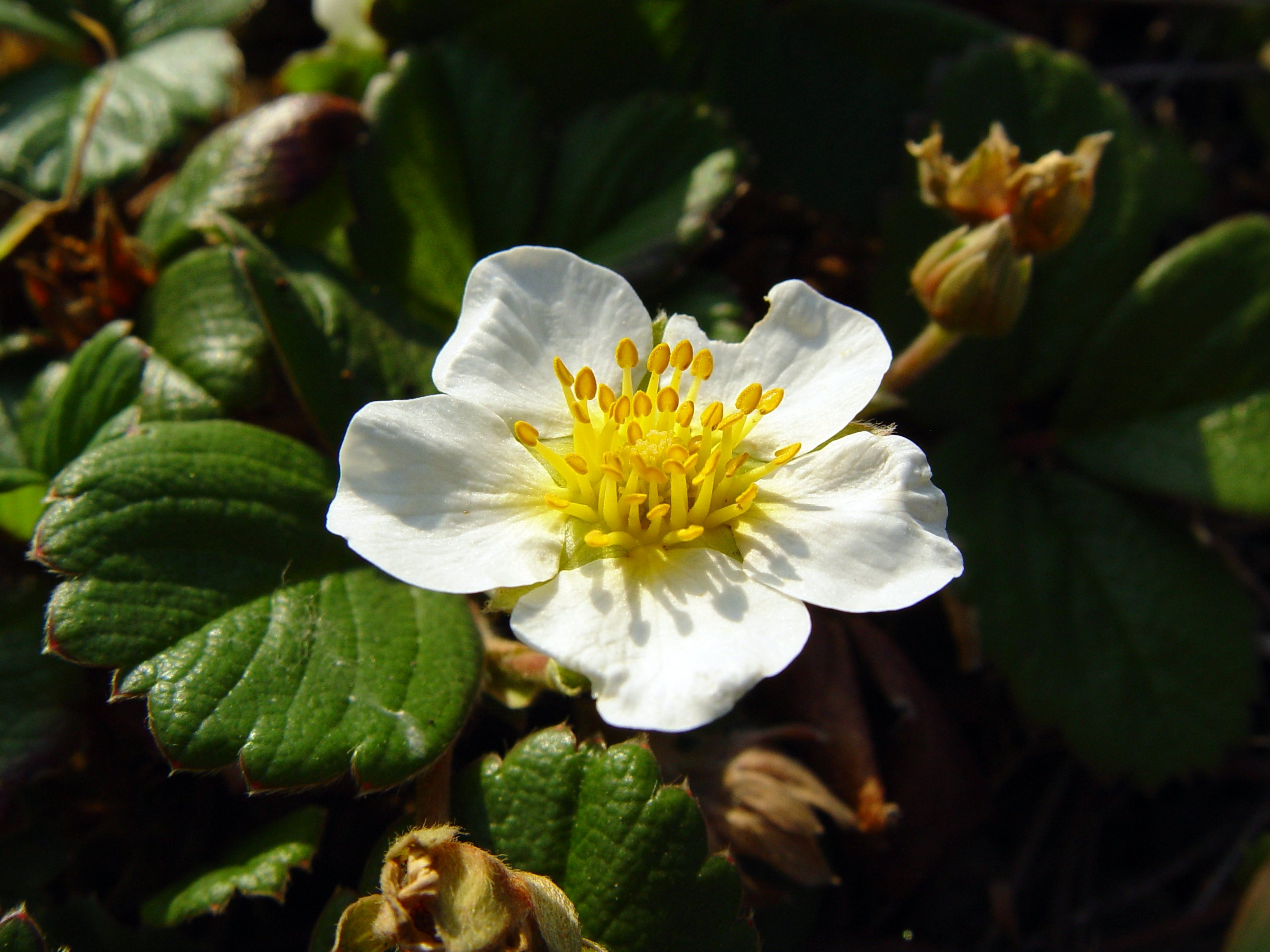
Beach Strawberry (F. chiloensis), a wild parent contributing to the modern strawberry's genetics, San Mateo

The Davis campus is a major hub of strawberry breeding in the state, and indeed in the world. UCD's varieties may be licensed from ITC. From 1986 Douglas Shaw headed the program, and starting in 1991 Kirk Larson co-headed with him. In 2013 they attempted to negotiate a retirement arrangement in which they would start their own breeding company, licensing UCD's patented varieties. UCD initially agreed but, anticipating the loss of revenue from what would essentially be a spin-off, reversed themselves. Shaw and Larson retired anyway in 2014 as California Berry Cultivars, licensed what they could and began to breed from those, and sued UCD for not holding to the previous agreement. UCD countersued, alleging they had walked away with (stolen) unreleased germplasm and various other intellectual property violations. A civil trial resulted and, although CBC rapidly lost ground, the judge suggested that UCD would also be examined and face some consequences if the trial were to proceed. UCD and CBC settled with CBC forgoing $2.5 million in future royalties.

Cal Poly runs the Strawberry Center for both research, and producer education.

Other strawberry species (Fragaria spp.) are commonly used in breeding, including F. vesca the Woodland Strawberry. The UCD program is no exception and its genetic analyses also are used around the world by geneticists, other researchers, and breeders.

The analysis of Pincot et al., 2018 incidentally identifies a likely bottleneck in UCD's germplasm beginning in 1975.

CalPoly Strawberry Center does not operate a breeding program of its own. Instead the SC screens the varieties that come out of all of the state's breeding programs for disease resistance.

Driscoll's has its own private breeding program.

Day-neutrality is necessary to cultivation in some of the state's growing zones. F. virginiana subsp. glauca's day-neutrality was introgressed into F. × ananassa and first released in 1979 varieties.

=== Cultivars ===
UC IPM lists and describes the most commonly grown varieties of strawberry here.

UC Davis's Innovation and Technology Commercialization office licenses and sub-licenses all cultivars created by the entire University system. These are:

UC Varieties
Day Neutral	Short Day	Summer
Albion	Camino Real	Portola
Cabrillo	Gaviota	UCD Finn
Monterey	Mojave	UCD Mojo
San Andreas	Petaluma	
Aromas	Ventana	
UCD Royal Royce	Benicia	
UCD Valiant	Grenada	
UCD Moxie	Fronteras	
	Merced	
Palomar
UCD Victor
UCD Warrior

As of July 2022 twelve nurseries are licensed to propagate UCD varieties: Cal, Cedar Point, Crown, Innovative Organic, Jacobsen Pacific, Larse, Lassen Canyon, Monte Vista, Mountain Valley, NorCal, Planasa, and Sierra-Cascade.

cv. 'Camino Real' produces heavily in the Central Coast. 'CR' yields over 4,000 pounds per acre (4.5 t/ha) more than cv. 'Chandler', and berries average 27 grams vs. 21 grams, in Fresno County.

From the introduction of methyl bromide in late 1950s to the beginning of phaseout in the late 1990s, MB's effectiveness encouraged breeders to ignore soilborne disease resistance in preference to all other traits. Today, with the end of all methyl bromide use outside of nurseries in December 2016, resistance has become a topic of interest again. There is a wide range of resistance to soilborne pathogens in existing cultivars and these resistances can be effective.

Varieties bred here tie with Mediterranean varieties for the most inbred in the world, due to intense breeding specifically for this market.

Florida's industry commonly uses varieties originated here. Turkey's modern strawberry industry was begun from California varieties, and still relies heavily on varieties bred here, along with Florida varieties and some from Australia.

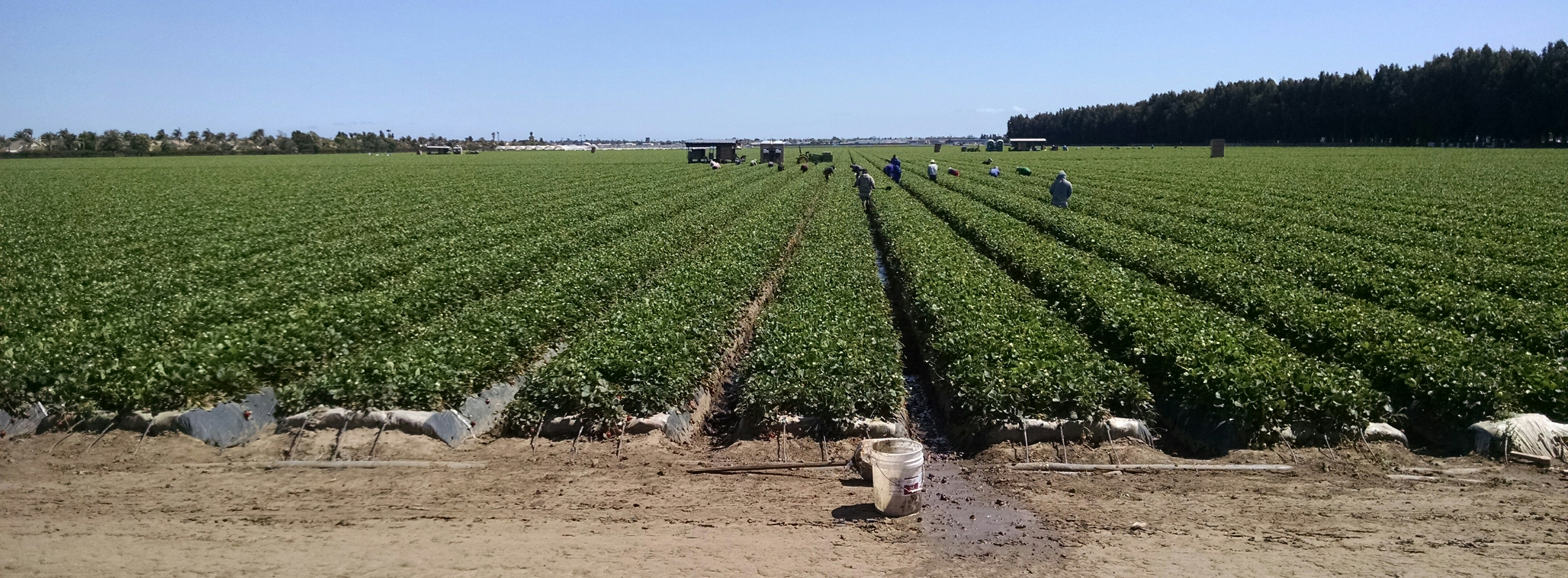

== Testing ==
UCD's Foundation Plant Services performs disease testing (especially for viruses), variety identification testing, and supplies tissue or plants for propagation material.
