= Priory Meadows, Hickling =

UK Site of Special Scientific Interest

Coordinates: 52.771°N 1.579°E

- Site of Special Scientific Interest
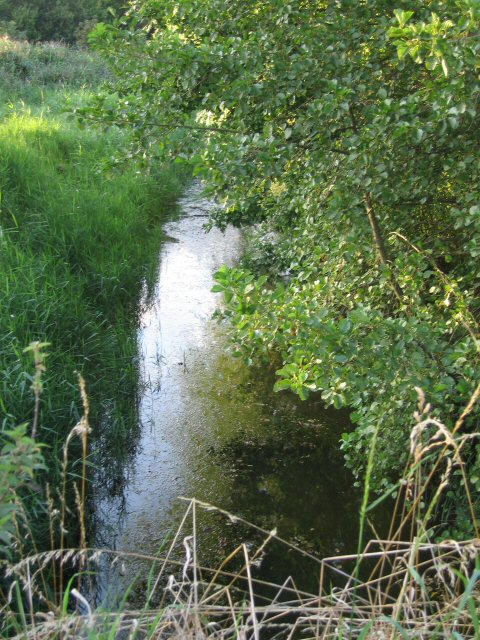
- Location of Priory Meadows, Hickling.
- Area of search: Norfolk
- Grid reference: TG 415 253
- Interest: Biological
- Area: 23.9 hectares (59 acres)
- Notification date: 1986
- Location map: Magic Map

Priory Meadows, Hickling is a 23.9-hectare (59-acre) biological Site of Special Scientific Interest south-east of North Walsham in Norfolk, England. It is part of the Broadland Ramsar site and Special Protection Area, and The Broads Special Area of Conservation.

The grassland, on damp and acidic peat soil, is managed traditionally; it has a rich and diverse flora with herbs such as tormentil and marsh cinquefoil. There is also a network of dykes with aquatic plants.
