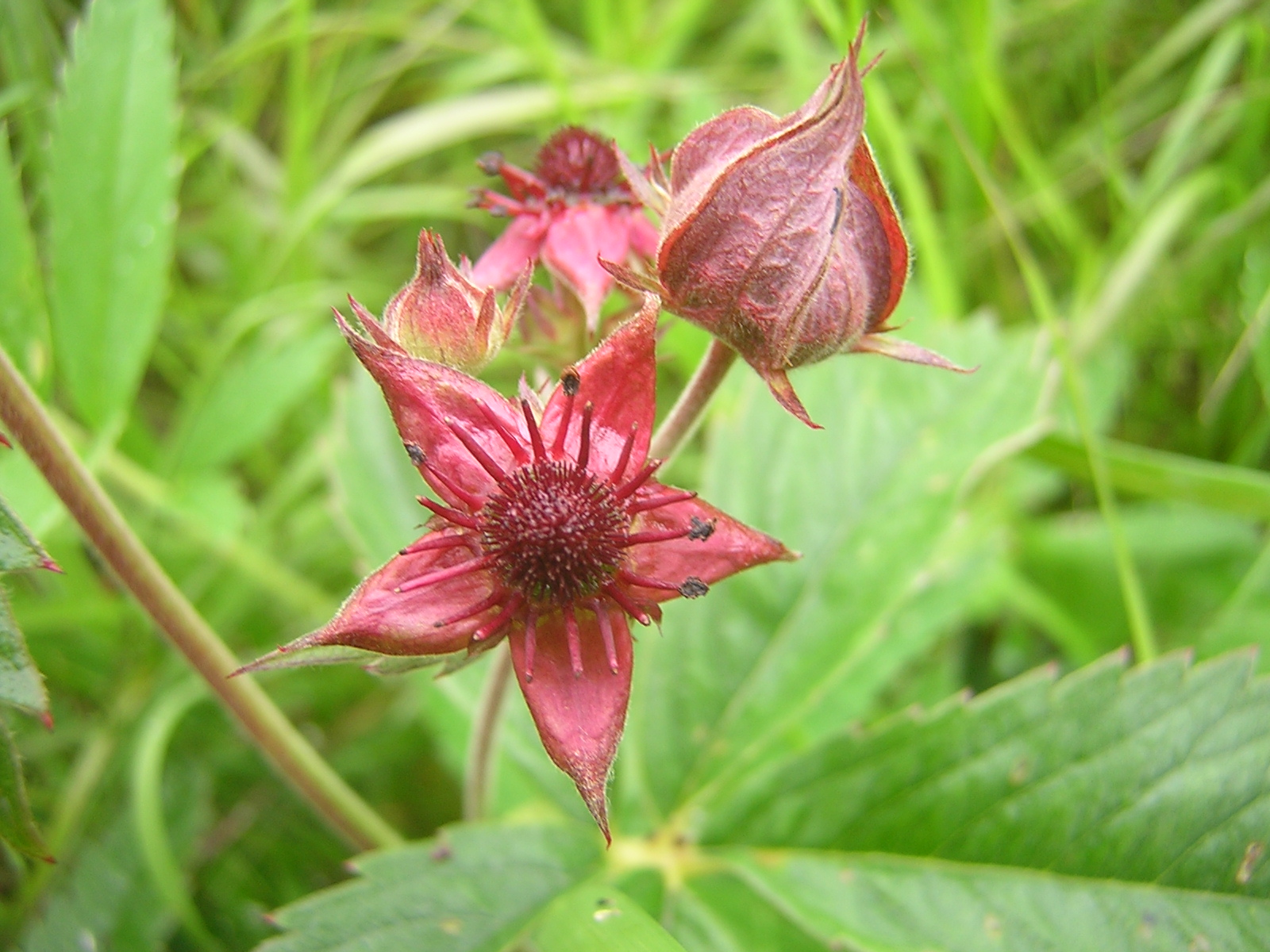
- Marsh cinquefoil, Comarum palustre

Scientific classification
- Kingdom: Plantae
- Clade: Tracheophytes
- Clade: Angiosperms
- Clade: Eudicots
- Clade: Rosids
- Order: Rosales
- Family: Rosaceae
- Subfamily: Rosoideae
- Tribe: Potentilleae
- Subtribe: Fragariinae
- Genus: Comarum; L.

= Comarum =

Genus of flowering plants

Comarum is a genus of plants formerly included with the genus Potentilla ("typical cinquefoils"). It contains one or two species:

- Comarum palustre – marsh cinquefoil, swamp cinquefoil
- Comarum salesowianum (sometimes considered as the monotypic genus Farinopsis.)

== See also ==
- Fragaria × Comarum hybrids
