= Camino Real strawberry =

Strawberry cultivar

- Species: Fragaria × ananassa
- Hybrid parentage: Cal 89.230-7 × Cal 90.253-3
- Marketing names: Camino Real
- Breeder: Douglas Shaw & Kirk Larson
- Origin: University of California, Davis, United States (released 2001)

cv. 'Camino Real' is a cultivar of strawberry produced by the Shaw & Larson era of the UC Davis breeding program.

== Breeding ==
'Camino Real' is the result of a cross of Cal 89.230-7 × Cal 90.253-3. It was created in 1994, first fruited in 1995 at the Wolfskill Experimental Orchard near Winters, California, and was renamed from 'C213' to cv. 'Camino Real' and released in 2001.

== Specific regions ==
'Camino Real' produces heavily in the Central Coast of California. 'CR' yields over 4,000 pounds per acre (4.5 t/ha) more than cv. 'Chandler', and berries average 27 grams vs. 21 grams, in Fresno County, California.

'Camino Real' is unusually vulnerable to Botrytis Fruit Rot (Botrytis cinerea) in the conditions around the University of Florida's Gulf Coast Research and Education Center in Dover, Florida. Chandler et al., 2006 finds 'CR' is the worst among several common varieties, although 'Sweet Charlie' is also consistently somewhat susceptible. It is possible that the Botrytis problem in 'CR' could be remedied with different fungicide timing.

Louisiana State University recommends 'Camino Real' for commercial production for its large berries, good firmness, and high yield in the state's conditions. In Louisiana this is a mid-season yielding variety.

In South Louisiana specifically, 'Camino Real' is June-bearing, and is recommended for commercial growers in this area.

Canadian inspectors trialed 'Camino Real' in Langley, British Columbia in 2003 and 2004 and found it to be later-maturing than cv. 'Rainier' or cv. 'Ventana'. Oregon Extension does not recommend this for the Pacific North West.

'Camino Real' is recommended for Victoria, Australia, by Victorian Strawberries.

Although isolates of Bc with carbendazim- and procymidone-resistance have appeared in Argentina, isolates from 'Camino Real' specifically are still vulnerable to both.

== Cultivation ==
'Camino Real' is a short-day variety. It is licensed by UCD ITC.

== Disease ==
'Camino Real' is moderately susceptible to Ramularia (Ramularia tulasnei, Common Leaf Spot), mildly to Powdery Mildew (Sphaerotheca macularis), is variously described as moderately resistant or susceptible to Anthracnose Crown Rot (Colletotrichum acutatum), is highly resistant to Verticillium Wilt (Verticillium dahliae), and highly resistant to Phytophthora Crown Rot (Phytophthora cactorum), and very susceptible to Gray Mold (Botrytis cinerea). When combined with insecticidal treatment, tolerant to Two-Spotted Spidermite (Tetranychus urticae) as much as or better than cv. 'Gaviota'.

== Pests ==
'Camino Real' is repellent and insecticidal to all stages of Western Flower Thrips (Frankliniella occidentalis). 'CR' is dramatically more repellent and insecticidal than cv. 'Camarosa' and somewhat more than cv. 'Albion'.
