= California Strawberry Commission =

California government agency

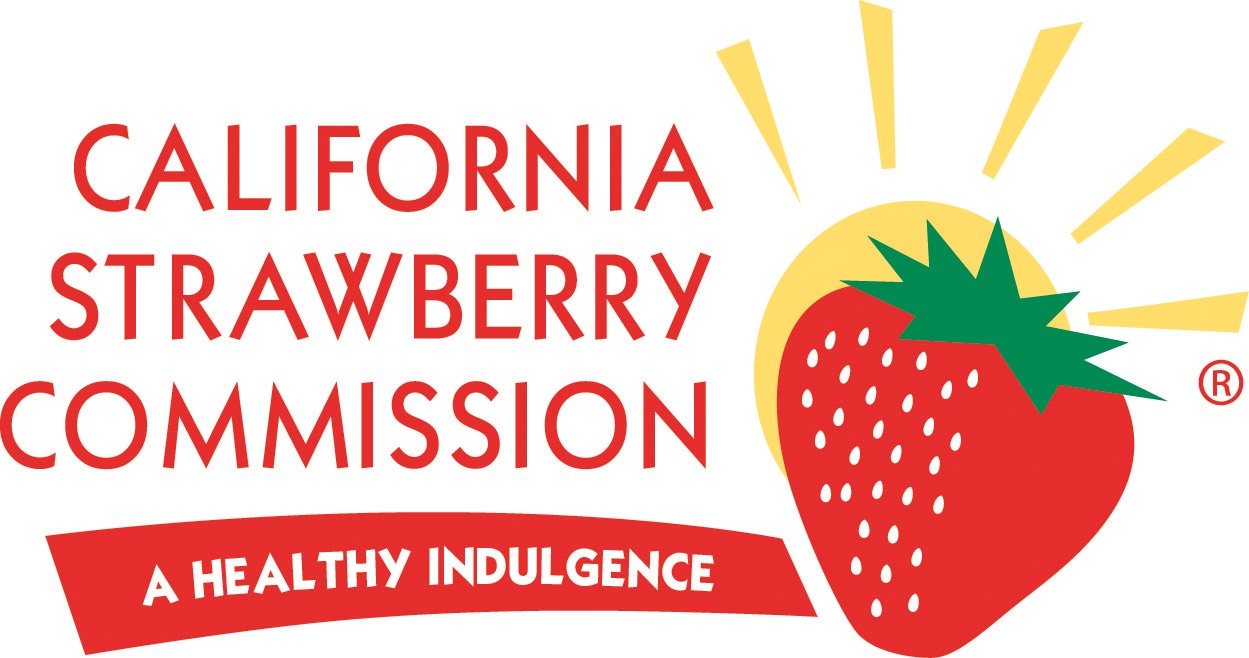

Agency overview
- Formed: 1993
- Headquarters: 180 Westridge Dr., Suite 101; Watsonville, California
- Agency executive: Rick Tomlinson, President
- Parent agency: California Department of Food and Agriculture
- Website: www.californiastrawberries.com

The California Strawberry Commission, is a state-chartered agency of the California Department of Food and Agriculture. Established by the California State Legislature in 1993, the commission replaced the California Strawberry Advisory Board. The commission represents nearly 600 strawberry shippers, processors and growers within the state of California. The commission is not funded by tax payers but by self-taxation or assessments on California strawberry growers. The amount assessed is approved annually by the commission board of directors. This assessment pays for the commission's activities and projects.

The current president is Rick Tomlinson. He replaces Mark Murai, a third generation strawberry farmer from Orange County, California.

== Activities and projects ==
The California Strawberry Commission focuses activities and projects in:

- Public Policy
- Trade Relations
- Marketing Communications
- Production and Nutrition Research
- Grower Education and Outreach

Activities and projects are developed, approved and implemented under the authority of the commission's board of directors.

The CSC's predecessor organization, popularized the use of soil fumigation starting in 1967 and it has remained vital ever since.

== See also ==
- U.S. Department of Agriculture
- California Environmental Protection Agency
- Production of strawberries in California
