= Fragaria × Comarum hybrids =

Hybrid strawberry

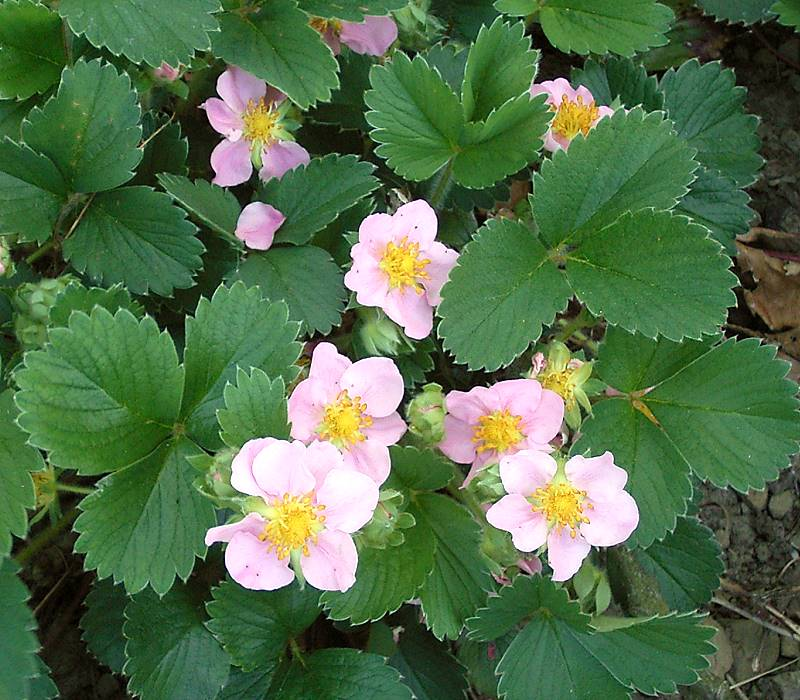
Fragaria x Comarum 'Frel' Pink Panda

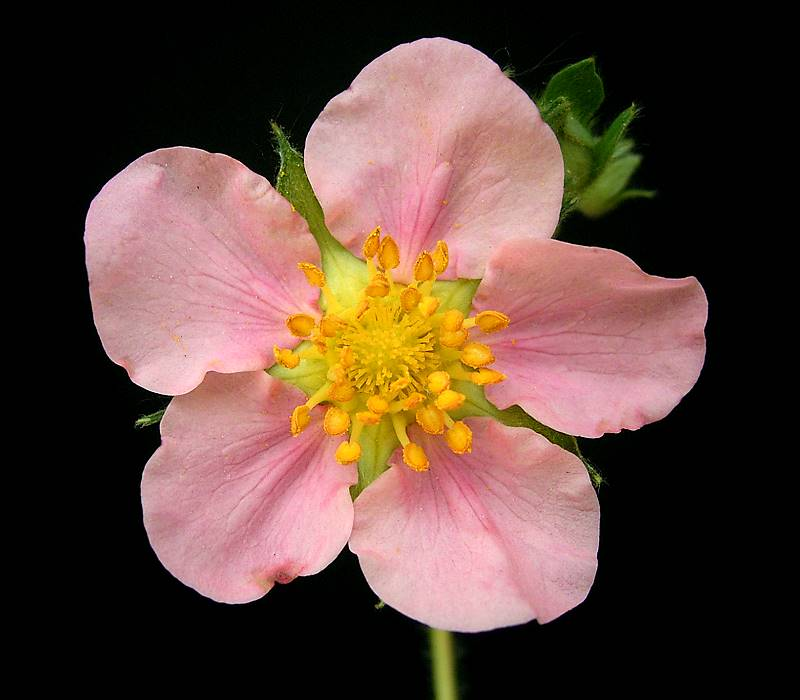
Flower of 'Frel' Pink Panda

There are several commercially important hybrids between Fragaria and Comarum species in existence. A name for Fragaria × Comarum is available as × Comagaria Büscher & G.H. Loos in Veroff. [Bohumer Bot. Ver. 2(1): 6. 2010], along with the combination × Comagaria rosea (Mabb.) Büscher & G.H. Loos.

The first-generation hybrids have been recorded as heptaploid, i.e. with seven sets of chromosomes; four sets of chromosomes came from their octoploid strawberry parent, and three from their hexaploid Comarum parent.

== Commercial cultivars ==
All commercial cultivars resemble strawberries more closely than they do Comarum. They are all vigorous, and produce runners profusely.

- 'Frel', also known as Pink Panda, is a patented hybrid strawberry that is the result of crossing the garden strawberry Fragaria × ananassa subsp. cuneifolia (syn. Fragaria grandiflora) with Marsh Cinquefoil, Comarum palustre (formerly Potentilla palustris), followed by backcrossing to strawberry. The plant is grown for ornamental purposes. It has bright pink flowers (in contrast to the white flowers of naturally occurring strawberry species) and it produces a small number of strawberries.
- 'Franor' (marketed as Red Ruby) developed as a sport of 'Frel', and features a more intense red color in the flowers.
- 'Gerald Straley' is a seedling of 'Frel', selected at Heronswood in Washington for its bright red flowers. It was named after the former curator of the University of British Columbia Botanical Gardens.
- 'Lipstick' is a variety developed in 1966 from a cross between the Marsh Cinquefoil, Comarum palustre and the Garden Strawberry, Fragaria × ananassa. It has deep pink to red flowers, and slightly larger, more flavorful berries than 'Frel'. It, too, is grown for ornamental purposes.

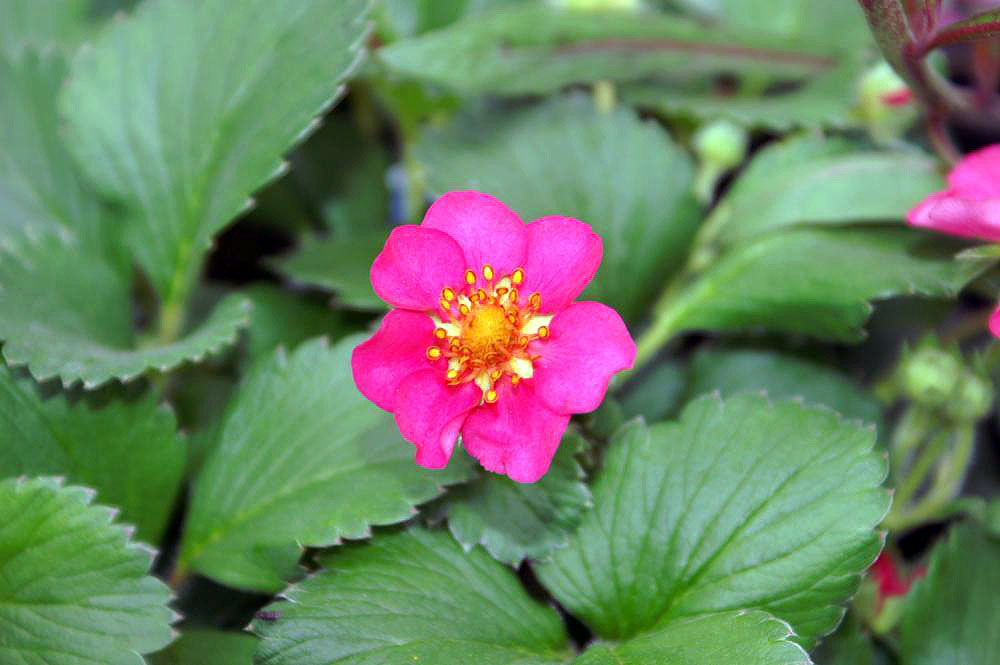
'Lipstick' strawberry bloom

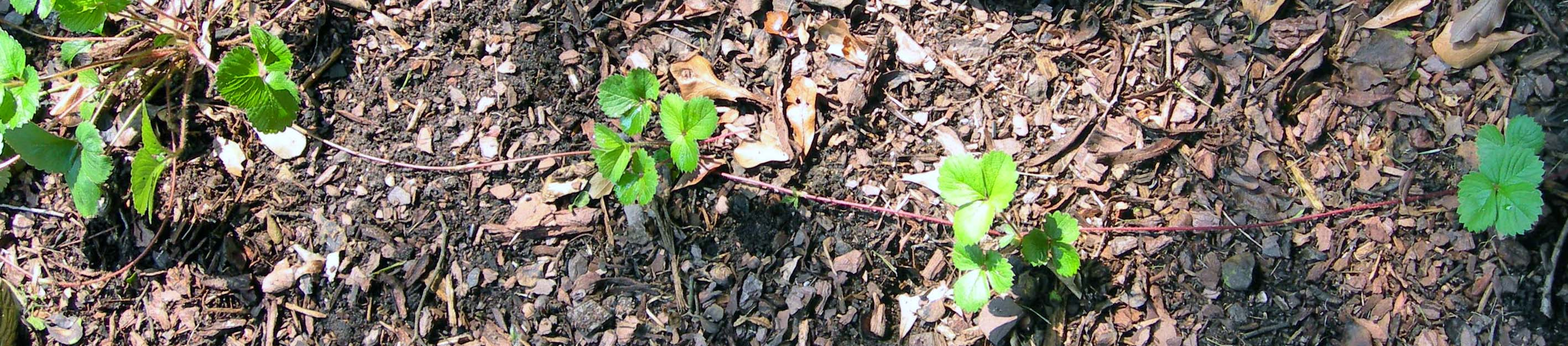
'Lipstick' strawberry plant with runners

- 'Roseberry The original seedling resulted from pollinating SJ8518-11 (Raritan × K74-12) with pollen from SJ9616-1 × Pink Panda. The cross was done in 1994 at AAFC in St-Jean-sur-Richelieu by Shahrokh Khanizadeh. ‘Roseberry’ was selected in 1996 and released in 2010
- 'Rosalyne' (SJ09620-76) originated from a controlled cross between variety ‘Fern' x (SJ9616-1 x Pink Panda) in 1994 at the Horticultural Research and Development Centre of the Agriculture & Agri-Food Canada research station in Saint-Jean-sur-Richelieu, Quebec. it is a winter hardy with long duration of flowering and fruiting.

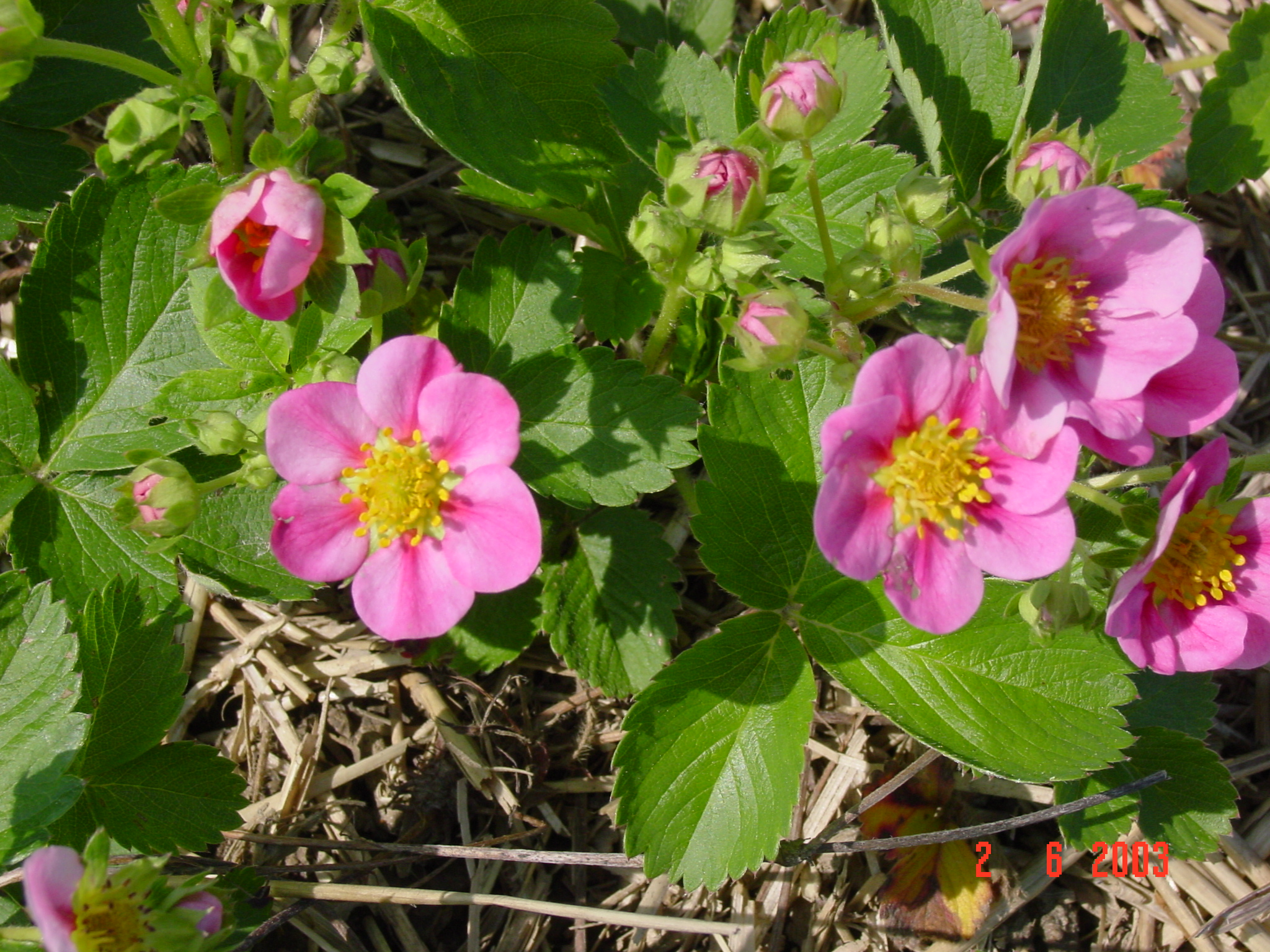
'Roeberry' strawberry bloom

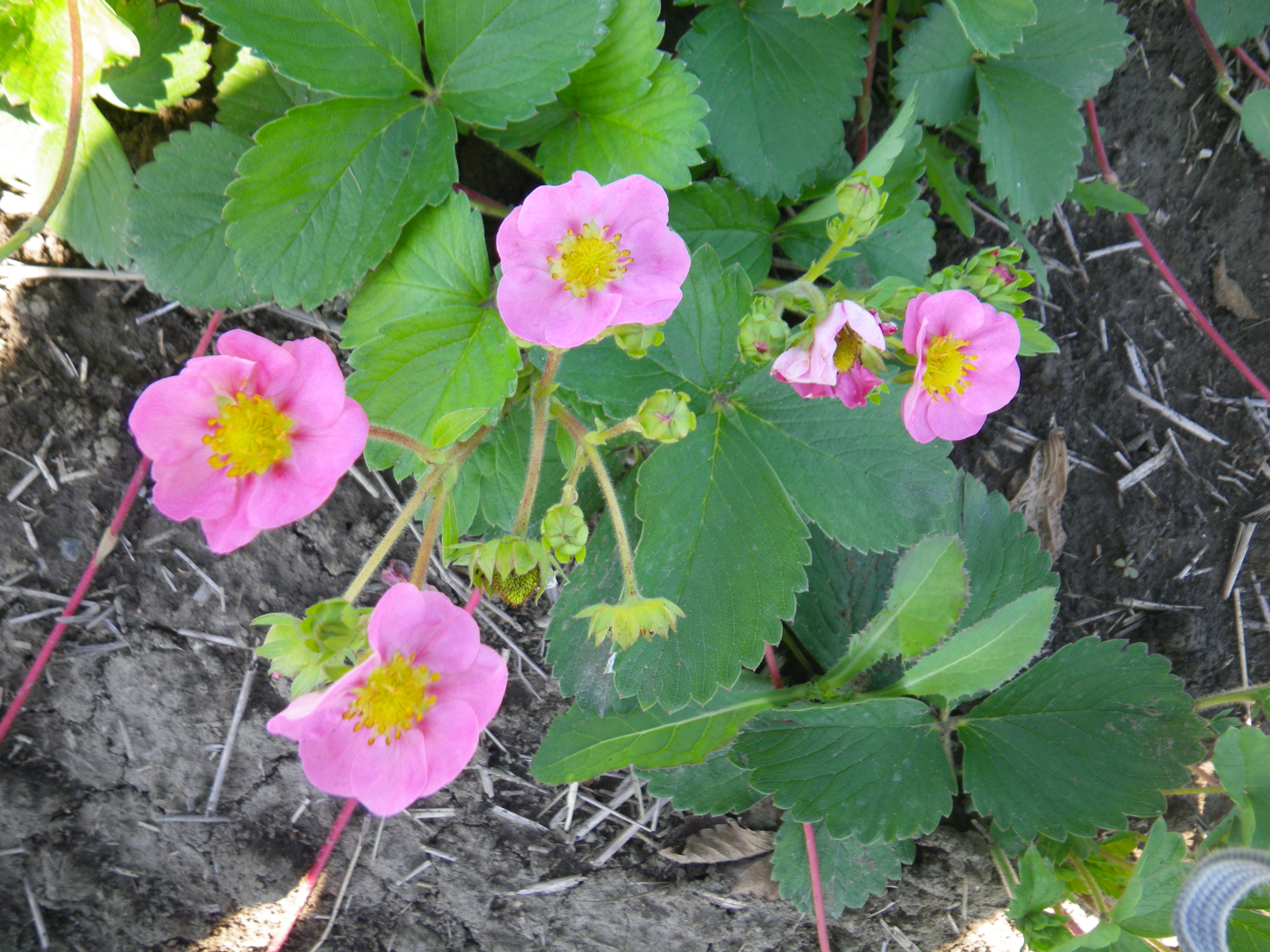
'Rosalyne strawberry bloom
