= Strasberry =

Variety of strawberry

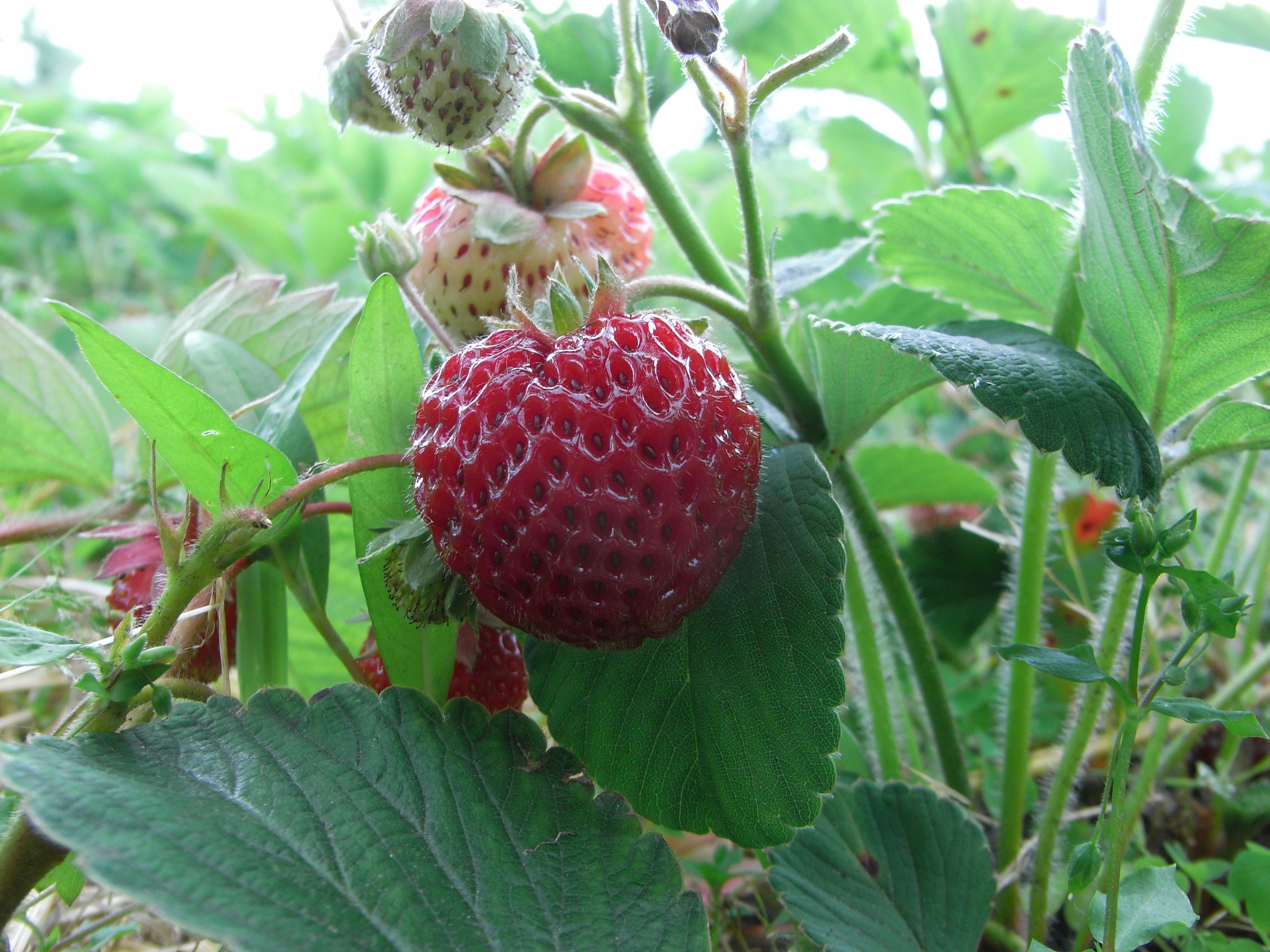
- Fragaria × ananassa 'Mieze Schindler' the Strasberry
- Species: Fragaria × ananassa
- Cultivar: Strasberry
- Origin: Fragaria Lucida perfecta x Johannes Müller

The Strasberry or Fragaria × ananassa 'Mieze Schindler' is a variety of the garden strawberry, with a raspberry-like appearance, originally developed by the German breeder Otto Schindler in 1925. It is similarly soft textured, with characteristics that are similar to raspberries, such as being a deeper red, being rounder and having a bumpy exterior. They are also smaller than an average garden strawberry and have deeper achenes. Unlike other garden strawberry varieties, 'Mieze Schindler' produces no fertile pollen and will need a pollinator. Despite its much-valued flavor, the variety was threatened by extinction, but plants survived in amateur gardens in the former German Democratic Republic until they were reintroduced as a commercial variety by a Dutch farmer in the twenty-first century. Since 2013, a hybrid, self-pollinating version of this strawberry has been marketed under the new trade name Framberry.
