= Marshall strawberry =

Variety of fruit

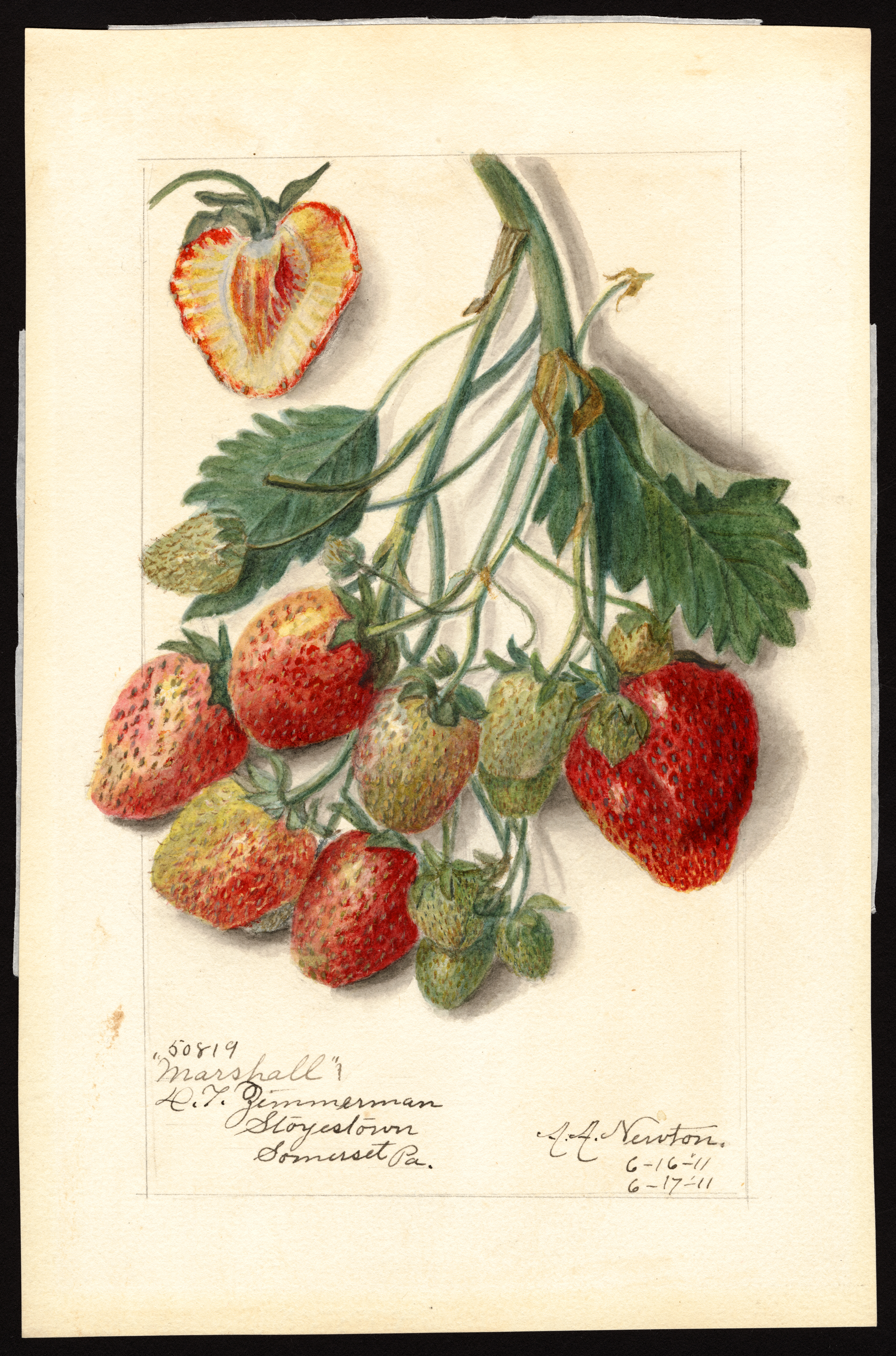
- Species: Fragaria ananassa
- Cultivar: 'Marshall'
- Origin: Massachusetts, 1890

The Marshall strawberry is a cultivated variety of Fragaria ananassa, that is known for an "exceptional" taste and had been described as "the finest eating strawberry" in America.

== Origin ==
The variety was discovered by Marshall F. Ewell of Massachusetts in 1890 and flourished in the Pacific Northwest throughout the early part of the 20th century, where it was an important crop in the region's berry industry. The Marshall, or a group of closely related "Marshall-type" varieties, was also grown under the names Banner, Oregon Plum, Pacific, Dewey, and Oregon Improved. A chance seedling, the variety's parentage was unknown, but according to George M. Darrow may have involved similar, now-lost 19th century varieties such as Burbach and President Wilder, both of which were descended from the Hovey.

The Marshall was, however, especially sensitive to virus diseases and its commercial qualities were particularly harmed by gradual degeneration by the strawberry crinkle virus. This susceptibility to disease meant that by the 1950s it had largely been displaced by other cultivars.

== Characteristics ==
The Marshall strawberry is a midseason variety. It has relatively large leaves and large, deep red fruit with soft flesh. While drought tolerant, as noted above it has a high susceptibility to the crinkle virus.

Despite modern perceptions of the Marshall as having the finest strawberry flavour, some early 20th century writers compared its flavour unfavourably to the strawberry varieties of the mid-19th century: "We have few commercial varieties today that compare in quality with the Pines grown by the amateurs of that period. No modern sort has the exquisite flavor of Burr's New Pine, not even Marshall or William Belt, our acknowledged standards of excellence [...] Quality has been sacrificed to productiveness and firmness". At the time, the Marshall was perceived as a commercial "sub-acid" variety, albeit of high quality, whose mild flavour was particularly popular with the general consumer. It was especially valued as its fruit retained their colour and flavour, if not their texture, after freezing.

== Contemporary status ==
The Marshall Strawberry is currently being maintained at the USDA National Clonal Germplasm Repository in Corvallis, Oregon, and by very few private growers.

Renewing America's Food Traditions, a coalition of sustainable agriculture organizations, listed the Marshall strawberry as one of "700 plant and animal foods at risk of extinction".
