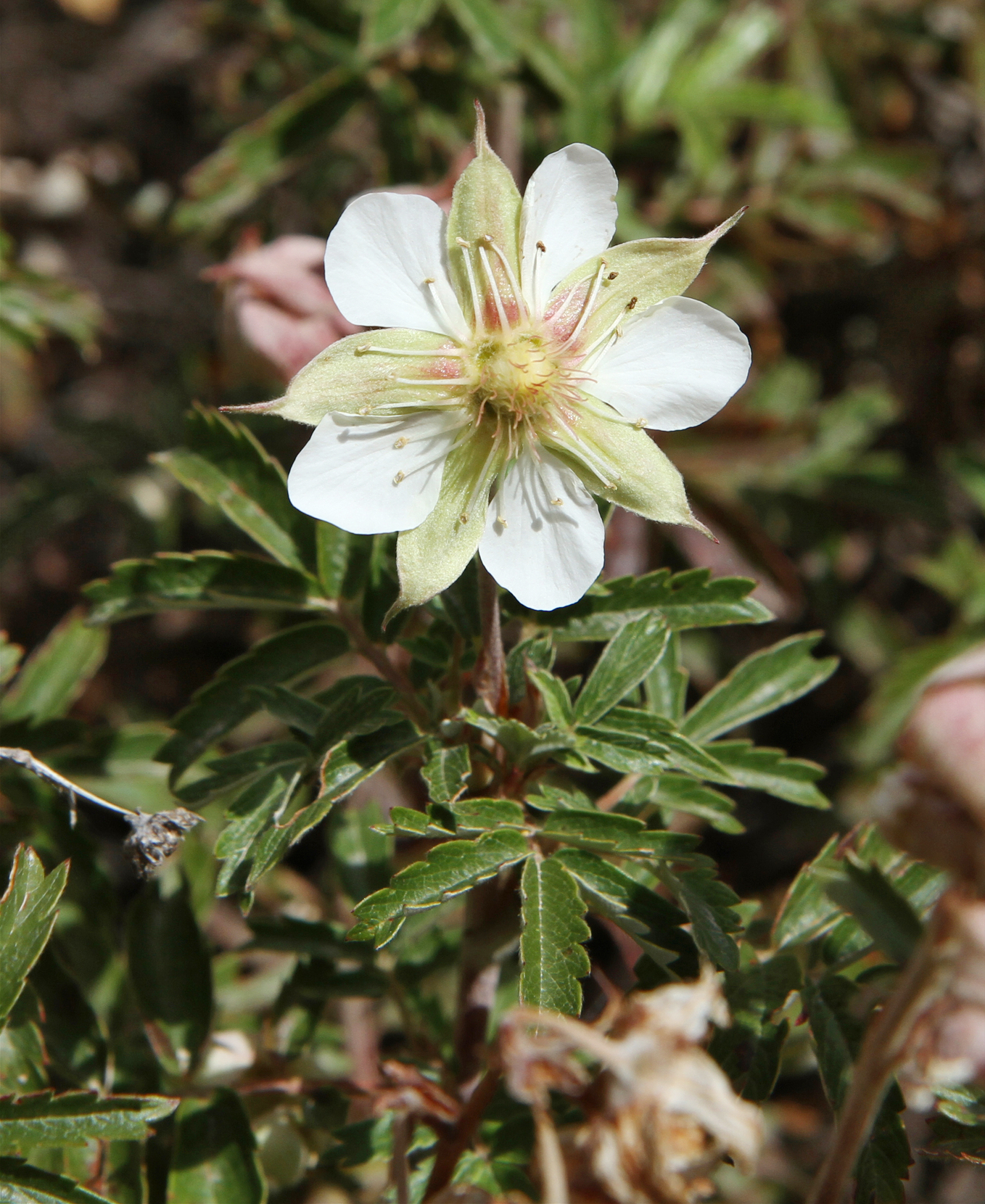

Scientific classification
- Kingdom: Plantae
- Clade: Tracheophytes
- Clade: Angiosperms
- Clade: Eudicots
- Clade: Rosids
- Order: Rosales
- Family: Rosaceae
- Genus: Farinopsis; Chrtek & Soják (1984)
- Species: F. salesoviana

Binomial name
- Farinopsis salesoviana (Stephan) Chrtek & Soják

Synonyms
- Comarum salesovianum (Stephan) Ledeb. (1843); Comarum salesovii (Stephan ex Willd.) Bunge (1839); Comarum salessowii Bunge (1839), orth. var.; Potentilla salesoviana Stephan (1809); Potentilla salesovii Stephan ex Willd. (1809)

= Farinopsis =

Genus of flowering plants

Farinopsis salesoviana is a species of flowering plant belonging to the family Rosaceae. It is a subshrub which ranges from Central Asia to southern Siberia, Pakistan, Mongolia, and northern China. It is the sole species in genus Farinopsis.
