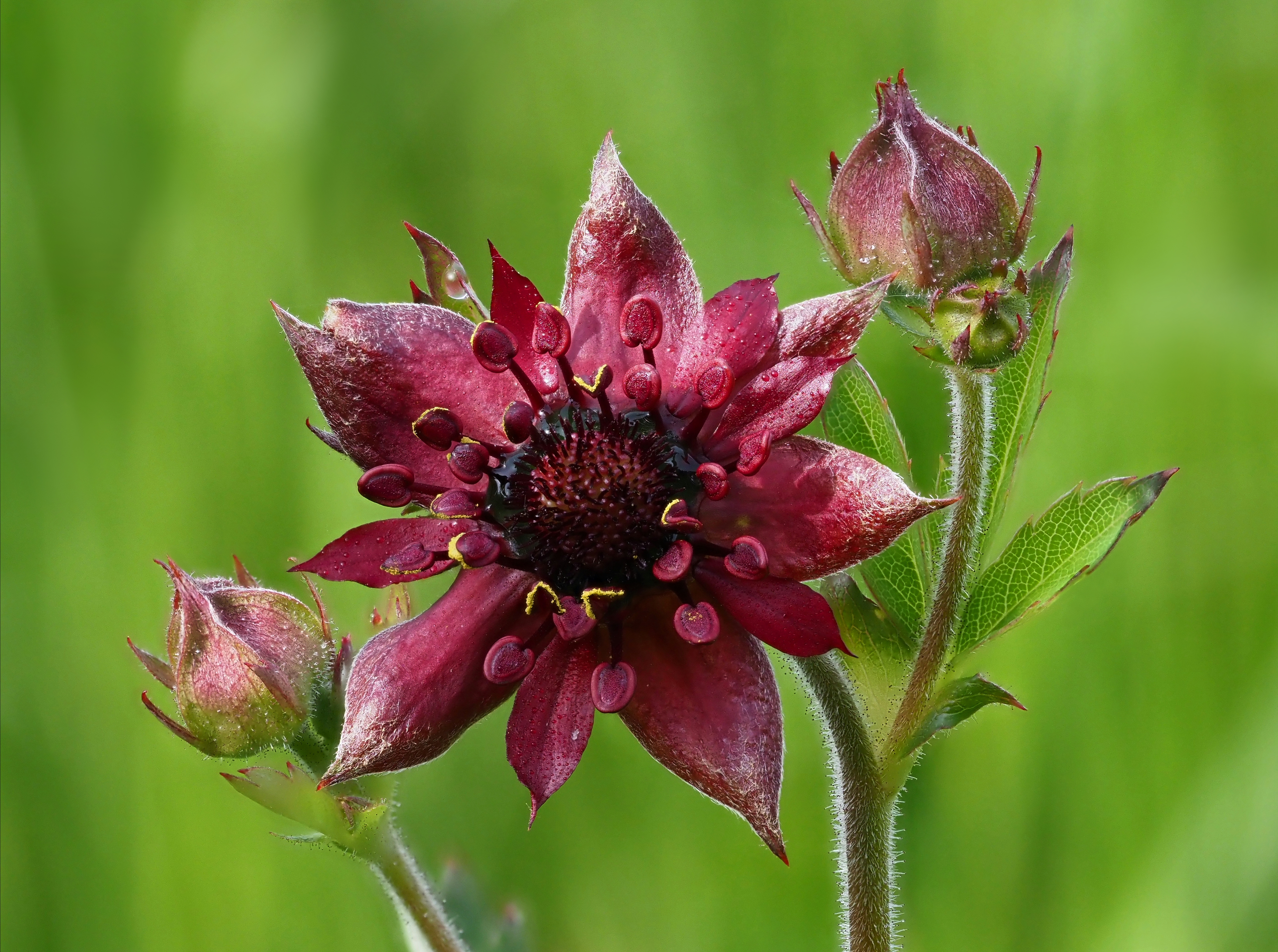
- Fresh flower with intact stamens; Belgium

Scientific classification
- Kingdom: Plantae
- Clade: Tracheophytes
- Clade: Angiosperms
- Clade: Eudicots
- Clade: Rosids
- Order: Rosales
- Family: Rosaceae
- Genus: Comarum
- Species: C. palustre

Binomial name
- Comarum palustre L.

Synonyms
- Potentilla palustris (L.) Scop.

= Comarum palustre =

Species of flowering plant

Comarum palustre (syn. Potentilla palustris), known by the common name marsh cinquefoil, also purple marshlocks and swamp cinquefoil, is a waterside rhizomatous subshrub. It has a circumboreal distribution, occurring throughout cool temperate Asia, Europe, and North America, particularly in northern regions. It is most commonly found on lake shores, marshy riversides and stream margins, often partly submerged with foliage floating. It is a parent of some Fragaria–Comarum hybrids, ornamental plants produced by crossing with strawberries.

== Description ==
The stem is green to reddish-brown, finely hairy at first, low sprawling and vine-like, with long trailing stems up to 1.5 m (5 ft) long or more, scrambling over other plants and occasionally reaching a height of 45 cm (1 ft) but usually lower. The stems root readily at the base and higher up wherever they are in contact with the ground or water. The leaves are glaucous green with three to seven (mostly five) narrow leaflets 3–6 cm (1–2 in) long with coarsely toothed margins. The flowers are produced in loose clusters at the apex of the stems; they vary from red to purple, and are 20–30 mm (1–1 in) in diameter. They have five (occasionally six) large sepals and five (occasionally six) smaller, darker petals, and a ring of spatula-shaped stamens surrounding the receptacle. Flowering is in late spring to summer, from late May to July. The fruit is like a small dry strawberry.

== Cultivation ==
Marsh cinquefoil prefers peaty soils but can also grow in moist sandy areas. It flourishes in USDA Zones 3–9.

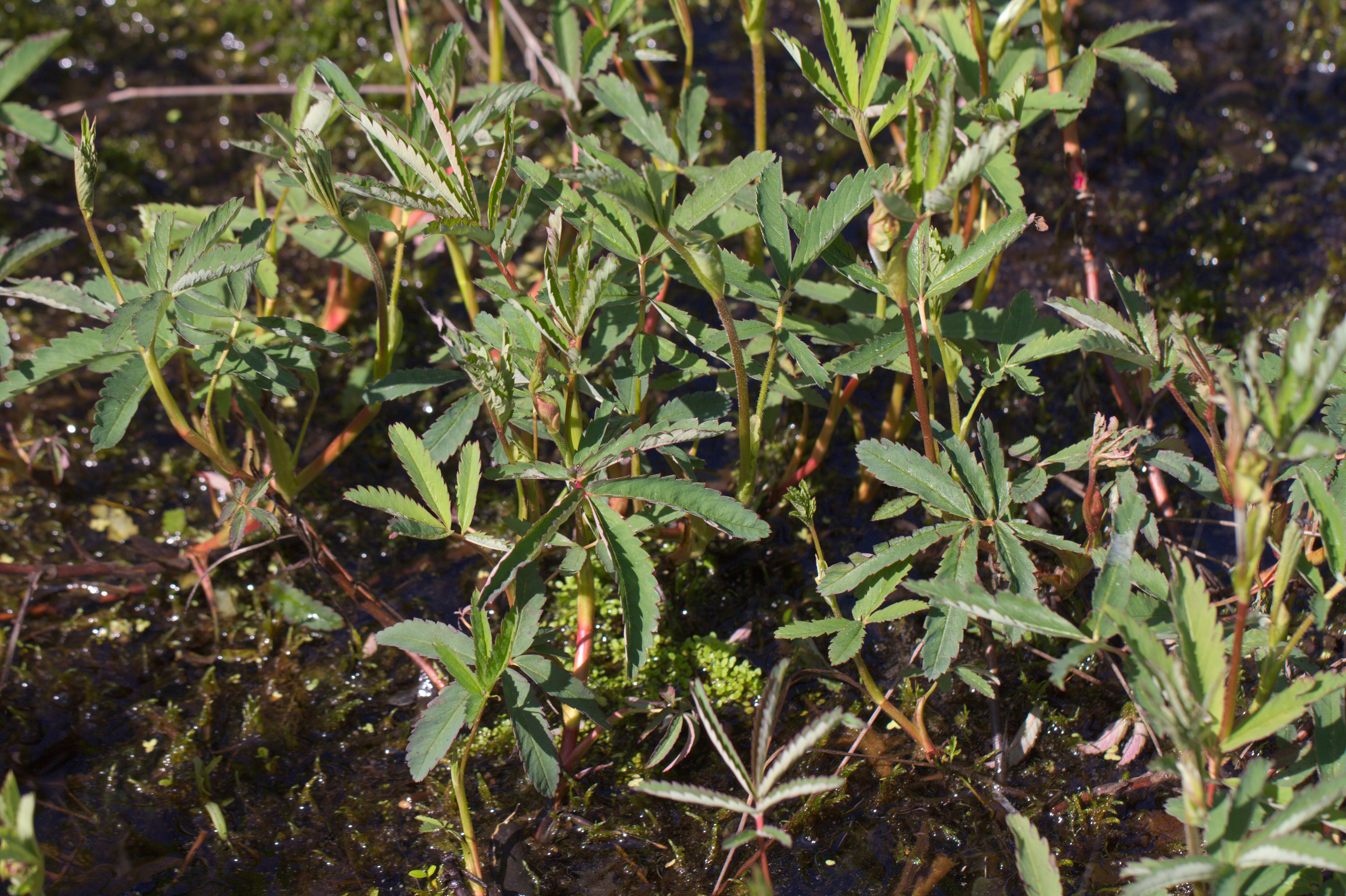
Foliage in spring, Czech Republic

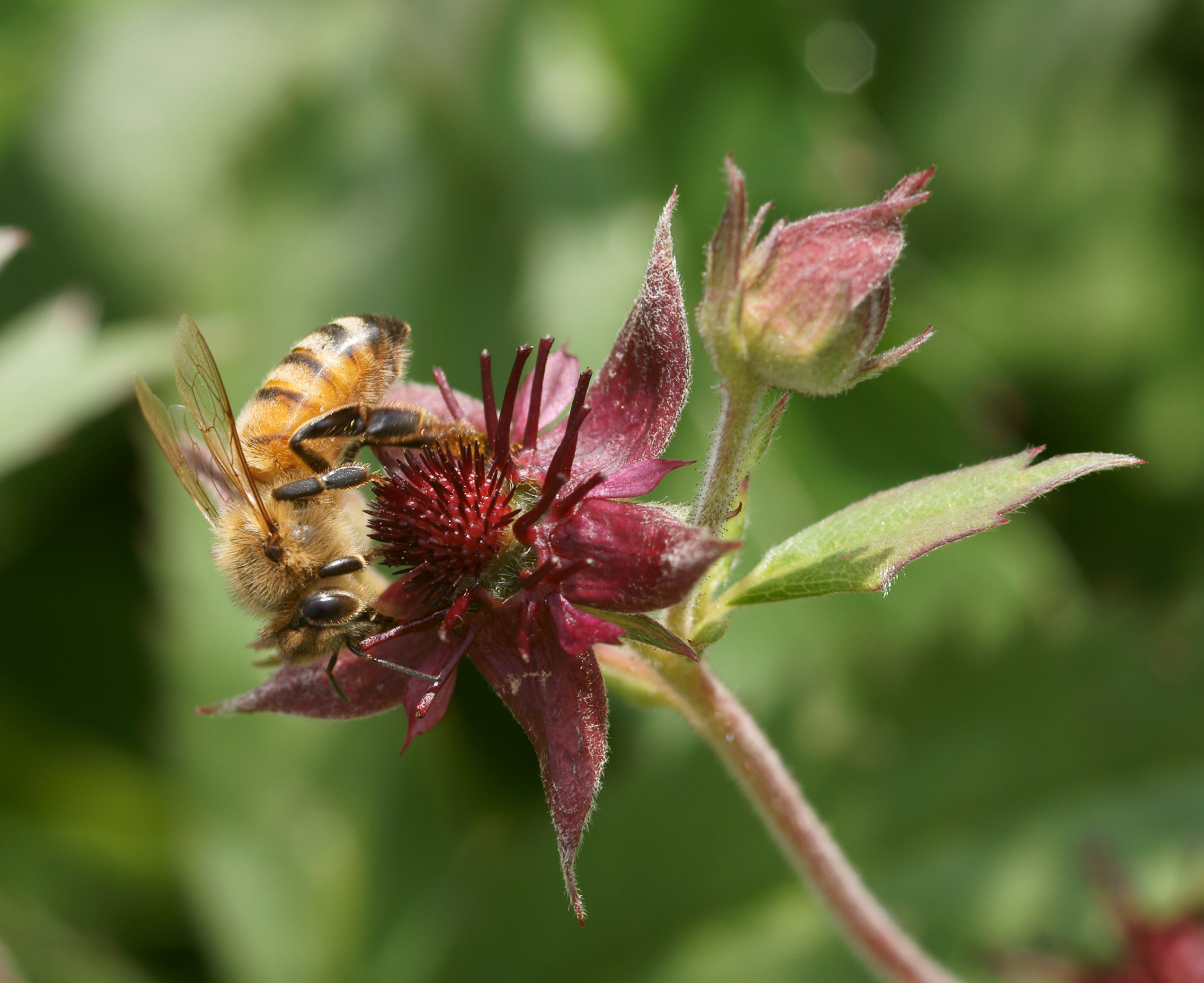
Flower after pollen harvest (with honey bee), Finland

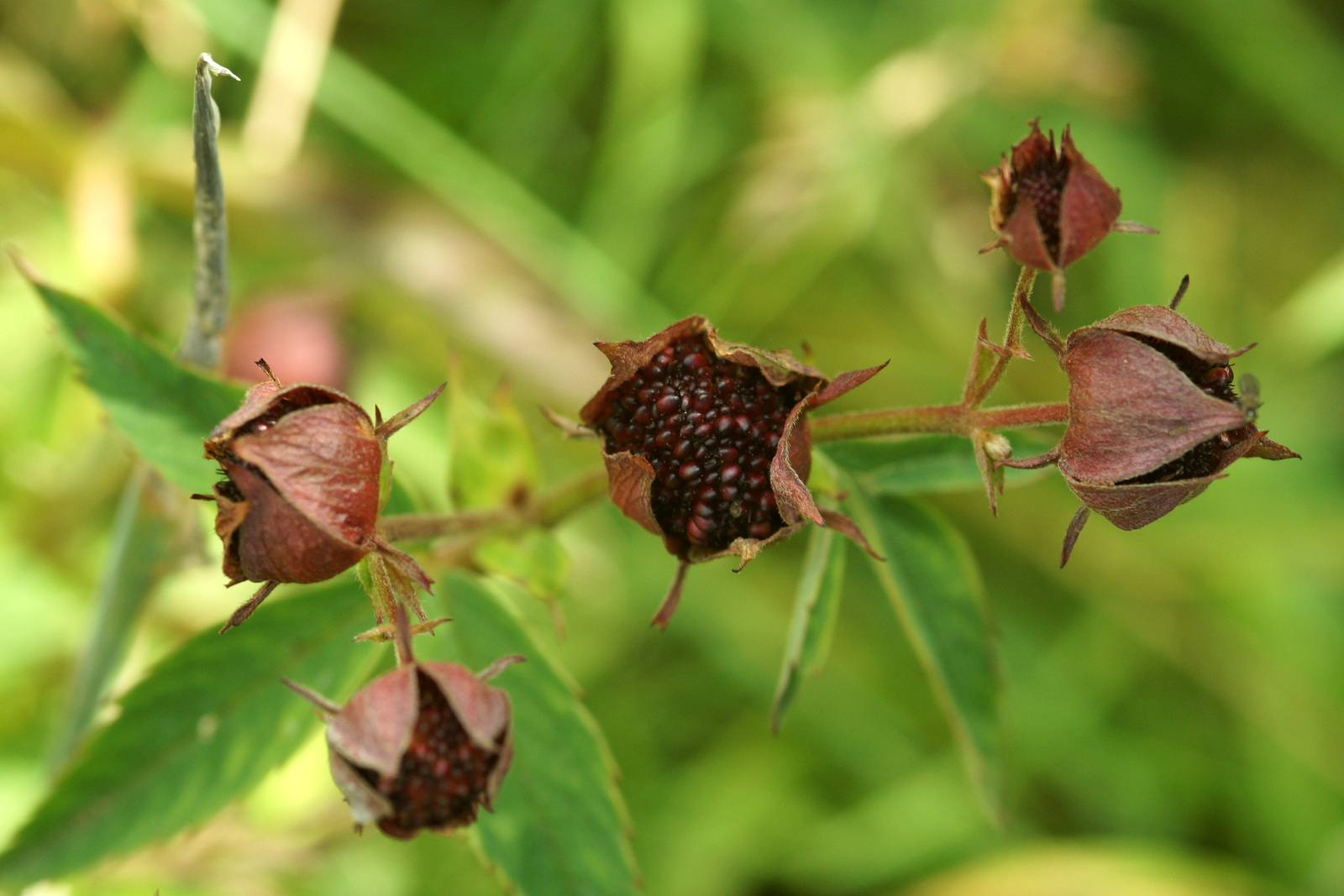
Dried seed heads with seeds, Shetland, UK

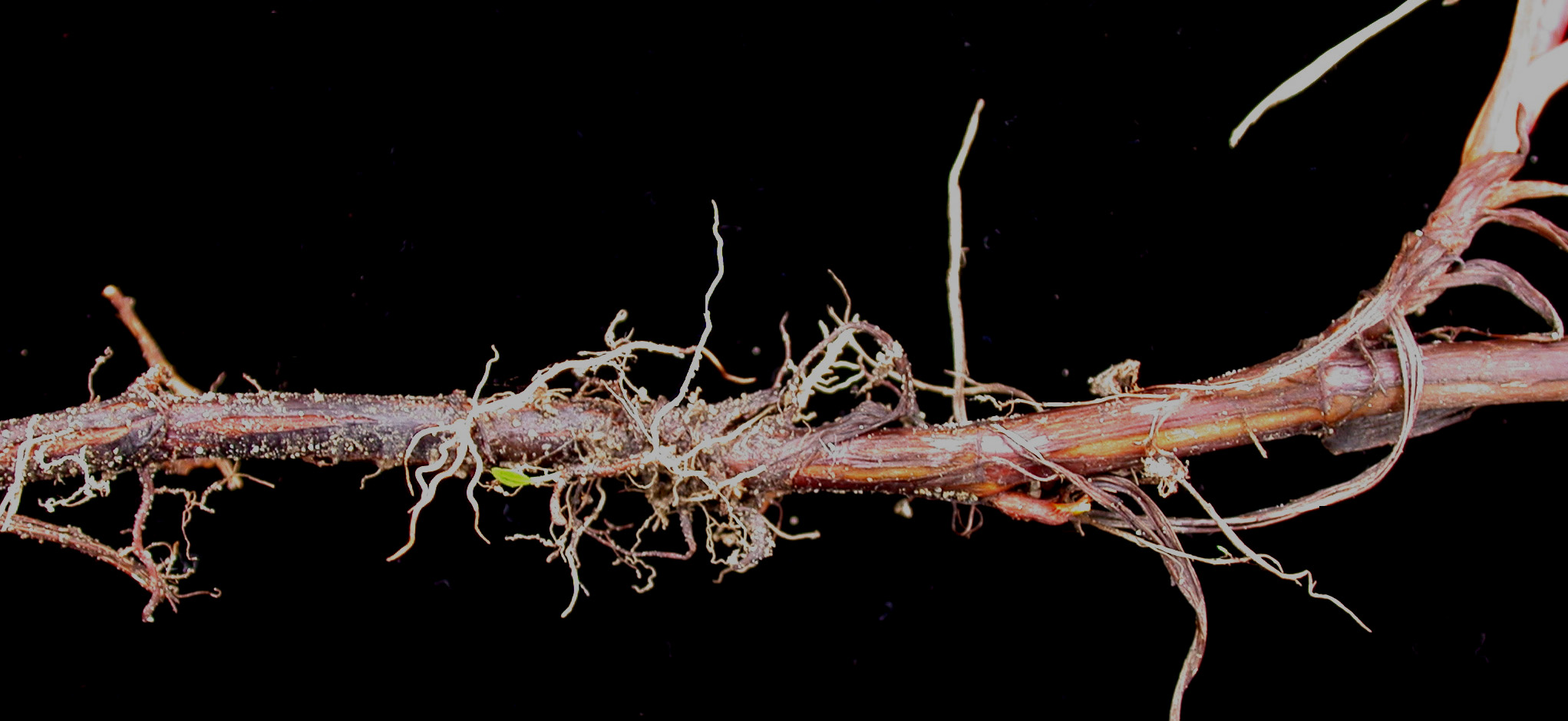
Stem showing rooting along its length. Quebec, Canada
