= Outline of strawberries =

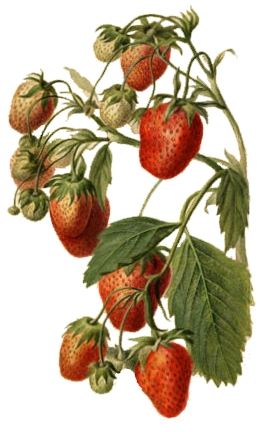
Watercolor picture of a strawberry plant by Deborah Griscom Passmore in 1890

The following outline is provided as an overview of and topical guide to strawberries:

The strawberry is a widely grown hybrid species of the genus Fragaria (collectively known as the strawberries). It is cultivated worldwide for its fruit. The fruit (which is not a botanical berry, but an aggregate accessory fruit) is widely appreciated for its characteristic aroma, bright red color, juicy texture, and sweetness.

== Types of strawberries ==
=== Cultivars ===
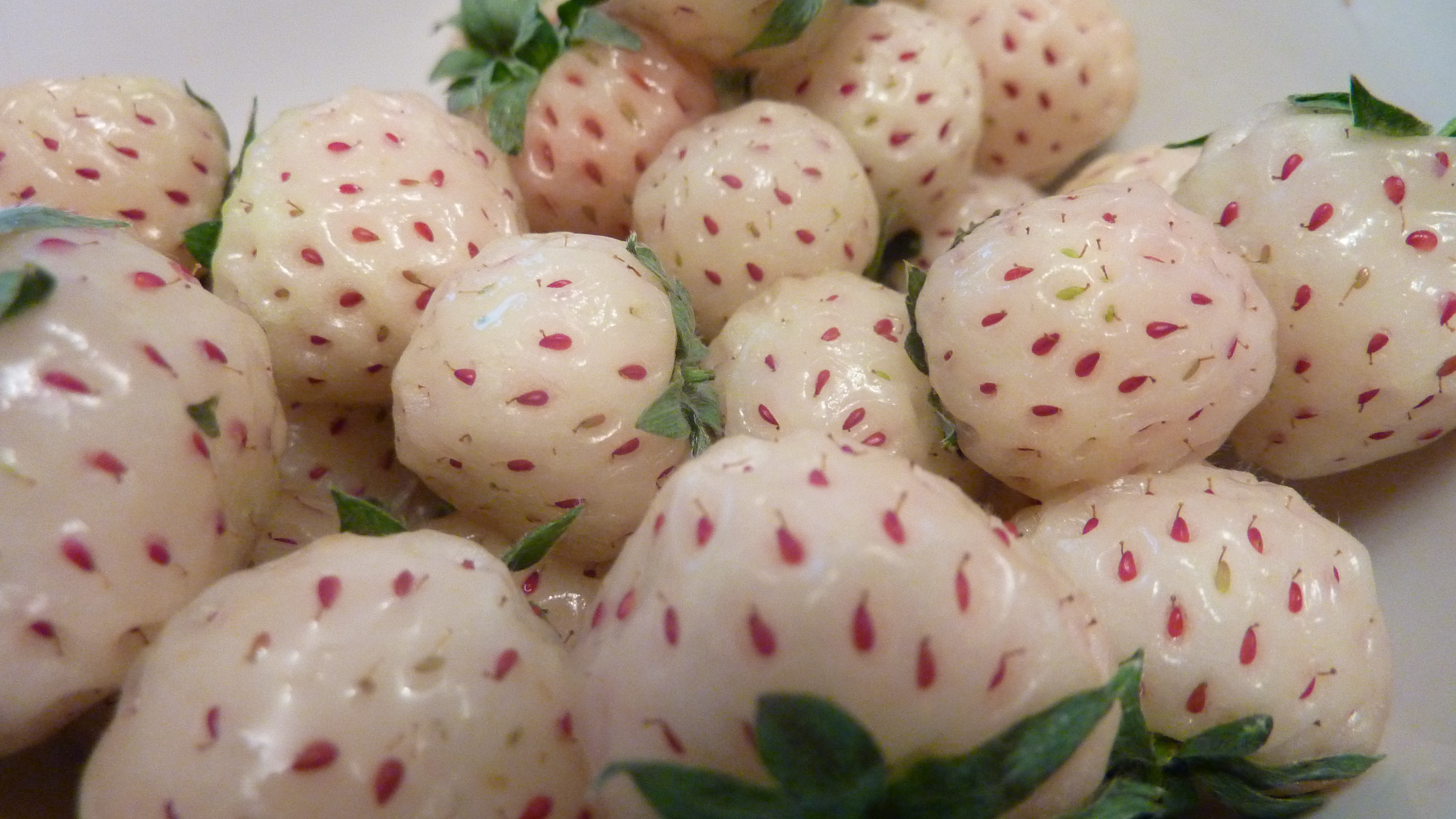
Pineberries

- List of strawberry cultivars
- Little Scarlet – according to Wilkin & Sons Limited, it is a Fragaria virginiana strawberry. It is American by origin but is grown only in Britain.
- Marshall strawberry – a cultivated variety of Fragaria ananassa, that is known for "exceptional taste and firmness" and had been described as "the finest eating strawberry" in America.
- Pineberry – a strawberry cultivar with a pineapple-like flavor, white coloring, and red seeds.
- Strasberry – or Fragaria × ananassa 'Mieze Schindler' is a variety of the garden strawberry, with a raspberry-like appearance, originally developed by the German breeder Otto Schindler in 1925.

=== Species ===
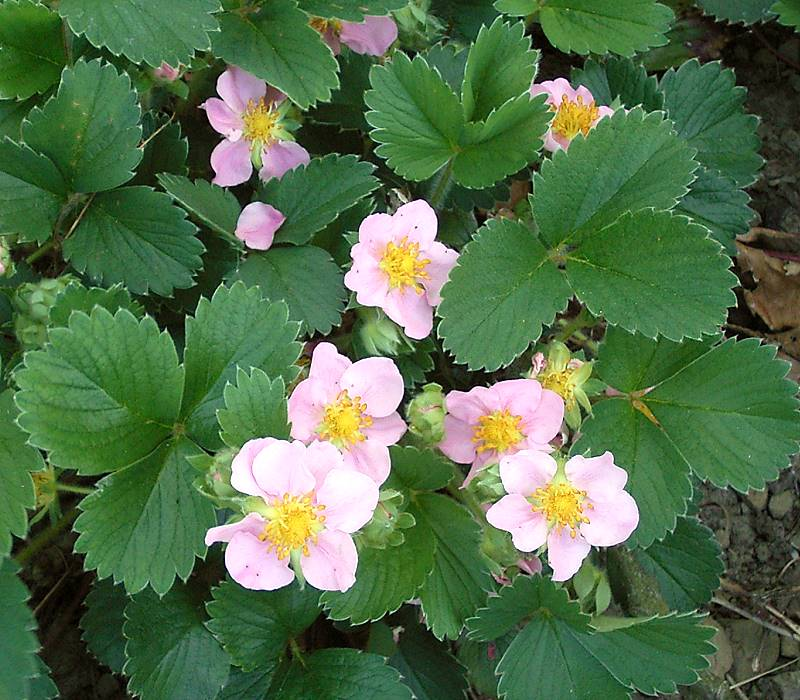
Fragaria x Comarum 'Pink Panda'

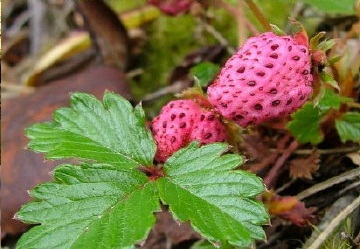
Fragaria daltoniana is a species of strawberry native to the Himalayas. Its fruit has a poor flavor, and is of no commercial value.

- Fragaria
- Fragaria × ananassa
- Fragaria × bringhurstii
- Fragaria cascadensis
- Fragaria chiloensis
- Fragaria × Comarum hybrids
- Fragaria daltoniana
- Fragaria iinumae
- Fragaria iturupensis
- Fragaria moschata
- Fragaria moupinensis
- Musk strawberry
- Fragaria nilgerrensis
- Fragaria nipponica
- Fragaria nubicola
- Fragaria orientalis
- Fragaria pentaphylla
- Fragaria vesca
- Fragaria × vescana
- Fragaria virginiana
- Fragaria viridis
- Fragaria yezoensis

== Propagation ==
- Breeding of strawberries
- List of strawberry diseases
  - Strawberry diseases (Category)
  - Strawberry pests (Category)

== Companies ==
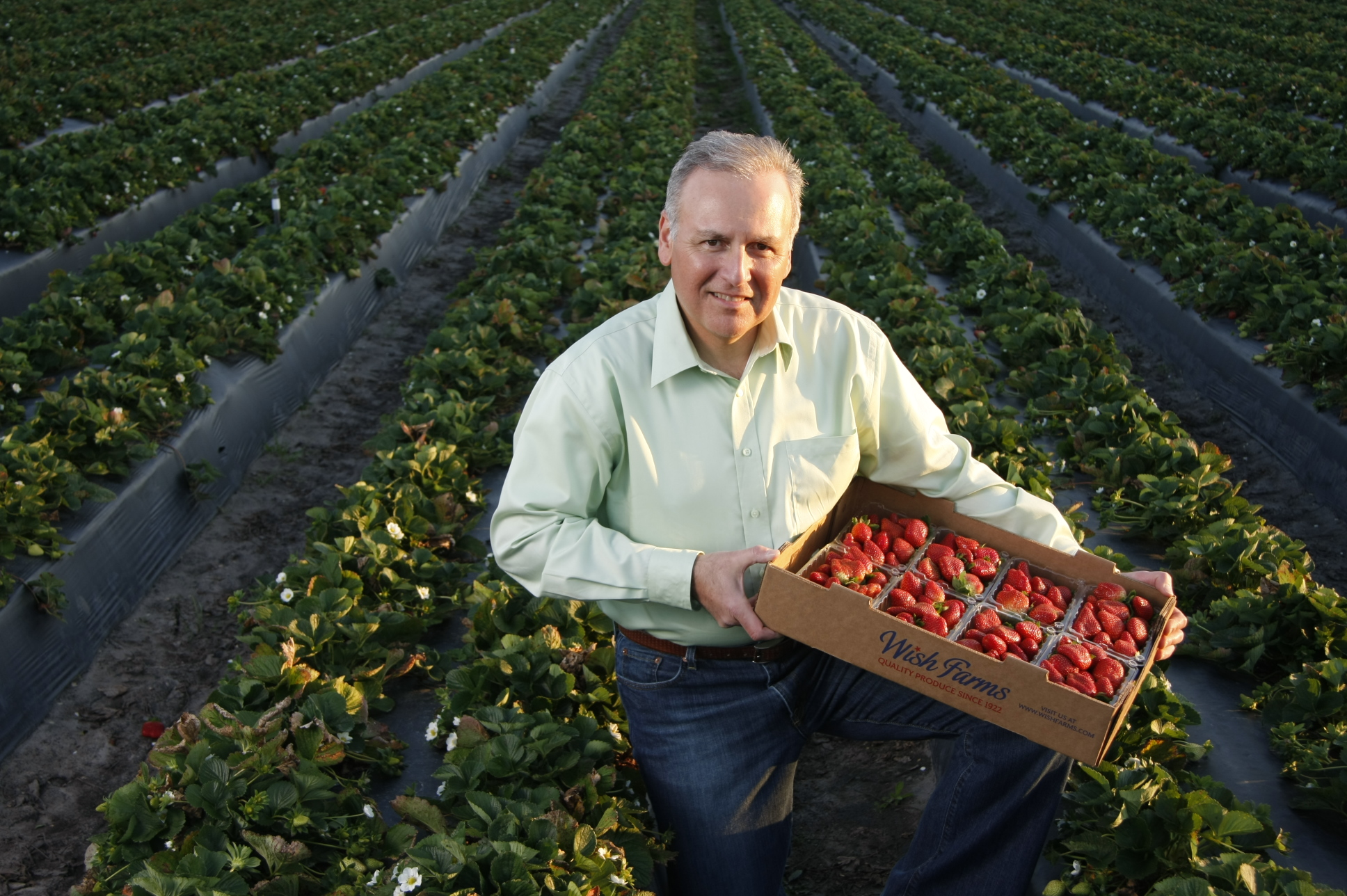
Gary Wishnatzki of Wish Farms

- Driscoll's – a privately held company that sells fresh strawberries and berries
- Wish Farms – the largest producer and shipper of strawberries in Florida

== Dishes and foods ==
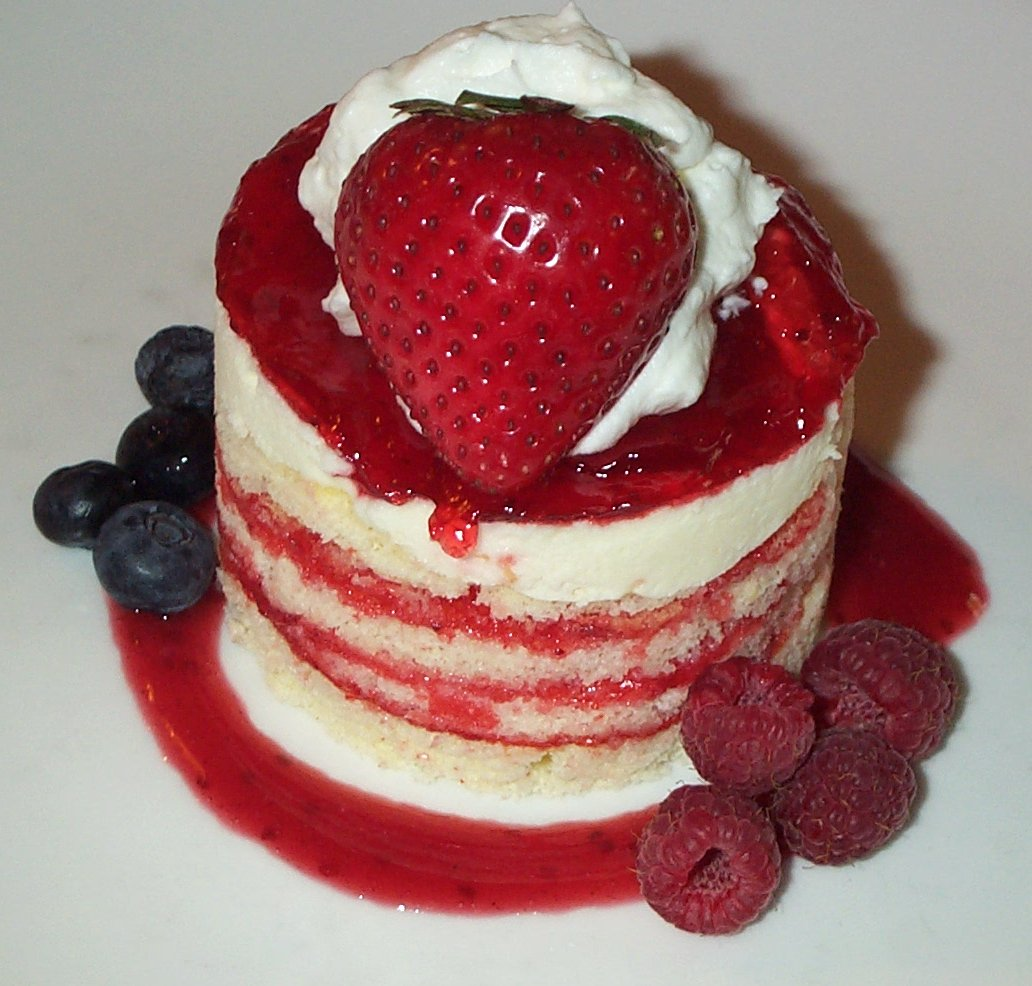
Strawberry shortcake

- Bubu Lubu
- Fraise Tagada
- Strawberry cake
- Strawberry Delight
- Strawberry ice cream
- Strawberry jam
- Strawberry pie
- Strawberry rhubarb pie
- Strawberry sauce
- Strawberry shortcake

=== Beverages ===
- Bloodhound (cocktail) – a bright red strawberry cocktail made with gin, vermouth and strawberry coulis
- Fruli – a strawberry Belgian fruit beer, produced at a craft brewery near Ghent, Belgium
- XUXU – a liqueur produced in Germany which derives its flavor from the strawberry fruit. It also has a small amount of lime juice.

== Events ==
- Florida Strawberry Festival – an annual event that takes place in Plant City, Florida
- National Strawberry Festival – occurs over three days in Belleville, Michigan
- Strawberry Fair – a local festival of music, entertainments, arts and crafts. which has been held in Cambridge, England, since 1974

== Flavor ==
- Ethyl methylphenylglycidate – an organic compound used in the flavor industry in artificial fruit flavors, in particular strawberry.

== Organizations ==
- California Strawberry Commission – state-chartered agency of the California Department of Food and Agriculture

== Strawberries in popular culture ==
=== Cities ===
- Strawberry, Arkansas
- Strawberry, Arizona

=== Artists ===
- Strawberry Runners – American rock band and recording artist
- Strawberry Switchblade – Scottish rock duo
- Strawberry Alarm Clock – American psychedelic rock band

=== Songs ===
- Strawberries (song)
- Strawberry (song)
- Strawberry Fields Forever

=== Textiles ===
- Strawberry Thief – one of William Morris's most popular repeating designs for textiles
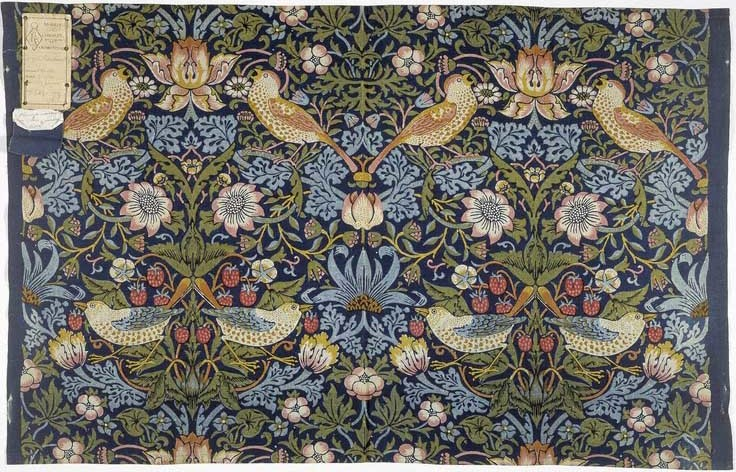
Strawberry Thief, 1883, William Morris (1834-1896) V&A Museum no. T.586-1919

=== Other ===
- Strawberry Panic! – Japanese media franchise based on a series of short stories written by Sakurako Kimino
