= Stigmella thuringiaca =

Scientific classification
- Kingdom: Animalia
- Phylum: Arthropoda
- Class: Insecta
- Order: Lepidoptera
- Family: Nepticulidae
- Genus: Stigmella
- Species: S. thuringiaca

Binomial name
- Stigmella thuringiaca (Petry, 1904)

Synonyms
- Nepticula thuringiaca Petry, 1904; Nepticula nickerli Rebel in Nickerl, 1908

Species of moth

Stigmella thuringiaca is a moth of the family Nepticulidae. It is found from Germany, Poland and central Russia to the Iberian Peninsula and Italy. It is not found on the Balkan Peninsula.

The larvae feed on Agrimonia eupatoria, Filipendula, Fragaria moschata, Fragaria vesca, Fragaria viridis, Potentilla tabernaemontani and Sanguisorba minor. They mine the leaves of their host plant.
