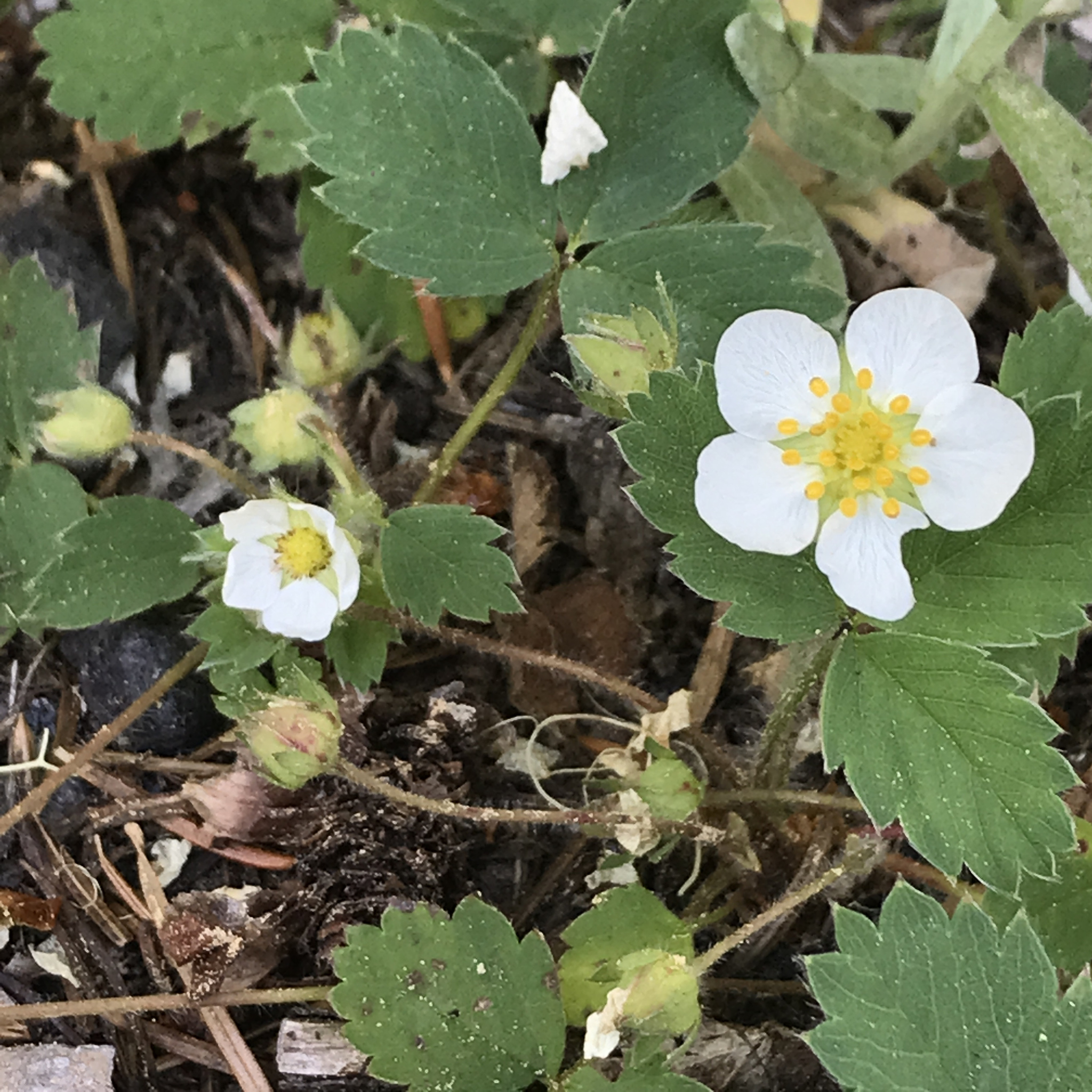

Scientific classification
- Kingdom: Plantae
- Clade: Tracheophytes
- Clade: Angiosperms
- Clade: Eudicots
- Clade: Rosids
- Order: Rosales
- Family: Rosaceae
- Genus: Fragaria
- Species: F. cascadensis

Binomial name
- Fragaria cascadensis K.E.Hummer

= Fragaria cascadensis =

Species of strawberry

Fragaria cascadensis is a species of strawberry found in the Cascades Mountains described in 2012. The vernacular name Cascade strawberry was suggested by the describing author.

== Taxonomy ==
F. cascadensis was first described in 2012 by Kim E. Hummer of the USDA ARS National Clonal Germplasm Repository in Corvallis, Oregon. The holotype plant was collected from a disturbed area along a road in Lane County Oregon. The holotype plant was in a south facing area growing in association with Pseudotsuga menziesii. The species was named Fragaria cascadensis in allusion to the Oregon Cascade Mountains.

== Description ==
It is a perennial, with the typical white flowers of its genus. It differs from other strawberry species by having hairs on the upper side of its leaves, as opposed to the underside or not present at all and a different middle leaflet. It begins growing after snow melt ( May or early June in that region), flowers are born around early July and fruit ripens during August for about 2 weeks. The fruits are about 1 cm wide, with soft flesh and a white interior. This species is a decaploid. See Fragaria.

== Distribution ==
F. cascadensis grows along the western slopes of the Oregon Cascades Mountains from the Columbia River south to Crater Lake, at elevations of about 3,000 feet up to tree line. It grows in sandy-clay loam soil of volcanic origin located in forest clearings and open alpine meadows.

== Cultivation ==
This species is not yet in cultivation. Although this species is a decaploid, unlike the octoploid common strawberry, it can be hybridized with Fragaria iturupensis, Fragaria × vescana. Fragaria × Comarum hybrids or Fragaria × bringhurstii should produce fertile offspring (although with chromosome doubling), which may reveal new flavors or genetic disease resistance.
