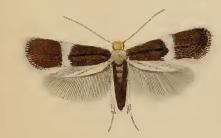

Scientific classification
- Kingdom: Animalia
- Phylum: Arthropoda
- Clade: Pancrustacea
- Class: Insecta
- Order: Lepidoptera
- Family: Nepticulidae
- Genus: Ectoedemia
- Species: E. arcuatella

Binomial name
- Ectoedemia arcuatella (Herrich-Schäffer, 1855)

Synonyms
- Nepticula arcuatella Herrich-Schäffer, 1855; Nepticula arcuata Frey, 1856; Nepticula arcuosella Doubleday, 1859

= Ectoedemia arcuatella =

Species of moth

Ectoedemia arcuatella is a moth of the family Nepticulidae, found in most of Europe (except for the Iberian Peninsula) and east to the Volga and Ural regions of Russia.

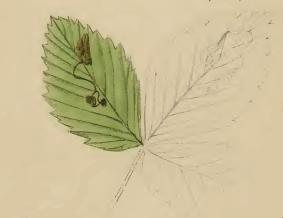
Mined leaf of Potentilla sterilis

Larva

Its wingspan measures about 5 mm. The head is ochreous-yellowish to fuscous. The antennal eyecaps are white. The forewings are blackish with an oblique, somewhat curved, shining, silvery fascia in the middle. The outer half of cilia beyond a blackish line are grey whitish. The hindwings are grey. Van Nieukerken provides a key and description.

Adults are on wing from June to July.

The larvae feed on Fragaria moschata, Fragaria vesca, Fragaria viridis, Potentilla erecta and Potentilla sterilis. They mine the leaves of their host plant.
