= P. pentaphylla =

P. pentaphylla may refer to:

- Pedicellaria pentaphylla, an annual wildflower
- Pinus pentaphylla, a white pine
- Potentilla pentaphylla, a wild strawberry
