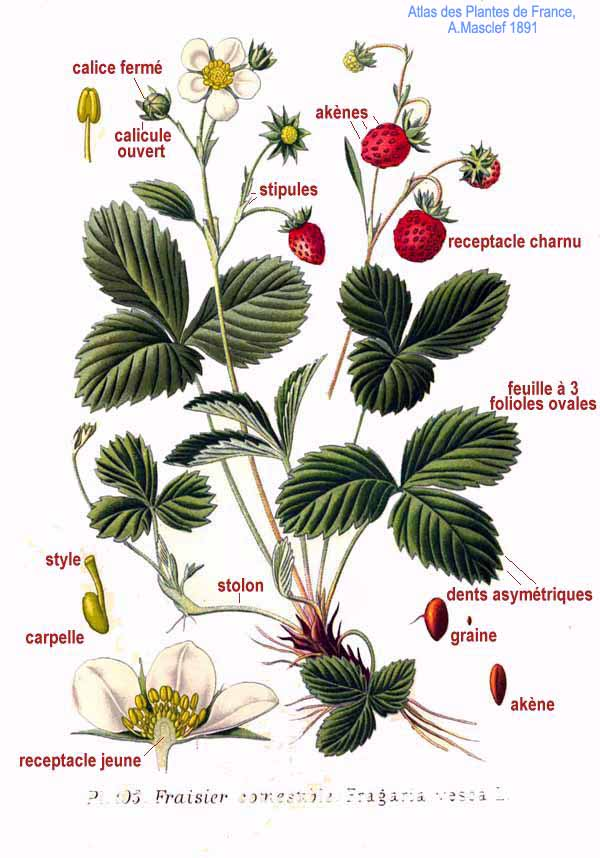
- Fragaria vesca illustration from Atlas des plantes de France 1891, by A. Masclef

Scientific classification
- Kingdom: Plantae
- Clade: Embryophytes
- Clade: Tracheophytes
- Clade: Angiosperms
- Clade: Eudicots
- Clade: Rosids
- Order: Rosales
- Family: Rosaceae
- Subfamily: Rosoideae
- Tribe: Potentilleae
- Subtribe: Fragariinae
- Genus: Fragaria; L.

Type species
- Fragaria vesca L.

Species
- 20+ species; see text

= Fragaria =

Fragaria Temporal range: Miocene–Recent

Genus of strawberry plants

Fragaria (/frəˈɡɛəri.ə/) is a genus of flowering plants in the rose family, Rosaceae, commonly known as strawberries for their edible fruits. There are more than 20 described species and many hybrids and cultivars. The most common strawberries grown commercially are cultivars of the garden strawberry, a hybrid known as Fragaria × ananassa. Strawberries have a taste that varies by cultivar, and ranges from quite sweet to rather tart. Strawberries are an important commercial fruit crop, widely grown in all temperate regions of the world.

== Description ==
Strawberries are not berries in the botanical sense. The fleshy and edible part of the "fruit" is a receptacle, and the parts that are sometimes mistakenly called "seeds" are achenes and therefore the true botanical fruits.

== Etymology ==
The genus name Fragaria derives from fragum ("strawberry") and -aria, a suffix used to create feminine nouns and plant names. The Latin name is thought in turn to derive from a Proto-Indo-European language root meaning "berry", either *dʰreh₂ǵ- or *sróh₂gs.

The semantic motivation behind the English name "strawberry" (from Old English strēawberie) is unclear. Various suggestions have been put forward. One is that the name derives from the old practice of gathering strawberries by stringing them on a straw or stalk. Alternatively, "straw" may refer to the long, thin runners found on members of the genus. The term is absent from the other Germanic languages, which instead use words meaning "earth berry".

== Classification ==
There are more than 20 different Fragaria species worldwide. A number of other species have been proposed, some of which are now recognized as subspecies. One key to the classification of strawberry species is that they vary in the number of chromosomes. They all have seven basic types of chromosomes, but exhibit different polyploidy. Some species are diploid, having two sets of the seven chromosomes (14 chromosomes total), but others are tetraploid (four sets, 28 chromosomes total), hexaploid (six sets, 42 chromosomes total), octoploid (eight sets, 56 chromosomes total), or decaploid (ten sets, 70 chromosomes total).

As a rough rule (with exceptions), strawberry species with more chromosomes tend to be more robust and produce larger plants with larger berries.

The oldest fossils confidently classifiable as Fragaria are from the Miocene of Poland. Fossilised Fragaria achenes are also known from the Pliocene of China.

=== Diploid species ===
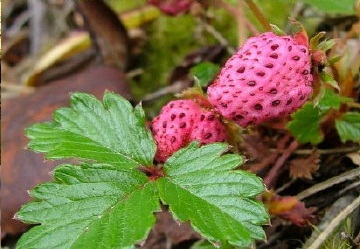
Fragaria daltoniana, a species from the Himalayas

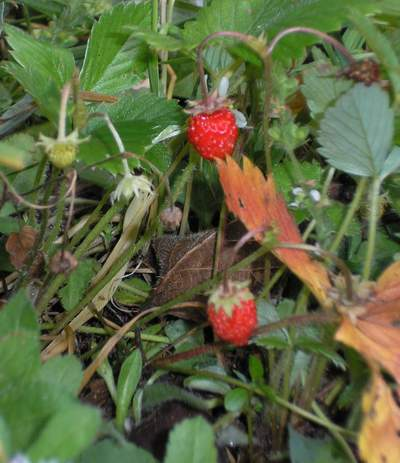
Woodland strawberry (Fragaria vesca), a Northern Hemisphere species

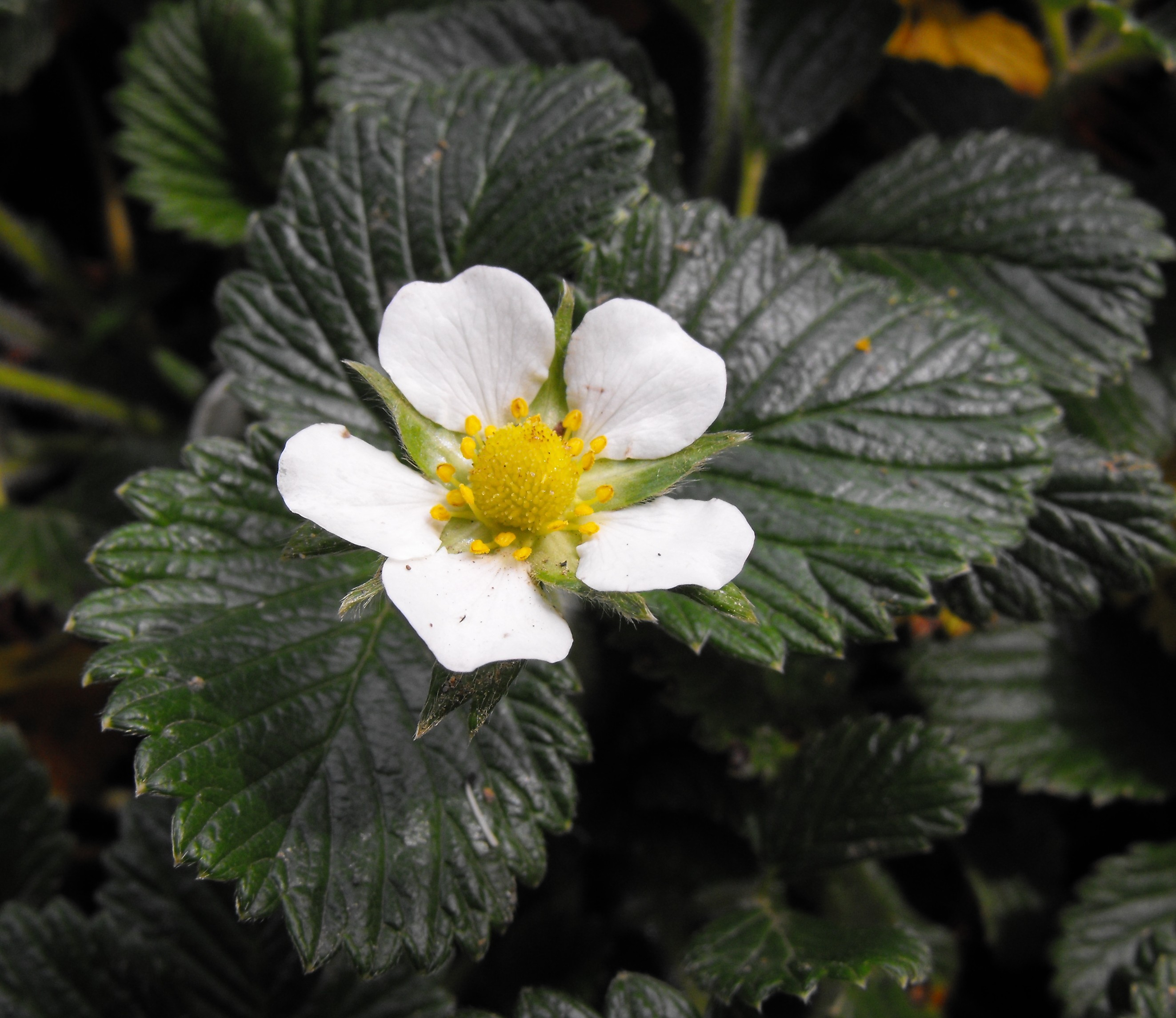
Flower of Fragaria nilgerrensis, an Asian species

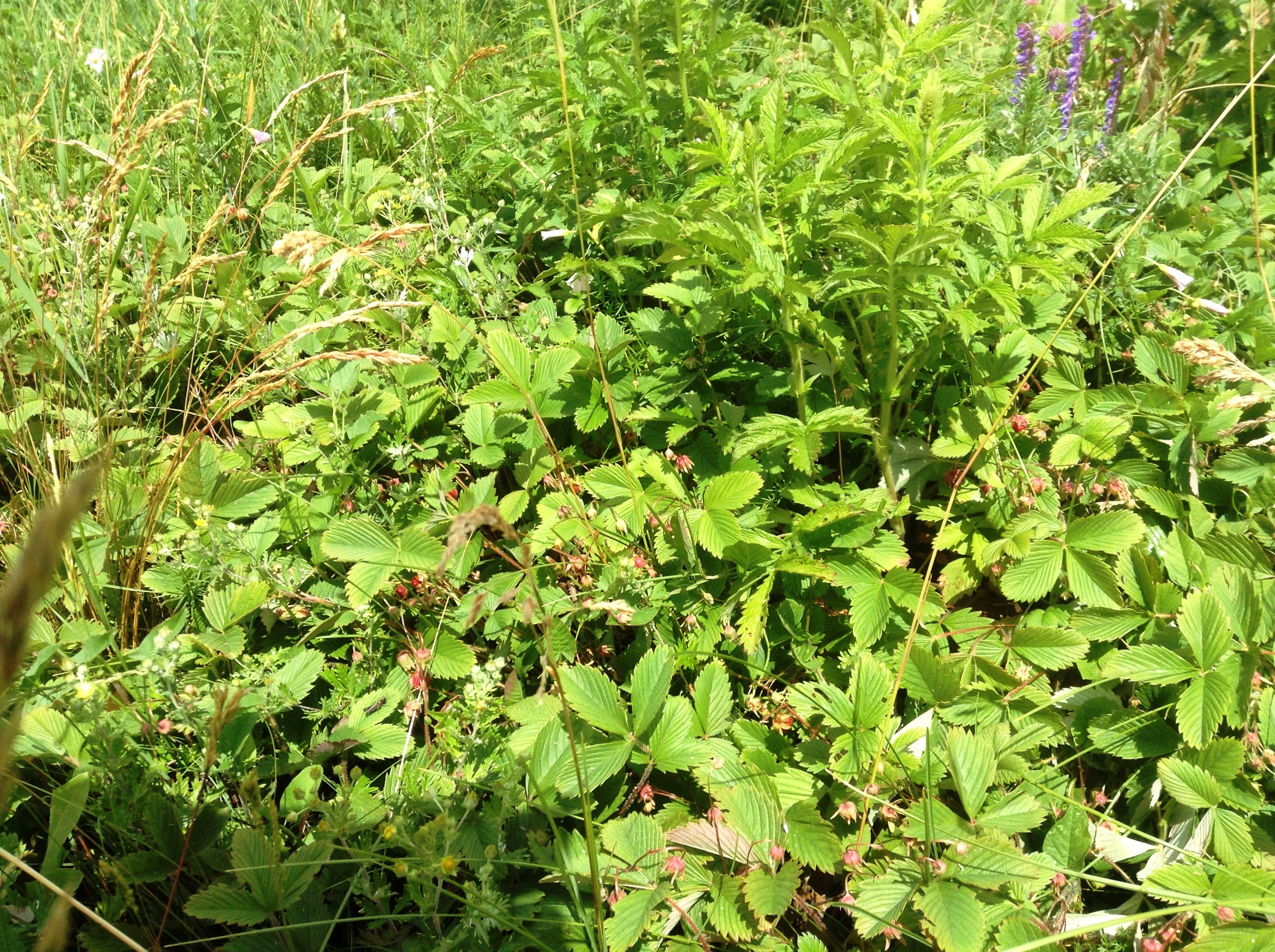
Wild strawberries (Fragaria viridis) from Sosnovka, Penza Oblast, Russia

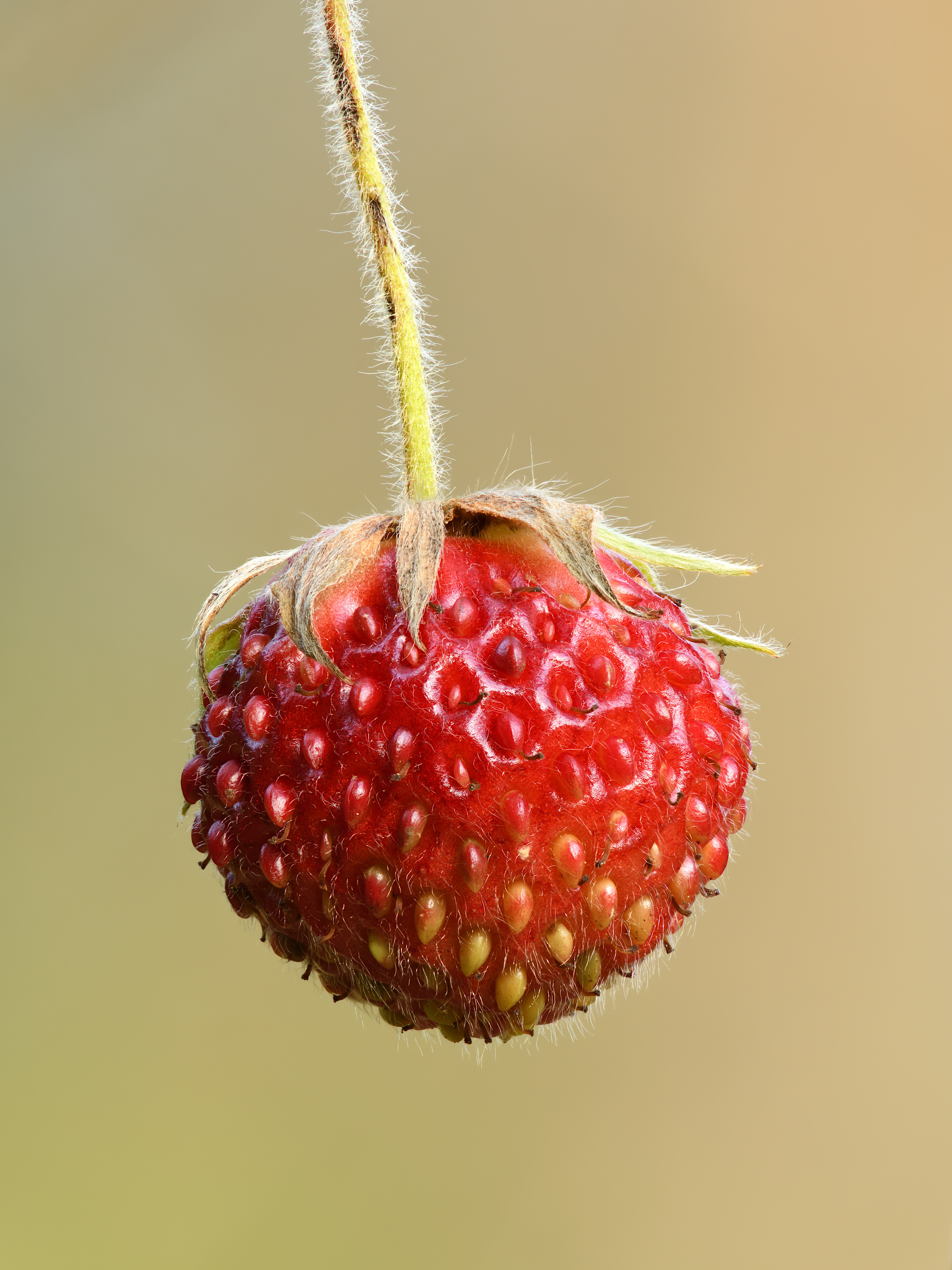
Fragaria viridis fruit photographed in Keila, Estonia

- Fragaria × bifera Duchesne - F. vesca × F. viridis (Europe)
- Fragaria bucharica Losinsk. (China)
- Fragaria chinensis Losinsk (China)
- Fragaria daltoniana J.Gay (Himalayas)
- Fragaria emeiensis Jia J. Lei (China)
- Fragaria gracilis Losinsk. (China)
- Fragaria hayatae Makino (Taiwan)
- Fragaria iinumae Makino (East Russia, Japan)
- Fragaria mandshurica Staudt (China)
- Fragaria nilgerrensis Schlecht. ex J.Gay (South and Southeast Asia)
- Fragaria nipponica Makino (Korea, Japan)
- Fragaria nubicola Lindl. ex Lacaita (Himalayas)
- Fragaria pentaphylla Losinsk. (China)
- Fragaria vesca L. - woodland strawberry (Northern Hemisphere)
- Fragaria viridis Duchesne (Europe, Central Asia)

=== Tetraploid species ===
- Fragaria corymbosa Losinsk. (northern China)
- Fragaria × intermedia (Bach) Beck (Europe)
- Fragaria moupinensis Cardot (China)
- Fragaria orientalis Losinsk. (Eastern Asia, Eastern Siberia)
- Fragaria tibetica Staudt & Dickoré (China)

=== Pentaploid hybrids ===
- Fragaria × bringhurstii Staudt (coast of California)

=== Hexaploid species ===
- Fragaria moschata Duchesne - musk strawberry (Europe)

=== Octoploid species and hybrids ===
- Fragaria × ananassa Duchesne ex Rozier - garden strawberry, pineapple strawberry
- Fragaria chiloensis (L.) Mill. - beach strawberry (Western Americas)
  - Fragaria chiloensis subsp. chiloensis forma chiloensis
  - Fragaria chiloensis subsp. chiloensis forma patagonica (Argentina, Chile)
  - Fragaria chiloensis subsp. lucida (E. Vilm. ex Gay) Staudt (coast of British Columbia, Washington, Oregon, California)
  - Fragaria chiloensis subsp. pacifica Staudt (coast of Alaska, British Columbia, Washington, Oregon, California)
  - Fragaria chiloensis subsp. sandwicensis (Decne.) Staudt - ʻōhelo papa (Hawaiʻi)
- Fragaria virginiana Mill. - Virginia strawberry (North America)

=== Decaploid species and hybrids ===
- Fragaria cascadensis K.E. Hummer (Cascade Mountains in Oregon)
- Fragaria iturupensis Staudt - Iturup strawberry (Iturup, Kuril Islands)
- Fragaria × Comarum hybrids
- Fragaria × vescana

=== Polyploidy unknown ===
- Fragaria tayulinensis S.S.Ying (Taiwan)

=== Uncategorized hybrids ===
- 'Lipstick' (Fragaria × Comarum hybrid), red-flowered runnering ornamental, sparse small globular fruits.
- Fragaria vesca and certain other diploid species can be hybridized and produce fertile offspring (although Fragaria nilgerrensis appears less compatible).
- Fragaria moschata can hybridize with diploid species such as Fragaria viridis and Fragaria nubicola but producing a lower proportion of viable seeds.
- Fragaria moschata can hybridize with Fragaria × ananassa.

== Ecology ==
A number of species of butterflies and moths feed on strawberry plants.

== See also ==
- Accessory fruit
- Mock strawberry (Duchesnea/Potentilla indica) and barren strawberry (Potentilla sterilis, Waldsteinia fragarioides) are closely related species in other genera which resemble Fragaria.
- Strawberry tree (disambiguation) is a name for several trees that are unrelated to strawberry.
- The breeding of strawberries
