= Fragaria emeiensis =

Scientific classification
- Kingdom: Plantae
- Clade: Tracheophytes
- Clade: Angiosperms
- Clade: Eudicots
- Clade: Rosids
- Order: Rosales
- Family: Rosaceae
- Genus: Fragaria
- Species: F. emeiensis

Binomial name
- Fragaria emeiensis Jia J. Lei 2021

Species of strawberry

Fragaria emeiensis is a species of strawberry native to the Emei Mountains within Sichuan Province in south-western China. This species was discovered during the construction of a pan-genome for the strawberry.

== Description ==
All strawberries have a base haploid count of 7 chromosomes. Fragaria daltoniana is diploid, having 2 pairs of these chromosomes for a total of 14 chromosomes. It is uniquely robust with thicker pinnately quinquefoliolate leaves.
