= Wish Farms =

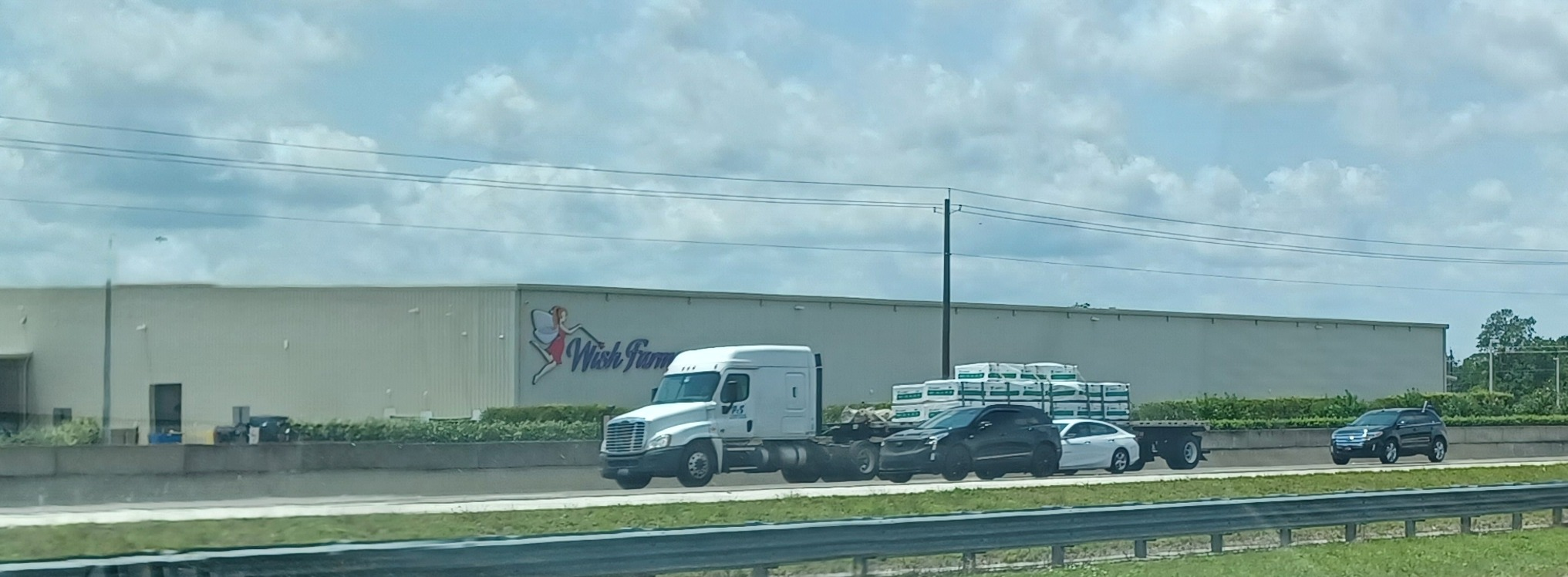
A Wish Farms warehouse in Plant City

Wish Farms is a Plant City, Florida, United States based supplier of strawberries, blueberries, raspberries and blackberries. The company was established in 1922.

== History ==
In 1922, Harris Wishnatzki teamed up with Daniel Nathel to establish Wishnatzki & Nathel, a wholesale business selling fruits and vegetables. He began to establish buying and selling in Plant City, Florida in 1929, leading to a permanent move in 1937. After Harris' death in 1955, his sons Joe and Lester took company leadership. Gary Wishnatzki became the President of Wishnatzki & Nathel in 1990. In 2001, the Wishnatzki and Nathel families split the company, with the Wishnatzkis overseeing the Florida division, which took the name Wishnatzki Farms.

Wishnatzki Farms started producing and selling frozen strawberries in 2002. The company was the first to offer organic strawberries grown in the state of Florida on a commercial scale in 2005. By 2010, Wishnatzki Farms rebranded itself as Wish Farms with the mascot “Misty the Garden Pixie”. Since 2010, Wish Farms has been the official sponsor of the Florida Strawberry Festival’s Soundstage, an event stage for concert performances. In efforts to solve the farm labor shortage, Gary Wishnatzki founded Harvest CROO Robotics in 2013, developing an automated strawberry picker.

== Products ==
Wish Farms is a supplier of conventional and organic varieties of strawberries, blueberries, blackberries, and raspberries. Wish Farms grows berries across North and South America including Florida, Georgia, North Carolina, New Jersey, Michigan, California, Canada, Mexico, Chile, Argentina and Peru. It began growing organic strawberries in Duette in 2005, and produced 90 percent of Florida’s organic strawberry production in 2018.

In 2014, they expanded their organic supply to a year-round commodity by producing organic strawberries in California and organic blueberries in Florida. The company opened an organic blueberry operation in 2016 under the name Misty Organics in Alturas, Florida. It started production in 2018 whereby the berries were grown in containers under cover, to allow for a harvest window between the South American and Southeastern United States harvests.
