= Strawberry Runners =

American rock band

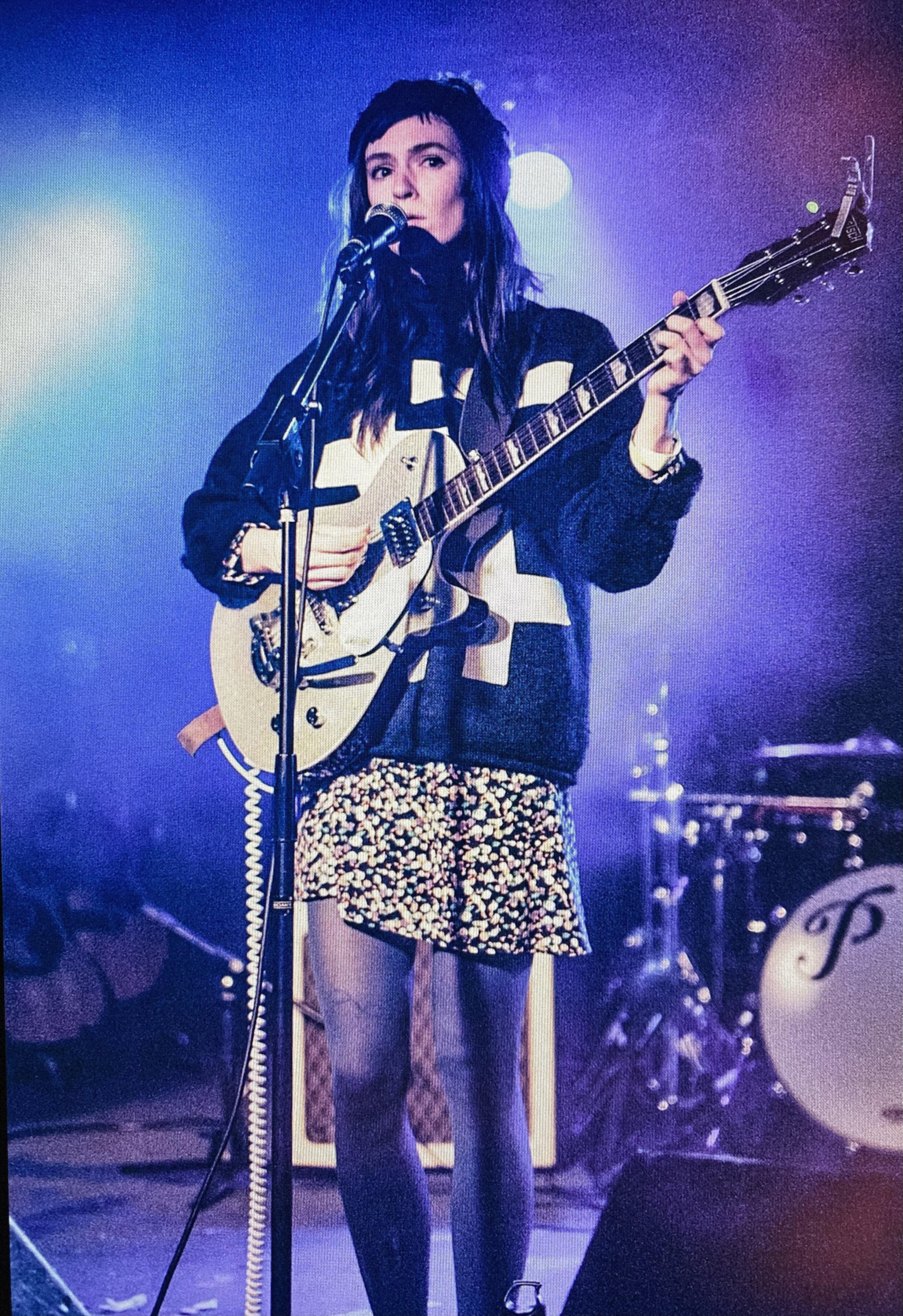

Background information
- Also known as: Summer Salt
- Origin: Denver, Colorado, U.S.
- Genres: folk, alternative, rock
- Years active: 2013–present
- Label: Salinas Records
- Members: Emi Night
- Website: https://strawberryrunners.bandcamp.com

Strawberry Runners is an American rock band, and the primary music project of songwriter and artist, Emi Night.

== History ==
The band started in Denver, Colorado and is now based primarily in Brooklyn. The narrative songwriting of Night's early songs tell the story of their experience growing up in the Ohio River Valley. Originally named "Summer Salt", the band made their debut in Bloomington, Indiana in the summer of 2011. Night played a handful of solo concerts under this name throughout 2011 and 2012, before reforming the band and officially changing their name in 2013.

Strawberry Runners was named "One of Ten Bands About to Blow Up" by Wired in 2015, after making NPR's Austin 100 list ahead of the 2015 SXSW music festival.

== Discography ==
- The Places You Call Home (as Summer Salt) – self-released, Discount Horse Records LP
- Hatcher Creek Tape (2015) – self-released, two-sided single
- In the Garden, in the Night (2017) – Salinas Records EP
- Happy Birthday (Demos 2017–2020) (2021) – self-released EP
- Strawberry Runners (2023) – debut full-length
