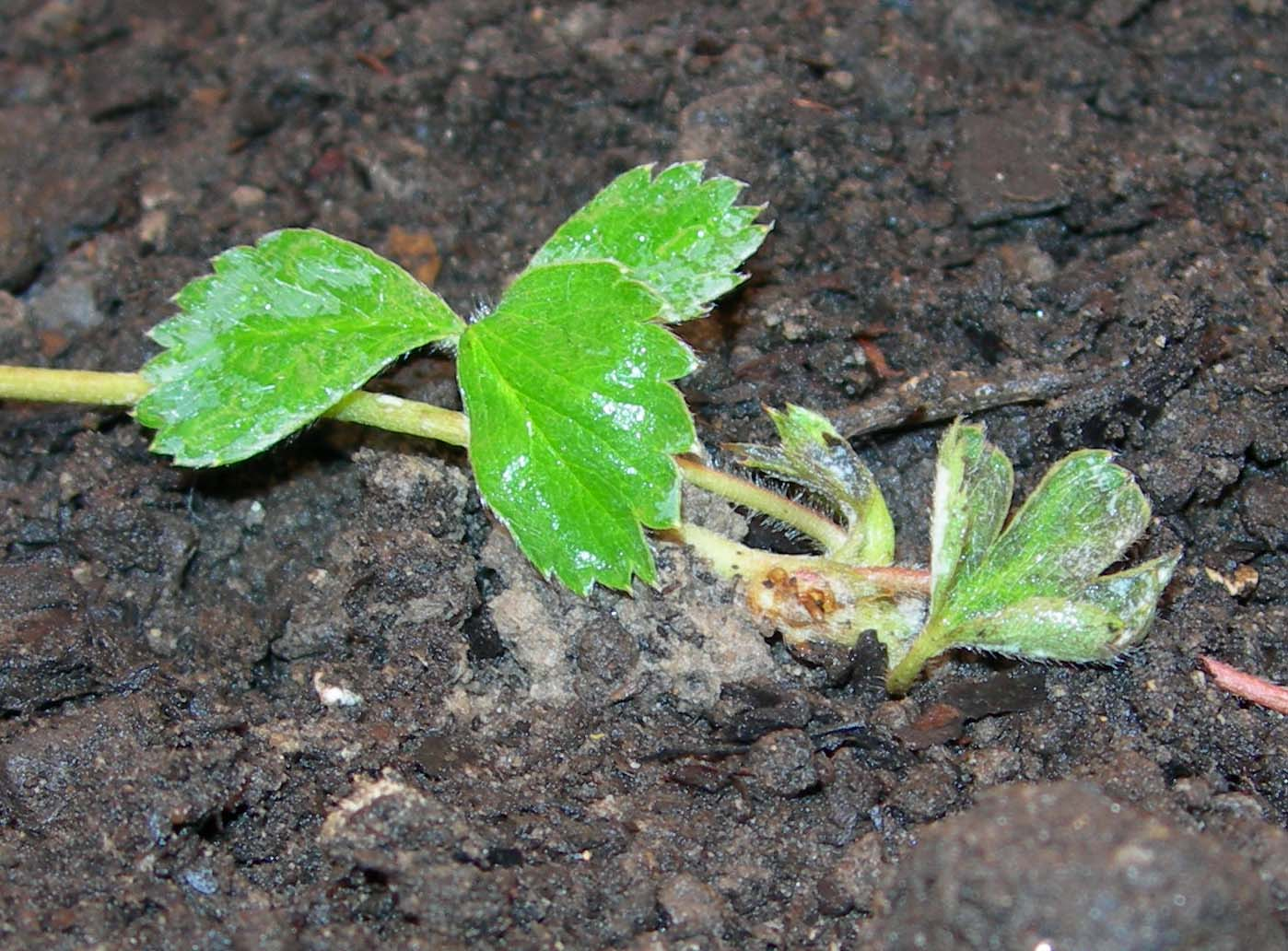

Scientific classification
- Kingdom: Plantae
- Clade: Tracheophytes
- Clade: Angiosperms
- Clade: Eudicots
- Clade: Rosids
- Order: Rosales
- Family: Rosaceae
- Genus: Fragaria
- Species: F. iturupensis

Binomial name
- Fragaria iturupensis Staudt

= Fragaria iturupensis =

Species of strawberry

Fragaria iturupensis, the Iturup strawberry, is a species of wild strawberry, endemic to Iturup in the Kuril Islands. It is noted to have relatively large berries for a wild species, similar in appearance to those of Fragaria virginiana.

== Polyploidy ==
All strawberries have a base haploid count of 7 chromosomes. Fragaria iturupensis was initially reported as octoploid (with 8 sets of chromosomes, 56 in total), but subsequent testing found decaploids (with ten sets of chromosomes, a total of 70). It is unclear whether the earlier report was an error, or whether two forms exist.
