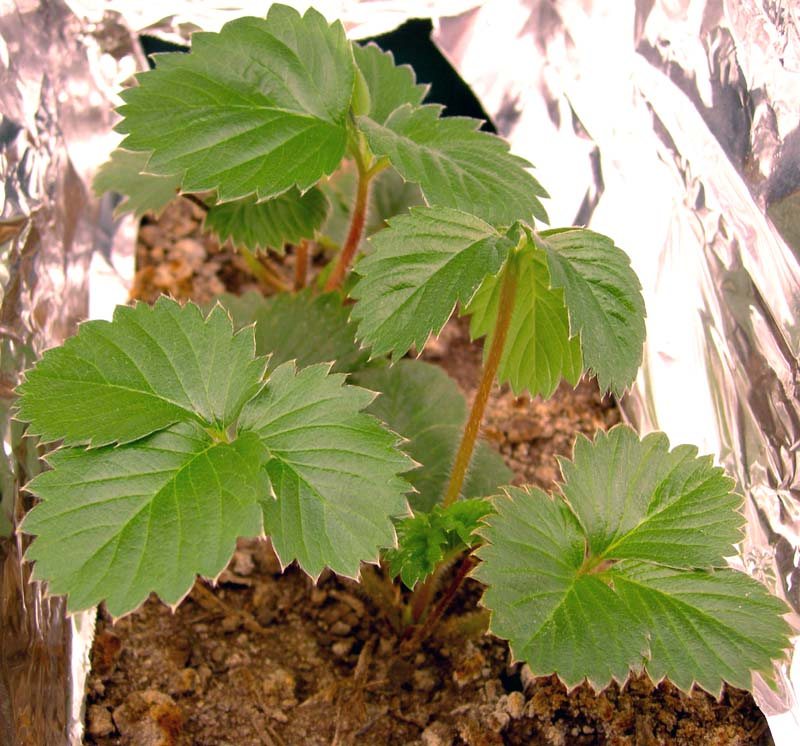

Scientific classification
- Kingdom: Plantae
- Clade: Tracheophytes
- Clade: Angiosperms
- Clade: Eudicots
- Clade: Rosids
- Order: Rosales
- Family: Rosaceae
- Genus: Fragaria
- Species: F. × vescana

Binomial name
- Fragaria × vescana Rud.Bauer & A.Bauer

= Fragaria × vescana =

Hybrid strawberry

Fragaria × vescana is a hybrid strawberry cultivar that was created in an effort to combine the best traits of the garden strawberry (Fragaria × ananassa), which has large berries and vigorous plants, with the woodland strawberry (Fragaria vesca), which has an exquisite flavour, but small berries. Plants of the World Online considers it an unplaced taxon – "names that cannot be accepted, nor can they be put into synonymy."

This cross cannot take place naturally. Fragaria × ananassa has eight sets of chromosomes whereas Fragaria vesca has only two sets. Repeated attempts to cross these resulted in sterile offspring.

Researchers treated tissue from a Fragaria vesca plant with colchicine to create a mutant plant with four sets of chromosomes. This mutant was then crossed with a Fragaria × ananassa plant, and vigorous fertile offspring were obtained. The offspring were found to be decaploid, (having ten sets of chromosomes).

Fragaria × vescana is not yet commercially important, but remains under development. While the plants are vigorous like their F. × ananassa parents, and the berries have the excellent flavour of the F. vesca parents, the berries are still quite small.

== Fragaria × vescana cultivars ==
The following decaploid strawberries were released by the Swedish breeding program at Balsgård:

- 'Annelie' (1977)
- 'Sara' (1988) — 'Annelie' × [('Sparkle' × F. vesca 4×) open pollinated]
- 'Rebecka' (1998) — ('Fern' × F. vesca 4×) × F. × ananassa F861502

German F. × vescana cultivars:

- 'Spadeka' (1977)
- 'Florika' (1989) — ('Sparkle' × F. vesca 'Semperflorens' 4x) × 'Klettererdbeere Hummi'
