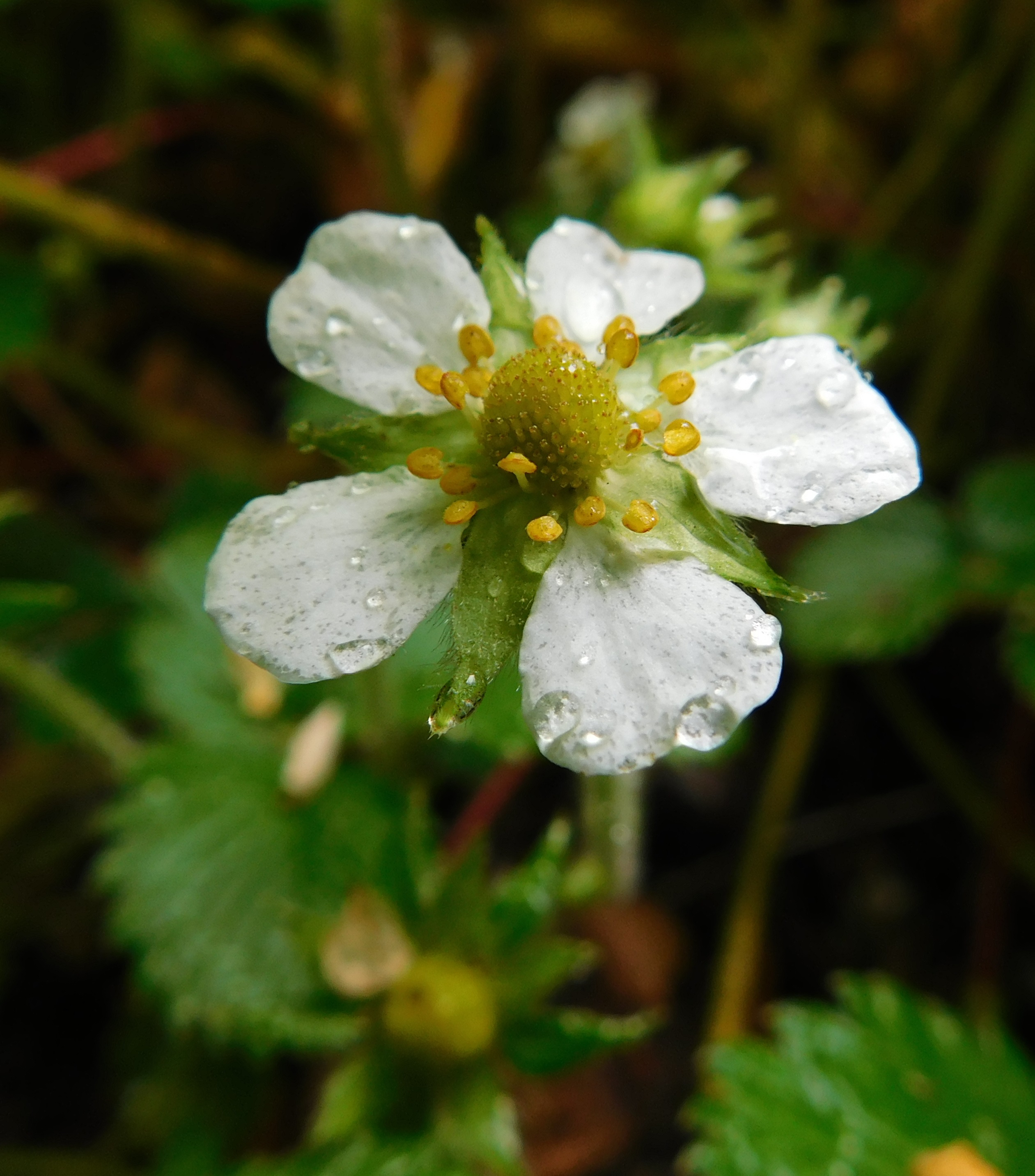

Scientific classification
- Kingdom: Plantae
- Clade: Tracheophytes
- Clade: Angiosperms
- Clade: Eudicots
- Clade: Rosids
- Order: Rosales
- Family: Rosaceae
- Genus: Fragaria
- Species: F. moupinensis

Binomial name
- Fragaria moupinensis Cardot

= Fragaria moupinensis =

Species of strawberry

Fragaria moupinensis is a species of wild strawberry native to China. It is similar in appearance to F. nilgerrensis.

All strawberries have a base monoploid count of 7 chromosomes. Fragaria moupinensis is tetraploid, having 4 pairs of these chromosomes for a total of 28 chromosomes.
