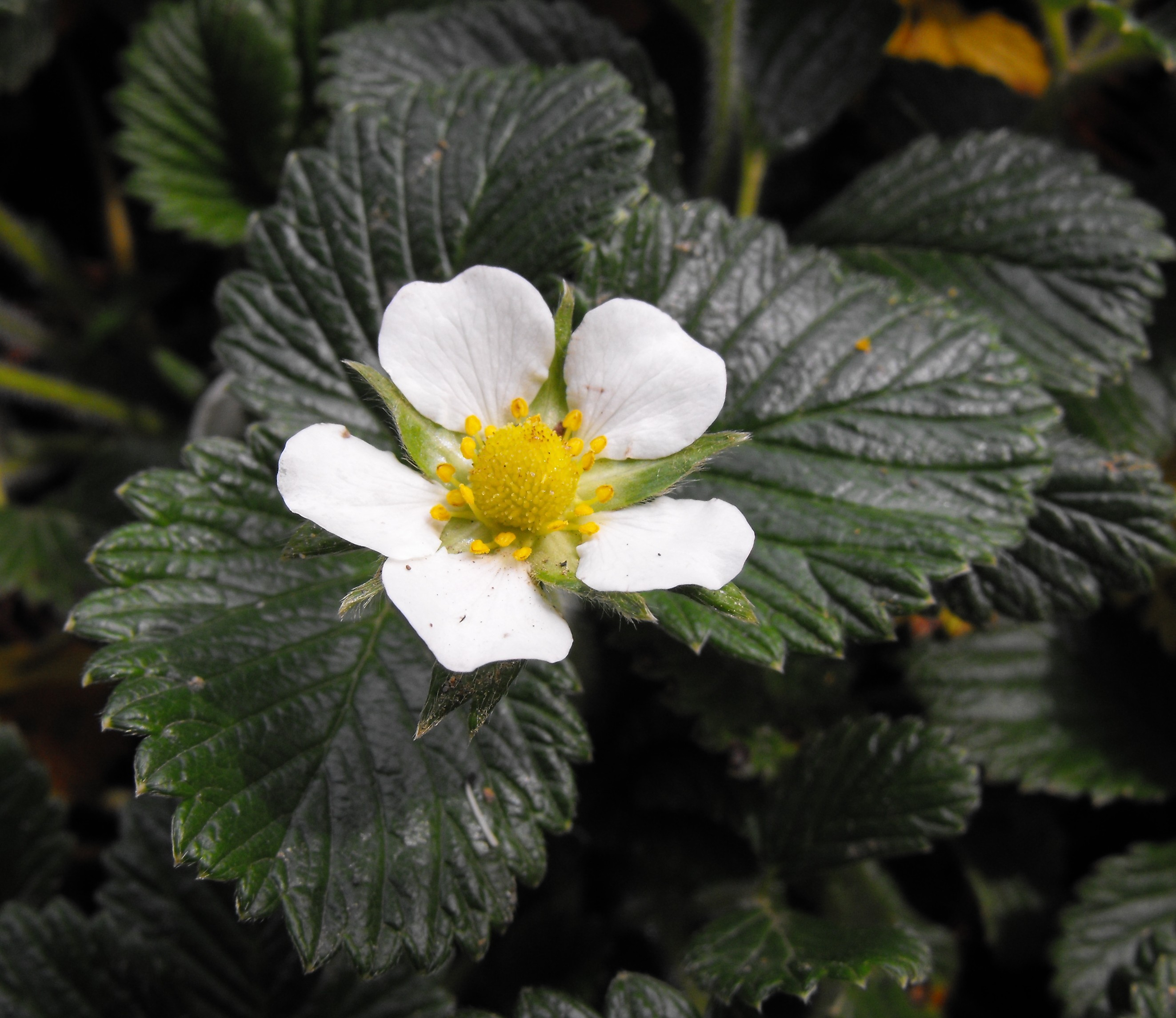

Scientific classification
- Kingdom: Plantae
- Clade: Tracheophytes
- Clade: Angiosperms
- Clade: Eudicots
- Clade: Rosids
- Order: Rosales
- Family: Rosaceae
- Genus: Fragaria
- Species: F. nilgerrensis

Binomial name
- Fragaria nilgerrensis Schlecht. ex J.Gay

Synonyms
- Potentilla nilgerrensis (Schltdl. ex J.Gay) Mabb.

= Fragaria nilgerrensis =

Nilgiri Strawberry

Species of strawberry

Fragaria nilgerrensis, the nilgiri strawberry, is a species of flowering plant in the family Rosaceae. It is a wild strawberry native to southern and southeast Asia. It is similar in appearance to F. moupinensis. Its fruit are white to light pink, with flavour reminiscent of peach, and the fruit is of no commercial value.

All strawberries have a base haploid count of 7 chromosomes. Fragaria nilgerrensis is diploid, having 2 pairs of these chromosomes for a total of 14 chromosomes.
