= Fragaria pentaphylla =

Scientific classification
- Kingdom: Plantae
- Clade: Tracheophytes
- Clade: Angiosperms
- Clade: Eudicots
- Clade: Rosids
- Order: Rosales
- Family: Rosaceae
- Genus: Fragaria
- Species: F. pentaphylla

Binomial name
- Fragaria pentaphylla Losinsk.

Synonyms
- Potentilla pentaphylla

Species of strawberry

Fragaria pentaphylla is a tetraploid species of wild strawberry native to China. In Chinese, it is called the "five-leaf strawberry" (simplified Chinese: 五叶草莓; traditional Chinese: 五葉草莓; pinyin: wǔyè cǎoméi).

== Description ==
Usually 6–15 cm tall, this species usually blooms around April to May, the fruits are ripe by June. Characteristics include:

- Thick leaves with 5 leaflets (2 auxiliary leaflets and 3 terminal leaflets)
- Hemispheric fruit, sometimes white (f. alba)
- Glabrous above, sparsely hairy beneath
- Reflexed petals
- Flowers mostly in ones or in pairs- rarely in 3's.

== Distribution ==
Fragaria pentaphylla is native to the Chinese provinces of Sichuan Qinghai Gansu Shanxi and Henan. It is most often found on forests, forest clearings, scrub, mountain meadows, and open gravels at elevations of 1000–2700 m.

== Cultivation ==
This species is rare, (if at all) in cultivation.

== Commercial value ==
This plant has little or no commercial value. However, with chromosome doubling, this plant can be bred with Fragaria × ananassa, the garden strawberry, possibly introducing new traits, such as disease resistance or new flavors (especially f. alba) to cultivated strawberries.
