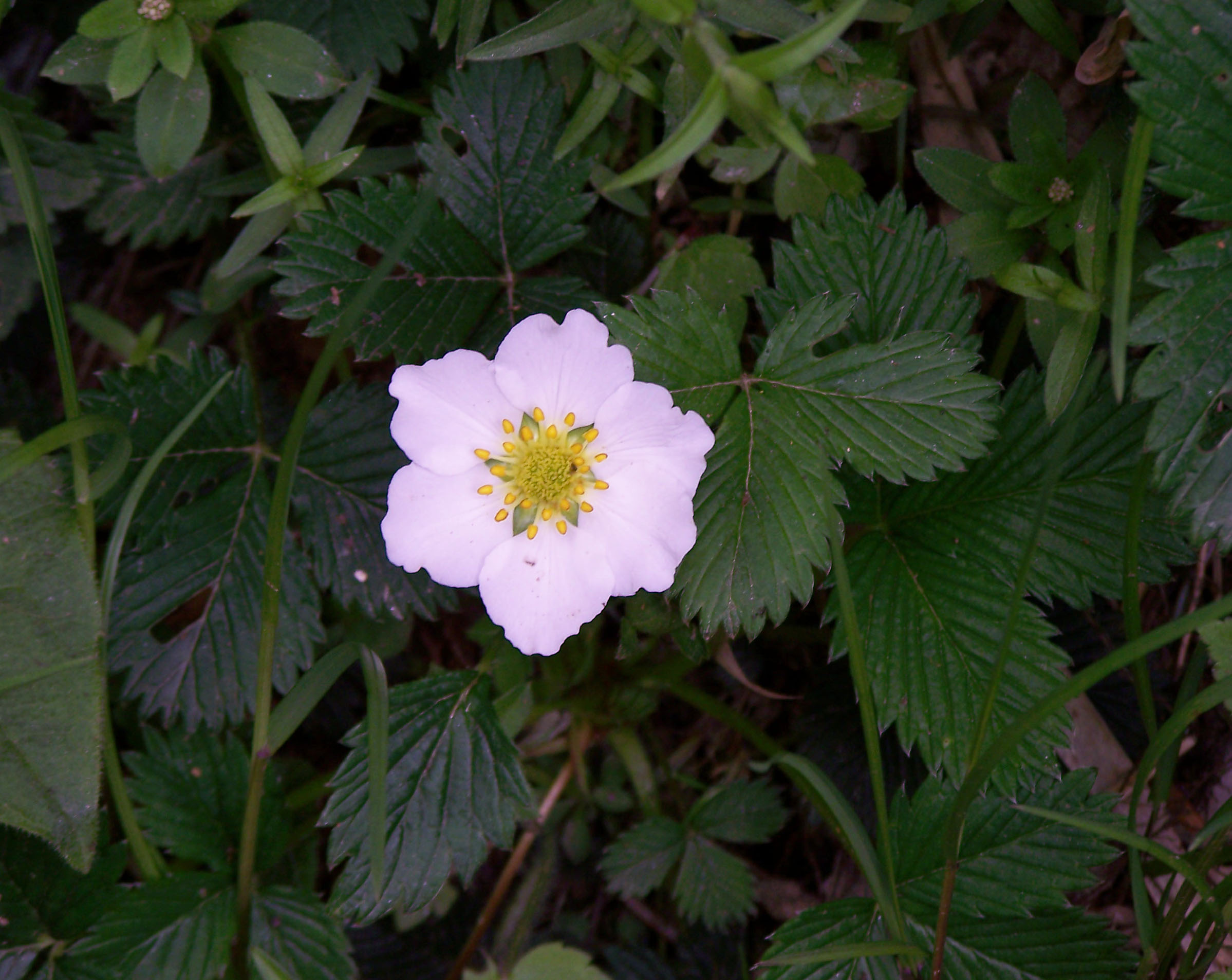

Scientific classification
- Kingdom: Plantae
- Clade: Tracheophytes
- Clade: Angiosperms
- Clade: Eudicots
- Clade: Rosids
- Order: Rosales
- Family: Rosaceae
- Genus: Fragaria
- Species: F. nubicola

Binomial name
- Fragaria nubicola Lindl. ex Lacaita

= Fragaria nubicola =

Species of strawberry

Fragaria nubicola is a species of wild strawberry native to the Himalayas. It is of no commercial value.

== Medicinal usage ==
Leaf extracts from Fragaria Nubicola have shown promising but limited results in reducing inflammation in joints, which could prove to be a possible treatment for arthritis. Studies have only been done on animals and have yet to be tested on humans, but historical anecdotes and animal testing are promising.

== Genomics ==
All strawberries have a base haploid count of 7 chromosomes. Fragaria nubicola is diploid, having 2 pairs of these chromosomes for a total of 14 chromosomes.

Genomic information
- NCBI ID: 60188
- Ploidy: diploid
- Number of chromosomes: 14
- Year of completion: 2014
