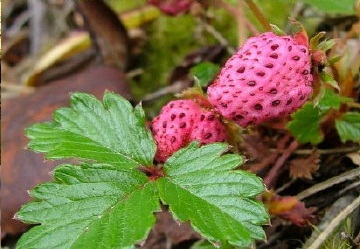

Scientific classification
- Kingdom: Plantae
- Clade: Tracheophytes
- Clade: Angiosperms
- Clade: Eudicots
- Clade: Rosids
- Order: Rosales
- Family: Rosaceae
- Genus: Fragaria
- Species: F. daltoniana

Binomial name
- Fragaria daltoniana J.Gay

Synonyms
- Potentilla daltoniana (J.Gay) Mabb.; Fragaria rubiginosa Lacaita; Fragaria sikkimensis Kurz

= Fragaria daltoniana =

Species of strawberry

Fragaria daltoniana is a species of flowering plant in the family Rosaceae. It is a strawberry native to the Himalayas. Its fruit has a poor flavor, and is of no commercial value.

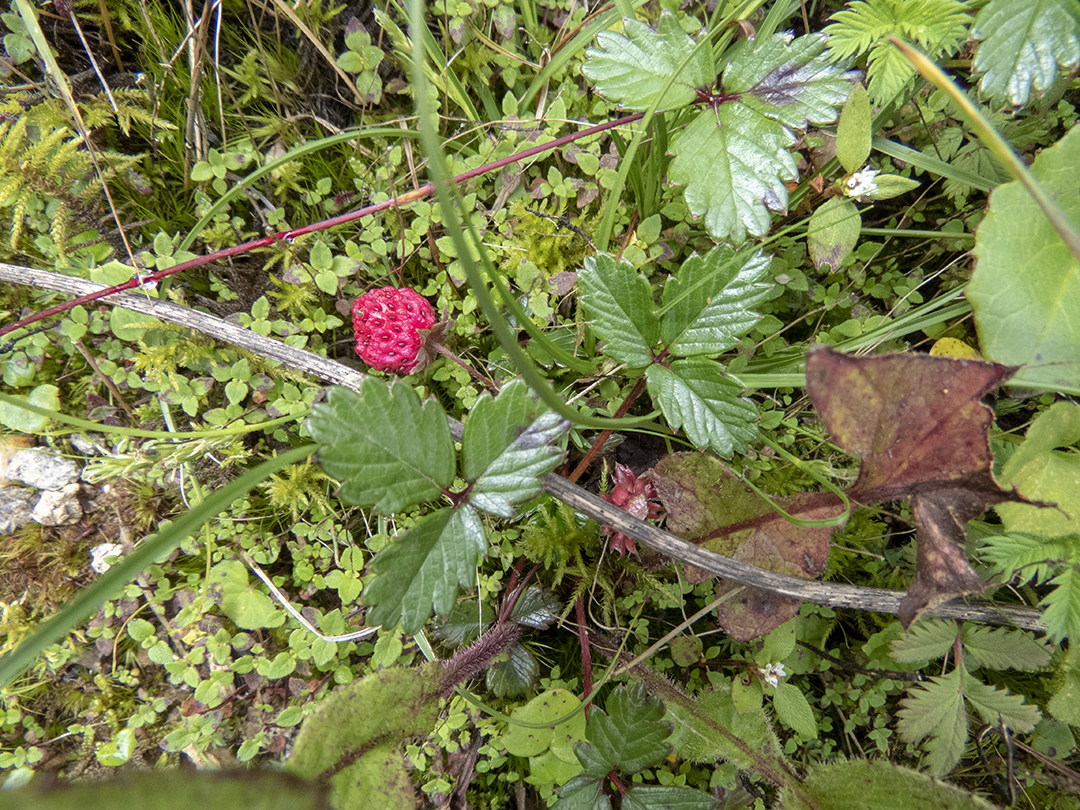
In Nepal

All strawberries have a base haploid count of 7 chromosomes. Fragaria daltoniana is diploid, having 2 pairs of these chromosomes for a total of 14 chromosomes. Fragaria daltoniana is one of the two Fragaria species containing a genome that is cold-resistant that can improve the growth and yielding of garden strawberry crops from abiotic stress.
