= Fragaria × bringhurstii =

Scientific classification
- Kingdom: Plantae
- Clade: Tracheophytes
- Clade: Angiosperms
- Clade: Eudicots
- Clade: Rosids
- Order: Rosales
- Family: Rosaceae
- Genus: Fragaria
- Species: F. × bringhurstii

Binomial name
- Fragaria × bringhurstii Staudt

Hybrid strawberry

Fragaria × bringhurstii is a naturally occurring hybrid species of wild strawberry native to the West Coast of the United States. The species results from the natural intercrossing of Fragaria vesca and Fragaria chiloensis, native species whose ranges overlap in that region.

All strawberries have a base haploid count of 7 chromosomes. Fragaria × bringhurstii is pentaploid, having 5 pairs of these chromosomes for a total of 35 chromosomes, 7 from the F. vesca parent, and 28 from the F. chiloensis parent. Because of this odd number of chromosomes, this species possesses only limited fertility, due to problems of chromosome pairing during meiosis. However the plants readily reproduce vegetatively through runnering.
