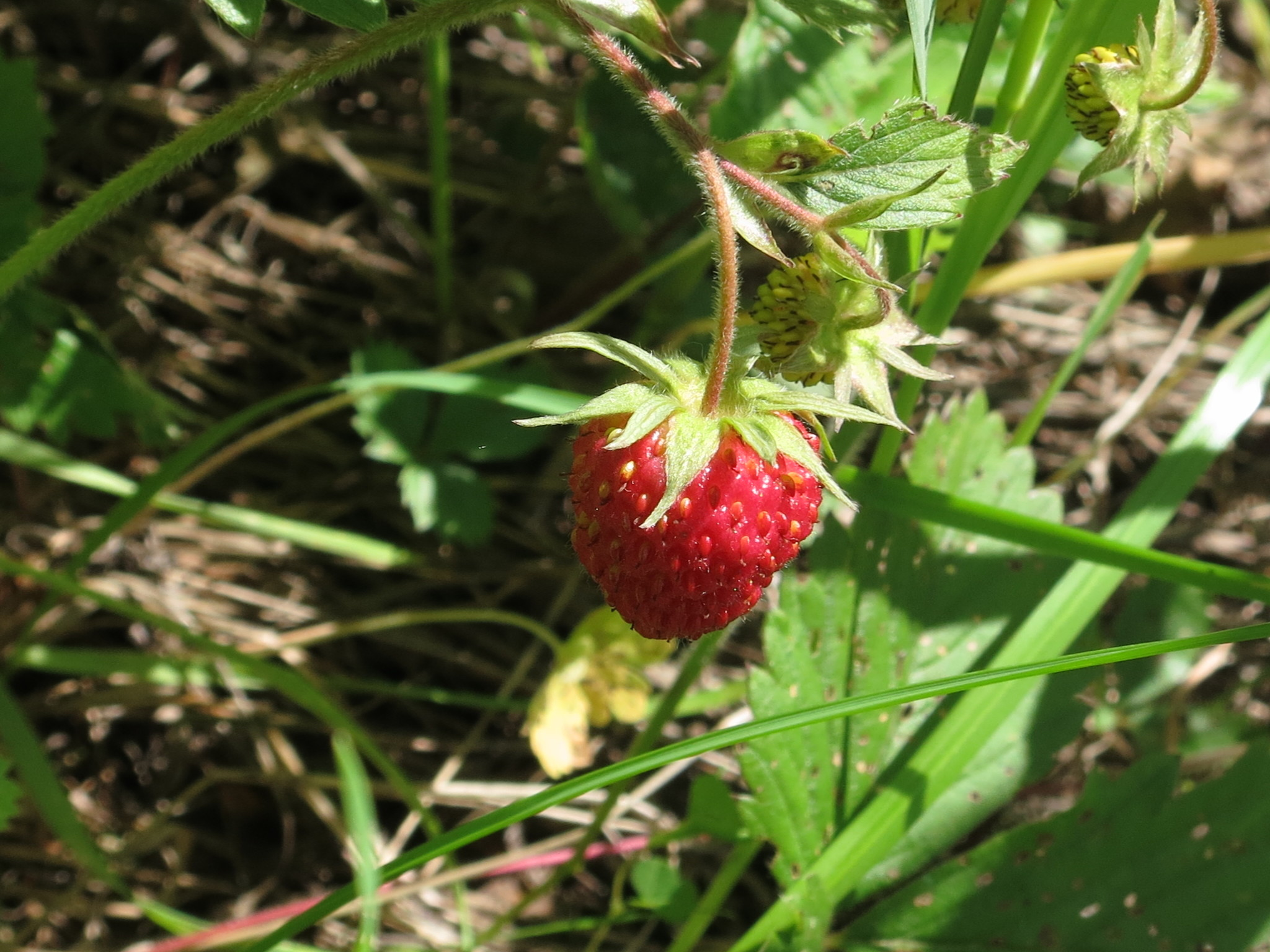

Scientific classification
- Kingdom: Plantae
- Clade: Tracheophytes
- Clade: Angiosperms
- Clade: Eudicots
- Clade: Rosids
- Order: Rosales
- Family: Rosaceae
- Genus: Fragaria
- Species: F. orientalis

Binomial name
- Fragaria orientalis Losinsk.

= Fragaria orientalis =

Species of strawberry

Fragaria orientalis is a tetraploid species of wild strawberry native to E. Asia – Eastern Siberia. It is occasionally cultivated as a novelty edible.

== Key features ==
Fragaria orientalis is a perennial, averaging 8 in (.2m) tall; it blooms from Apr to May. It vigorously produces runners, like many herbaceous members of Fragariinae.

=== Distinguishing features ===
- Fruit ripen purple-red with deeply inset ovoid achenes
- Hemispheric to obviate fruit
- Leaflets highly variable- 1–5 × 0.8–3.5 cm
- obovate or rhombic-ovate shape with slightly acute (pointed) tip
- abaxially pilose (fuzzy on the underside), especially near veins, slightly adaxial (near the stem/major midrib) pilose
- cuneate central leaflets, lateral (side) leaflets oblique (asymmetric)
- Flowers bisexual, rarely unisexual, 1–1.5 cm in diameter

== Cultivation ==
This plant is cultivated as an edible herb, although it is relatively rare in cultivation. Plants for a Future offers a preliminary method of cultivation. Prefers a sunny position with moist, fertile soil for maximum production. However, plants can tolerate partial shade. Fragaria orientalis prefers a mulch of coniferous needles. They can be vigorous, spreading via runners. There is little invasive threat.

== Distribution ==
Fragaria orientalis is native to China and eastern Siberia, specifically the Chinese provinces of Gansu, Hebei, Heilongjiang, Jilin, Liaoning, Nei Mongol, Qinghai, Shaanxi, Shanxi, as well as in Korea, Mongolia, and eastern Russia. These plants can be found in forests and meadows on mountain slopes, usually in the shade of forest trees at elevations of 600 – 4000 meters.

== Numismatics ==
Fragaria orientalis is depicted on the Mongolian postage stamps of 1968 (face value is 30 Mongolian möngö) and 1987 (face value is 1.20 Mongolian tögrög)
