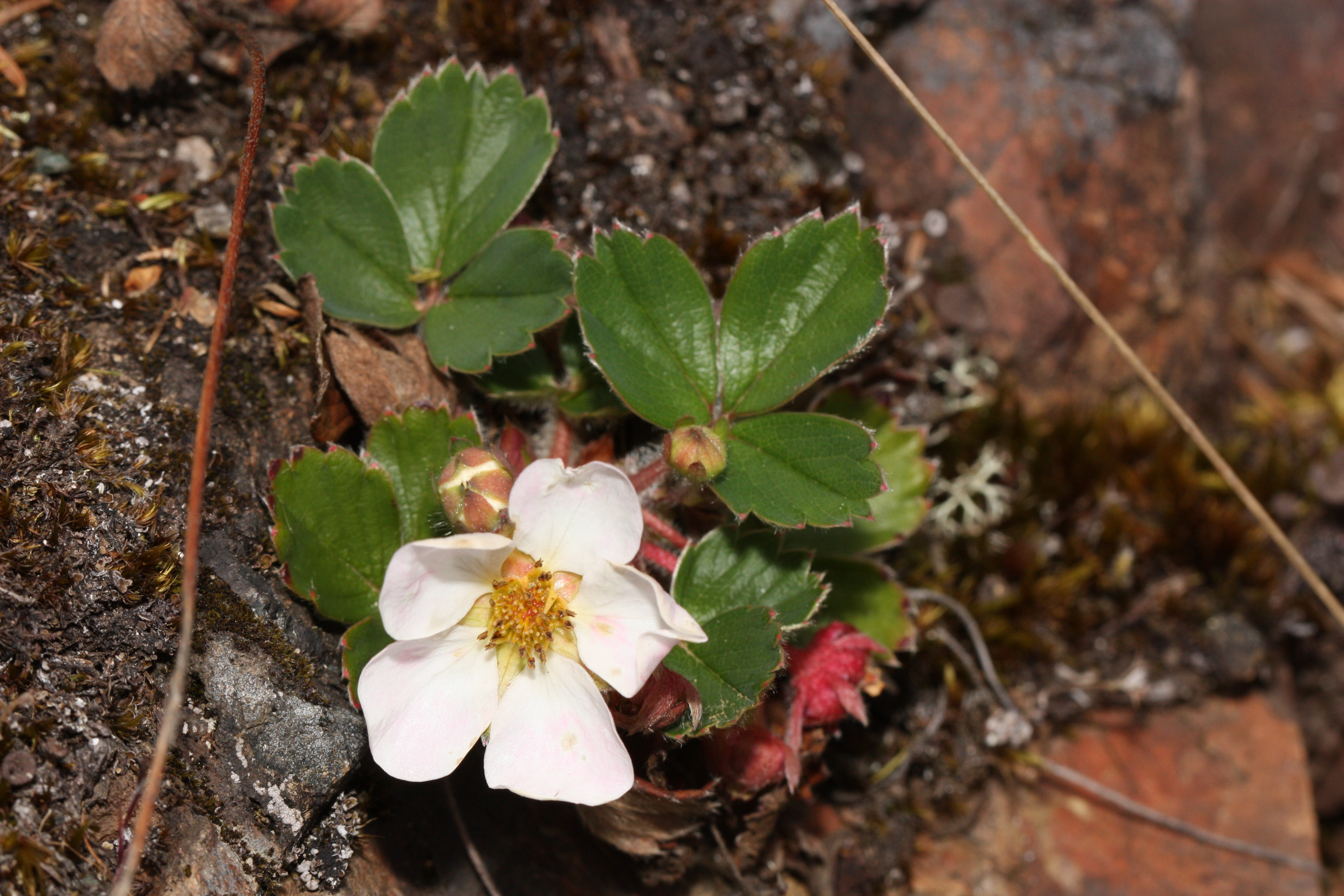
- In Deception Pass State Park, Washington (state)

Scientific classification
- Kingdom: Plantae
- Clade: Tracheophytes
- Clade: Angiosperms
- Clade: Eudicots
- Clade: Rosids
- Order: Rosales
- Family: Rosaceae
- Genus: Fragaria
- Species: F. virginiana

Binomial name
- Fragaria virginiana Mill.

Synonyms
- Fragaria ovalis (Lehm.) Rydb.

= Fragaria virginiana =

Species of strawberry

Fragaria virginiana, known as Virginia strawberry, wild strawberry, common strawberry, or mountain strawberry, is a perennial North American strawberry that grows across much of the United States and southern Canada. It is one of the two species of wild strawberry that were hybridized to create the modern domesticated garden strawberry (Fragaria × ananassa).

== Description ==
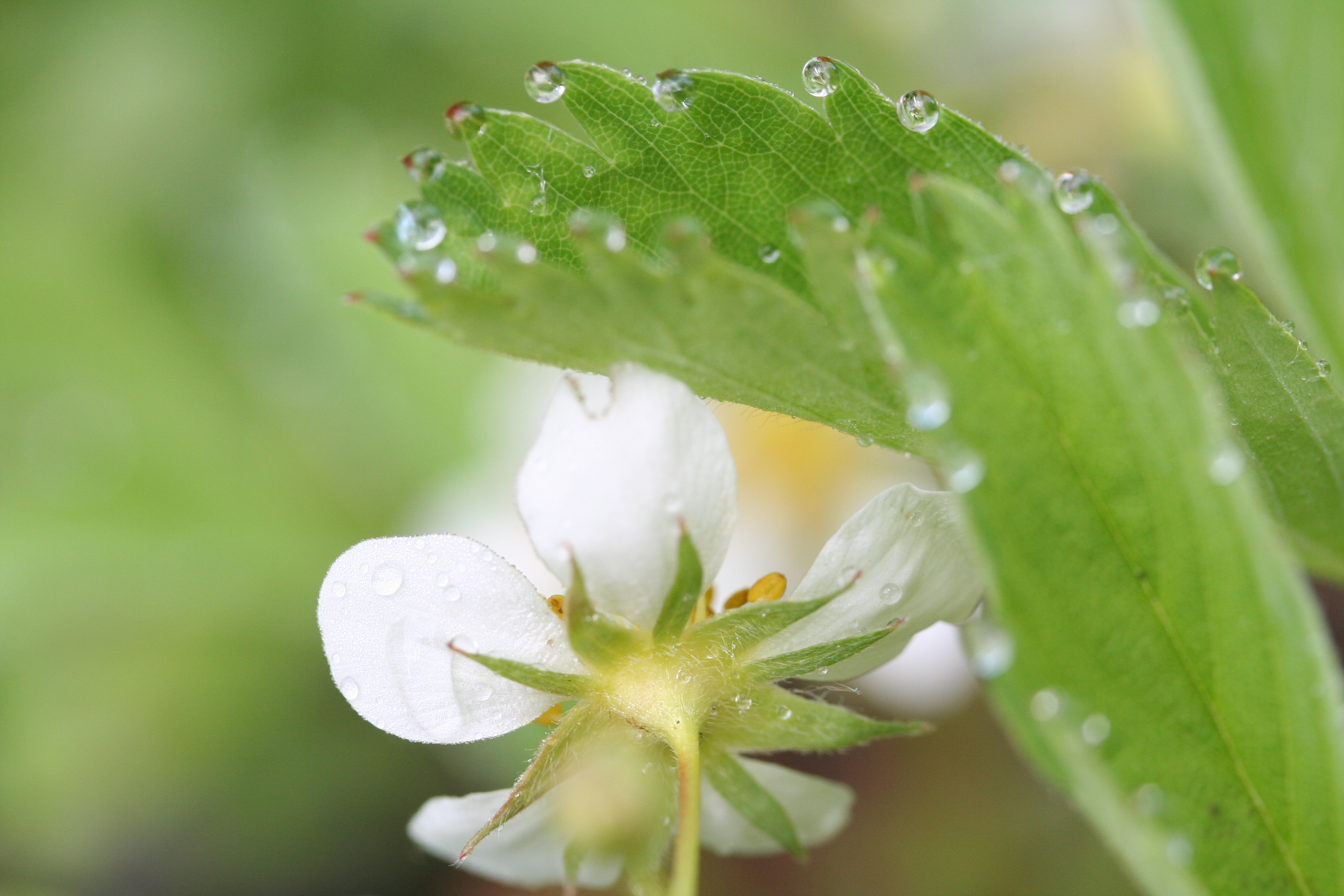
Fragaria virginiana, Saint-Prosper-de-Champlain, Quebec, Canada

Fragaria virginiana can grow up to 10 centimetres (4 inches) tall. The plant typically bears numerous trifoliate leaves that are green on top, pale green on the lower surface. Each leaflet is about 10 cm (4 in) long and 4 cm (1.6 in) wide. The leaflet is oval shaped and has coarse teeth along the edge except near the bottom. This plant has a five-petaled white flower with numerous pistils, surrounded by yellow-anthered stamens. There are ten small green sepals under the petals.

The seeds of this plant are developed from the pistils in the centre of the flower which will become dark-coloured fruit (achenes) on the strawberry. The fruit of the wild strawberry is smaller than that of the garden strawberry (Fragaria × ananassa). Botanically, the fruit is classified as an aggregate accessory fruit, but it is commonly called a berry. Strawberries reproduce both sexually by seed, and asexually by runners (stolons).

Fragaria virginiana thrives best in moderate to cooler temperature climates. Full sunlight or partial shade are ideal for the plant, and nutrient dense well-drained soils (ideally sandy loam).The wild strawberry is native to North America, and is found in all US states and provinces of Canada.

=== Cytology ===
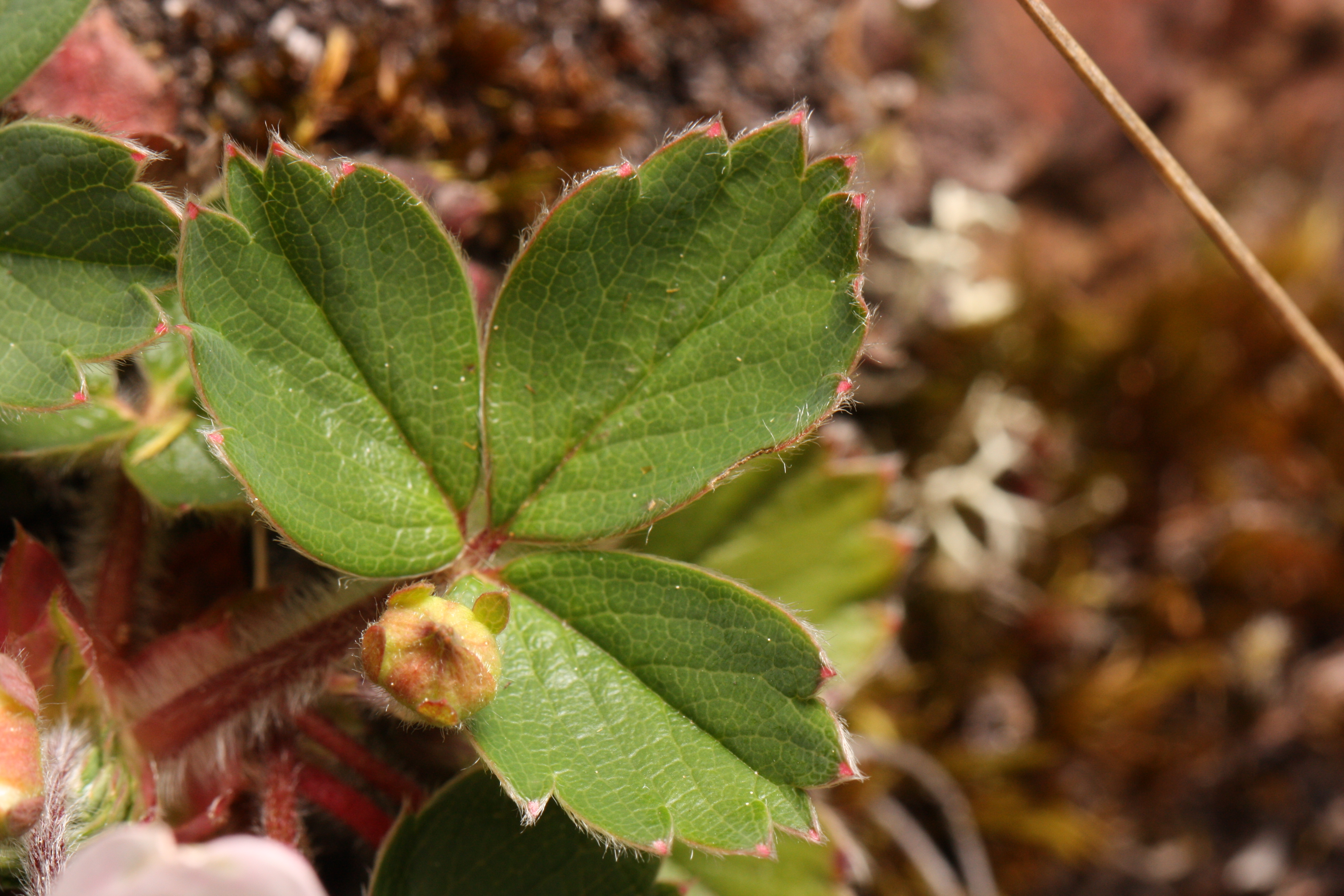
Fragaria virginiana var. platypetala usually has dense and spreading pubescence on flower and leaf stalks as illustrated by this individual.

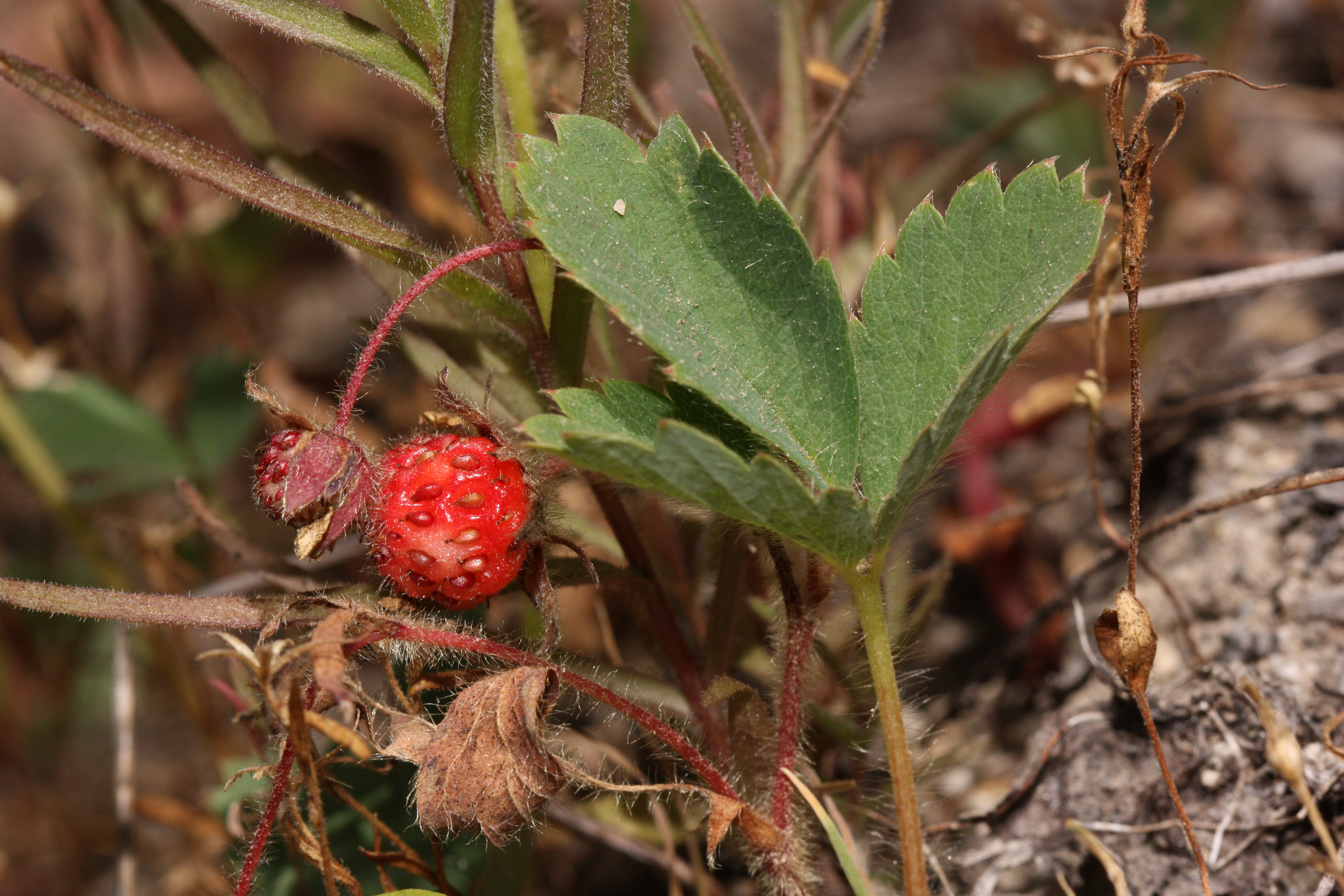
The fruit is a reddish, fleshy aggregate dotted with "seeds" (achenes) up to 1 cm.

All strawberries have a base haploid count of 7 chromosomes. Fragaria virginiana is octoploid, having eight sets of these chromosomes for a total of 56. These eight sets of chromosomes pair as four distinct couples, of two different types, with little or no pairing between sets. The genome composition of the octoploid strawberry species has generally been indicated as AAA'A'BBB'B'. The A-type sets were likely contributed by diploid ancestors related to Fragaria vesca or similar species, while the B-type genomes seem to descend from a close relative of Fragaria iinumae. The exact process of hybridization and speciation which resulted in the octoploid species is still unknown, but it appears that the genome structure of both Fragaria chiloensis and Fragaria virginiana (and by extension their hybrid, the cultivated octoploid garden strawberry as well) are identical.

== Reproduction ==
As stated prior, strawberries reproduce both sexually by seed, and asexually by runners (stolons). This is reflected in the composition of gynodioecious Fragaria virginiana populations. Having both hermaphroditic and female plants within a population creates room to have a variety of reproductive strategies.

The stolons in asexual reproduction result in a creeping spread of the Fragaria virginiana population. This results in the dispersion of the plant being relatively clumped and nearby the parental plant, taking root close to the established population.

When reproducing sexually, the strawberries require pollinators to take the pollen from one plants anthers to another plants stigma. These pollinators (often bees, flies and ants) have been found to have a preference for visiting the hermaphrodite flowers over the female flowers.

Once the plants have been fertilized and fruits have developed, Fragaria virginiana relies on herbivores for seed dispersal. Mammals such as bears, mice, elk, raccoons and more feed upon the fruits of the wild strawberry and provide long distance seed dispersal. Often, these herbivores will eat the fruit, travel to a different location, and defecate the remaining seed. This puts the seed in a new location and surrounds it in feces fertilizer.

There are both benefits and detriments that can be gained by Fragraia virginiana from having both sexual and asexual reproduction.

Aspect Analysis of Dispersion Methods
	Benefits	Detriments
Long Distance Dispersion (Sexual Reproduction)	Finding a new, more favorable environment.; Escaping local pathogen risk.; Increased Outcrossing.; Introduction of new and beneficial alleles.	Landing in an environment that is not suitable for survival.; Possible decrease in sexual reproduction success.; Introduction of maladaptive alleles.; Encountering new risks and pathogen.
Short Distance Dispersion (Asexual Reproduction)	Ensured environment suitable for survival.; Kin population advantage.; Species known for interacting with the plant are present.; Increased survival rate because travel is dangerous.	Competition with already present population.; Decrease in genetic diversity within the population.

== Taxonomy ==
The full scientific name of the wild strawberry has historically been debated. Fragaria virginiana Mill. is considered to be the valid name for this plant by a number of authorities (and was described by Philip Miller in 1768 in the eighth edition of The Gardeners Dictionary). According to the International Plant Names Index the name, Fragaria virginiana Duchesne, published by Antoine Nicolas Duchesne in 1766, is an invalid name. However, other authorities consider the valid name to be Fragaria virginiana Duchesne.

=== Subspecies ===
There are four recognized subspecies:

- Fragaria virginiana subsp. glauca (formerly known as F. ovalis)
- Fragaria virginiana subsp. grayana
- Fragaria virginiana subsp. platypetala
- Fragaria virginiana subsp. virginiana

== Disease and plant defense ==
Fragaria virginiana faces threats from multiple fungi and bacteria including gray mold, anthracnose, powdery mildew, leaf spot, rhizopus, and angular leaf spot.

In agricultural settings, these diseases are managed through a variety of methods such as genetic breeding to create resistant plant strains, chemical deterrence against the fungi/bacteria, and plant rotation to help keep plant populations and soil fresh and free of pathogen.

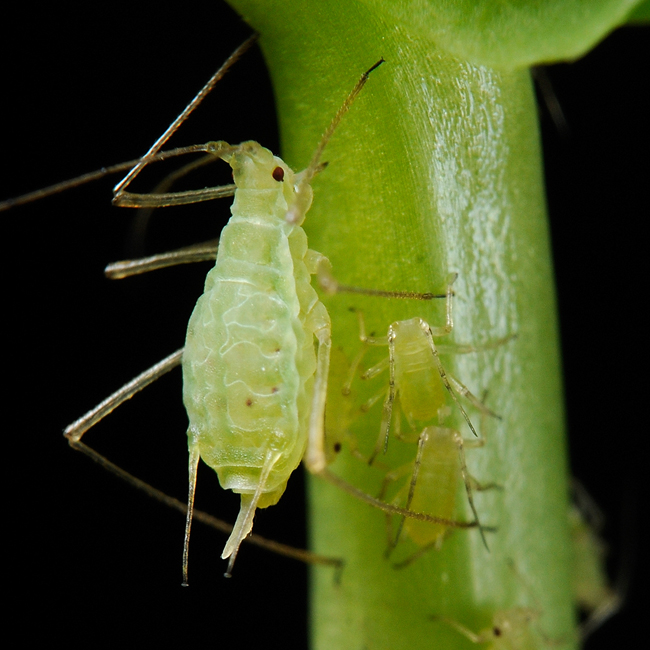
An example of an insect that feeds upon Fragaria viriginiana: aphids

Disease, however, is not the only threat facing Fragaria virginiana. Herbivory is another significant threat to the survival and reproduction of these plants. Unlike their industrial counterpart Fragaria × ananassa, Fragaria virginiana is more commonly found in the wild, resulting in the uncontrolled consumption of the plant leaves, structural components, and reproductive fruits by herbivores. The herbivores that feed upon this plant include mammals such as bears, mice, elk, raccoons and pests/insects that include but are not limited to aphids, thrips, froghoppers and leafhoppers. Fascinatingly, Fragaria virginiana attracts its pests’ natural predator: parasitoid wasps. This, without the employment of any physical mechanisms, indirectly but effectively protects the plant from its consumers.

== Uses ==
Fragaria virginiana has many uses: erosion control in weak soils, ground coverage, medicinal treatments, and culinary purposes.

== In culture ==
According to Haudenosaunee mythology, the first strawberries grew out of Earth Woman's heart after she died giving birth to her twin sons, Sapling and Flint.

According to Cherokee mythology, the first strawberries were created by The Sun to reunite the quarreling First Man and First Woman. The myth attempts to explain why the eastern edge of old Cherokee territory in the Appalachian region was known for its rich abundance of strawberries and other fruits. Because of the myth, strawberries are often kept in Cherokee households as a reminder to not argue and as a symbol of good luck.
