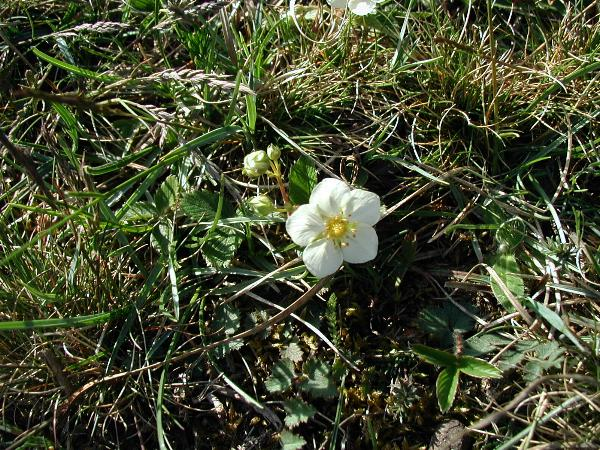

Scientific classification
- Kingdom: Plantae
- Clade: Embryophytes
- Clade: Tracheophytes
- Clade: Angiosperms
- Clade: Eudicots
- Clade: Rosids
- Order: Rosales
- Family: Rosaceae
- Genus: Fragaria
- Species: F. viridis

Binomial name
- Fragaria viridis Weston

Synonyms
- Fragaria breslingea var. viridis (Weston) Ser.; Fragaria vesca var. viridis (Weston) Fiori; Fragaria vesca subsp. viridis (Weston) Rivas Goday & Borja; Potentilla viridis (Weston) Prantl

= Fragaria viridis =

Species of strawberry

Fragaria viridis, commonly called creamy strawberry or green strawberry, is a species of strawberry native to Europe and central Asia. It has fruits with fine flavour. They have surprisingly little of the usual strawberry aroma, but a refreshing acidity, and sometimes ripen without becoming red. When they are plucked from the plant, the calyx will usually adhere and they will detach with a noticeable snapping sound.

All strawberries have a base haploid count of 7 chromosomes. Fragaria viridis is diploid, having 2 pairs of these chromosomes for a total of 14 chromosomes. Fragaria viridis is approximately 6.24 million years old.

== Gallery ==
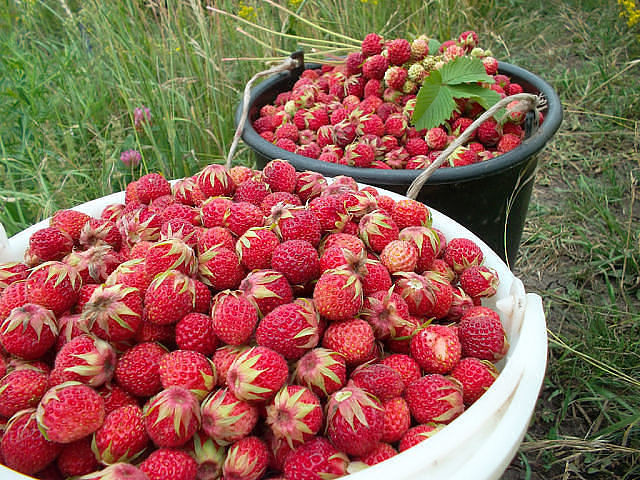
Bucket of fruit (In Russian these strawberries are called polunitsa (Russian: Полуница))

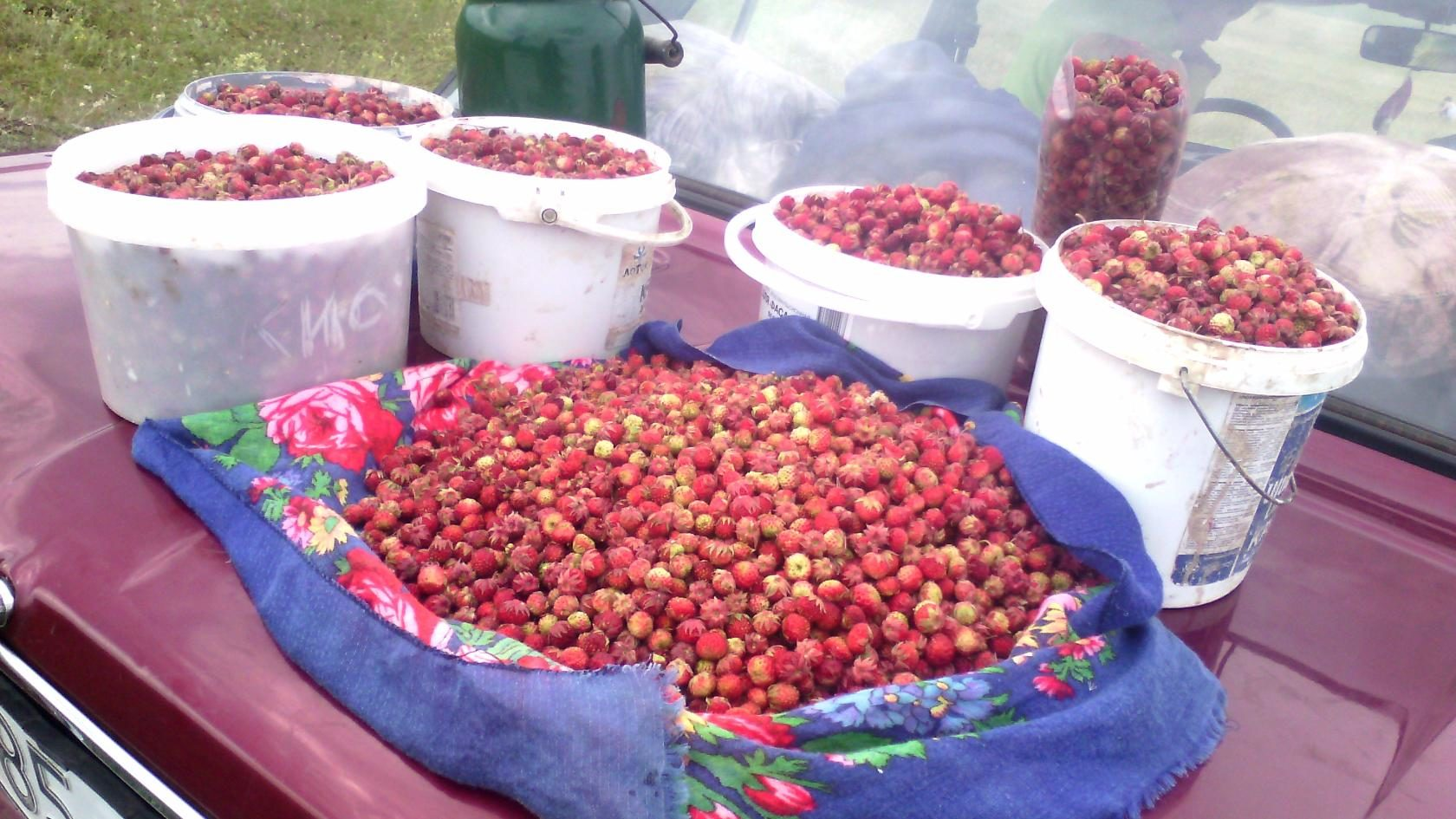

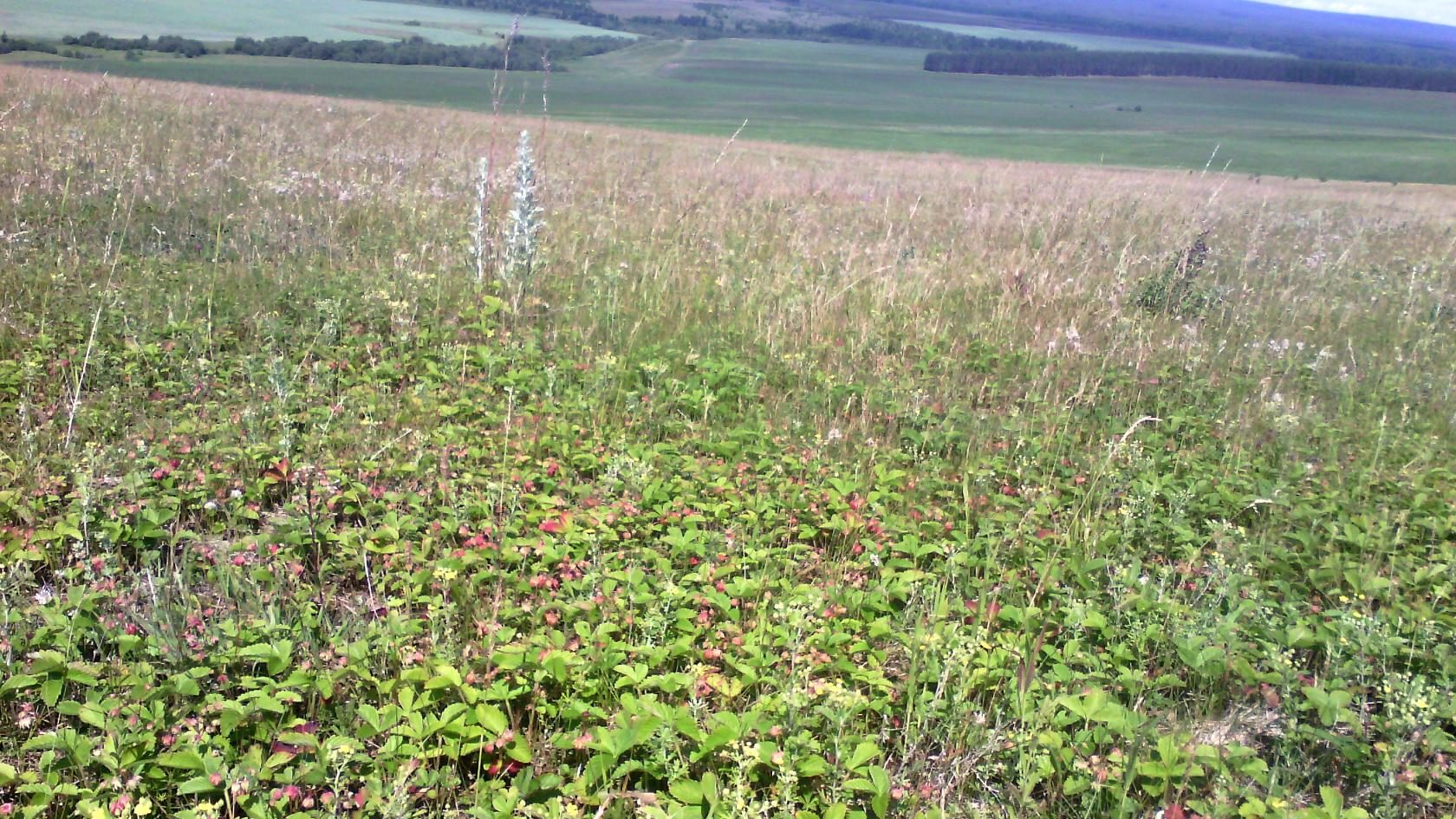
A field of wild Fragaria viridis plants

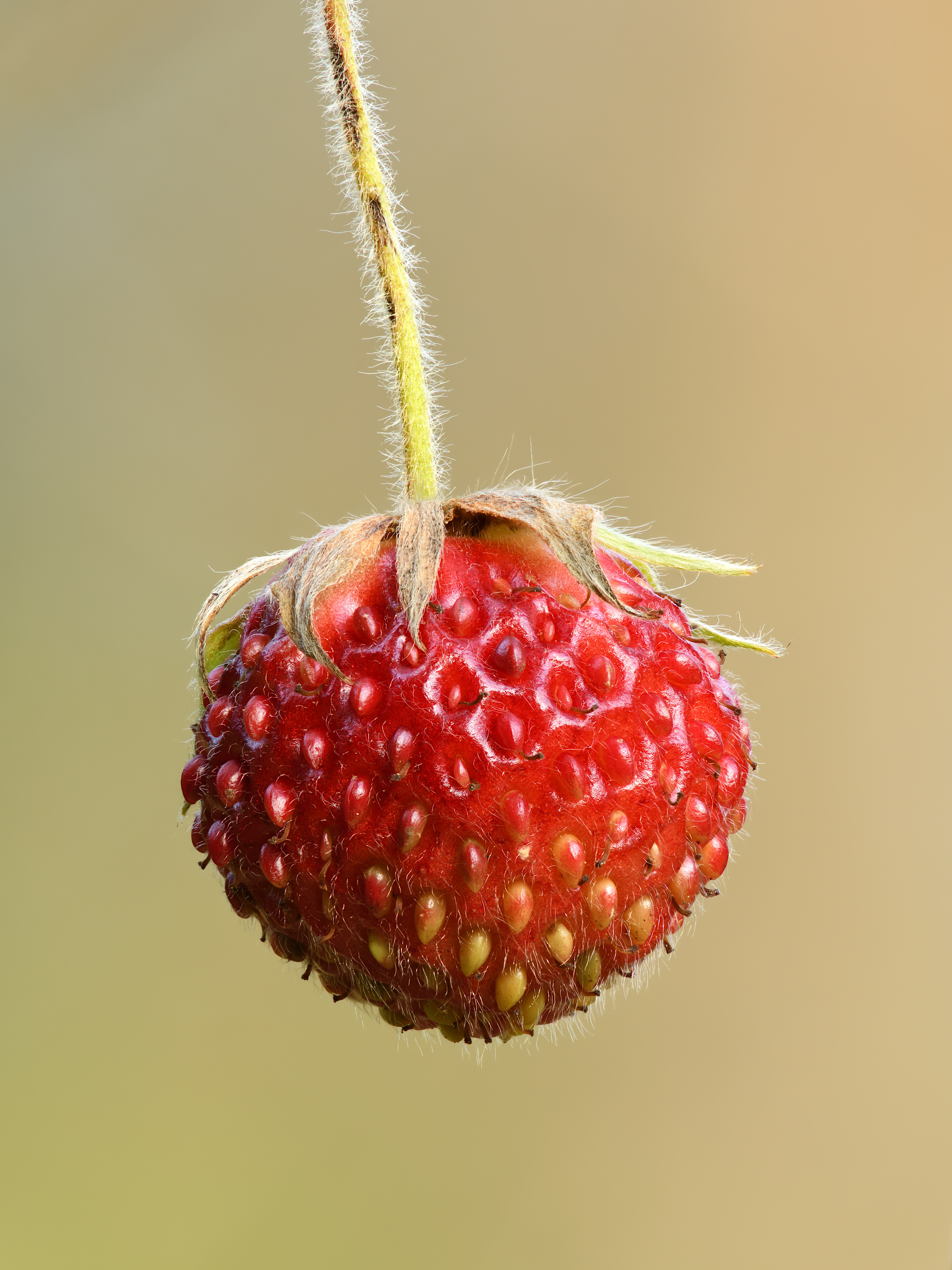
Fruit (In Estonian these strawberries are called muulukas)

== See also ==
- Wild strawberry
- Musk strawberry
- Strawberry
