= Antoine Nicolas Duchesne =

French botanist (1747–1827)

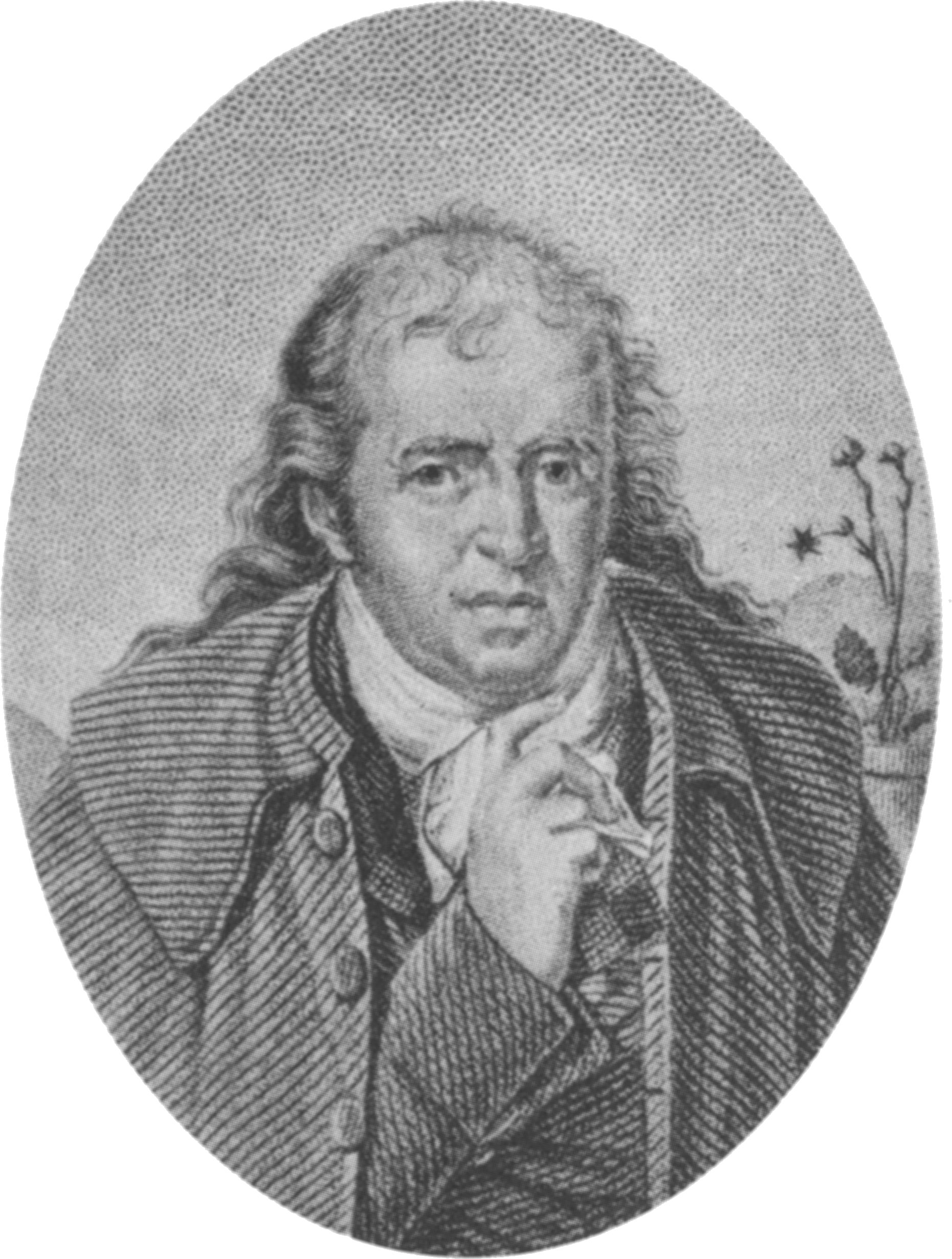
Antoine Nicolas Duchesne

Antoine Nicolas Duchesne (born 7 October 1747 Versailles; died 18 February 1827 Paris) was a French botanist known for his keen observation of variation within species, and for demonstrating that species are not immutable, because mutations can occur. "As Duchesne's observations were unaided by knowledge of modern concepts of genetics and molecular biology, his insight was truly remarkable." His particular interests were in strawberries and gourds.

His father Antoine Duchesne (1708–1797) was an architect and served as superintendent of the king's buildings at Versailles.

Duchesne junior worked in the gardens of Versailles, where he was a student of Bernard de Jussieu and corresponded with Carl Linnaeus. He established a notable collection of strawberries in the botanical garden of the Petit Trianon and was the first to document the separation of sexes in wild strawberry and the hybrid origin of the garden strawberry.

The genus Duchesnea Sm. (Rosaceae) was named after him.

== Works (selected) ==
- Manuel de botanique, contenant les propriétés des plantes utiles, 1764
- Essai sur l’histoire naturelle des courges, 46 pp. Panckoucke, Paris 1786.
- Histoire naturelle des fraisiers contenant les vues d'économie réunies à la botanique et suivie de remarques particulières sur plusieurs points qui ont rapport à l'histoire naturelle générale, Didot jeune, Paris 1766. on line at Bayerische Staatsbibliothek and GoogleBooks
- Le Jardinier prévoyant, contenant par forme de tableau, le rapport des opérations journalières avec le temps des récoltes successives qu'elles préparent. 11 vols. P. F. Didot jeune, Paris 1770-1781
- Sur la formation des jardins, Dorez, Paris 1775.
- Le Porte-feuille des enfans, mélange intéressant d'animaux, fruits, fleurs, habillemens, plans, cartes et autres objets.... Mérigot jeune, Paris, [n.d., probably 1784].
- Le Livret du ″Porte-feuille des enfans″, à l'usage des écoles... d'après la loi du 11 germinal an IV. Imprimerie de Gueffier, Paris, an VI – 1797.
- Le Cicerone de Versailles, ou l'Indicateur des curiosités et des établissemens de cette ville.... J.-P. Jacob, Versailles, an XII — 1804; revised and augmented in 1815.

== Sources ==
- Adrien Davy de Virville (ed.) (1955) Histoire de la botanique en France. Paris: SEDES 394 p.
