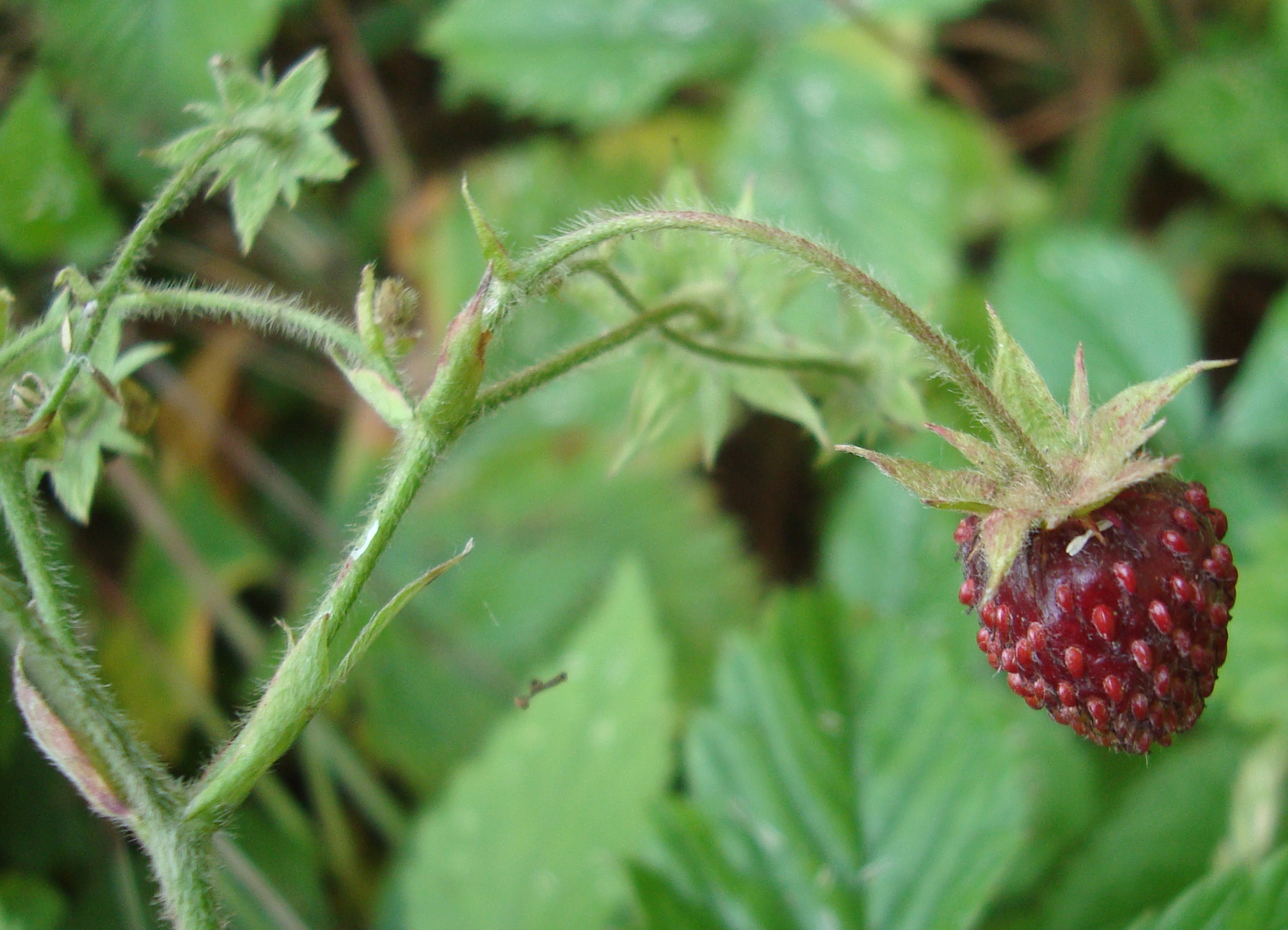

Scientific classification
- Kingdom: Plantae
- Clade: Tracheophytes
- Clade: Angiosperms
- Clade: Eudicots
- Clade: Rosids
- Order: Rosales
- Family: Rosaceae
- Genus: Fragaria
- Species: F. moschata

Binomial name
- Fragaria moschata Duchesne

Synonyms
- Fragaria muricata D.H.Kent

= Musk strawberry =

Species of fruit and plant

The musk strawberry or hautbois strawberry (Fragaria moschata), is a species of strawberry native to Europe. Its French name hautbois strawberry may be anglicised as hautboy strawberry. The plants are hardy and can survive in many weather conditions. They are cultivated commercially on a small scale, particularly in Italy. The fruit are small and round; they are used in the gourmet community for their intense aroma and flavour, which has been compared to a mixture of regular strawberry, raspberry and pineapple. Popular cultivated varieties include 'Capron' and 'Profumata di Tortona'.

== Distribution ==
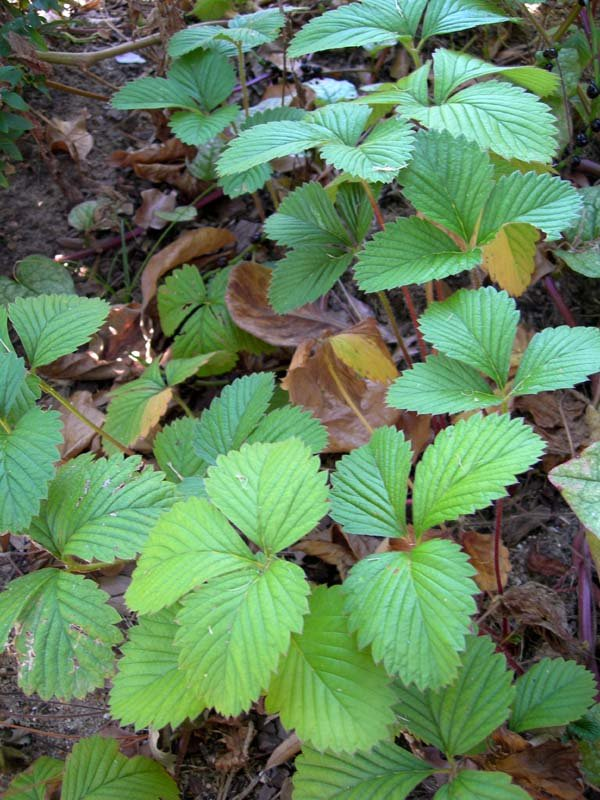

Musk strawberries grow wild to a limited extent in the forests of Central Europe, north into Scandinavia, and east into Russia. The musk strawberry is found growing along the edges of forests and requires moist and sheltered sites since they do not tolerate temperature fluctuations.

== Polyploidy ==
All strawberries have a base haploid count of 7 chromosomes. Fragaria moschata is usually hexaploid, having three pairs of these chromosomes for a total of 42 chromosomes, but due to its history of several chromosomal duplication events may be a diploid of 2n = 28, 35, 42, or 56.

== Cultivation ==
Musk strawberry has long been in cultivation in parts of Europe. This species was the first strawberry of any sort with a cultivar name, which was Le Chapiron (1576). By 1591, the cultivar was called Chapiton, then later Capiton. In the early 17th century an illustration appeared in the Hortus Eystettensis as fraga fructu magno. It was mentioned by Quintinye, gardener to Louis XIV, as Capron in 1672. At the beginning of the 19th century musk strawberries were the most common garden strawberry in Germany.

Cultivation of musk strawberries is similar to that of garden strawberry (Fragaria × ananassa) or alpine strawberry (Fragaria vesca); the plants thrive in nutrient-rich soils. However, neither female plants nor hermaphroditic plants are self-fertile; they require pollen transfer from a male or a clone of a different hermaphroditic cultivar of the same species, which is usually achieved by insect pollinators.

Cultivars:

- 'Capron royal', hermaphrodite
- 'Askungen' (Truedsson) hermaphrodite
- 'Marie Charlotte' (Hans) hermaphrodite
- 'Bauwens', female
- 'Capron', female
- 'Profumata di Tortona', female
- 'Siegerland', female
- 'Cotta', male
