= Strawberry crinkle virus =

Virus classification
- (unranked): Virus
- Realm: Riboviria
- Kingdom: Orthornavirae
- Phylum: Negarnaviricota
- Class: Monjiviricetes
- Order: Mononegavirales
- Family: Rhabdoviridae
- Genus: Alphacytorhabdovirus
- Species: Alphacytorhabdovirus fragariarugosus

Synonyms
- Strawberry crinkle cytorhabdovirus

Species of virus

Strawberry crinkle virus (SCV) is a negative sense single stranded RNA virus that threatens strawberry production worldwide. This virus reduces plant rigidity, runner production, fruit size, and production, while causing distortion and crinkling of the leaves. This virus was first described in 1932 in Oregon and California with commercial strawberry varieties, and later became an issue around the world, including North America, South America, Europe, South Africa, New Zealand, Australia, and Japan. Of the family Rhabdoviridae, it is a large family of viruses that affects plants, vertebrates, and invertebrates. Specifically, this virus infects strawberry plants of the genus Fragaria and is transmitted through two aphid vectors that feed on strawberries, Chaetosiphon fragaefolii and C. jacobi. When SCV is combined with other aphid-transmitted strawberry viruses, such as mottle, mild yellow-edge, vein banding, or pallidosis, the damage becomes even more deleterious. Economically, the only significant host of SCV is Fragaria ananassa.

== Baltimore Classification ==
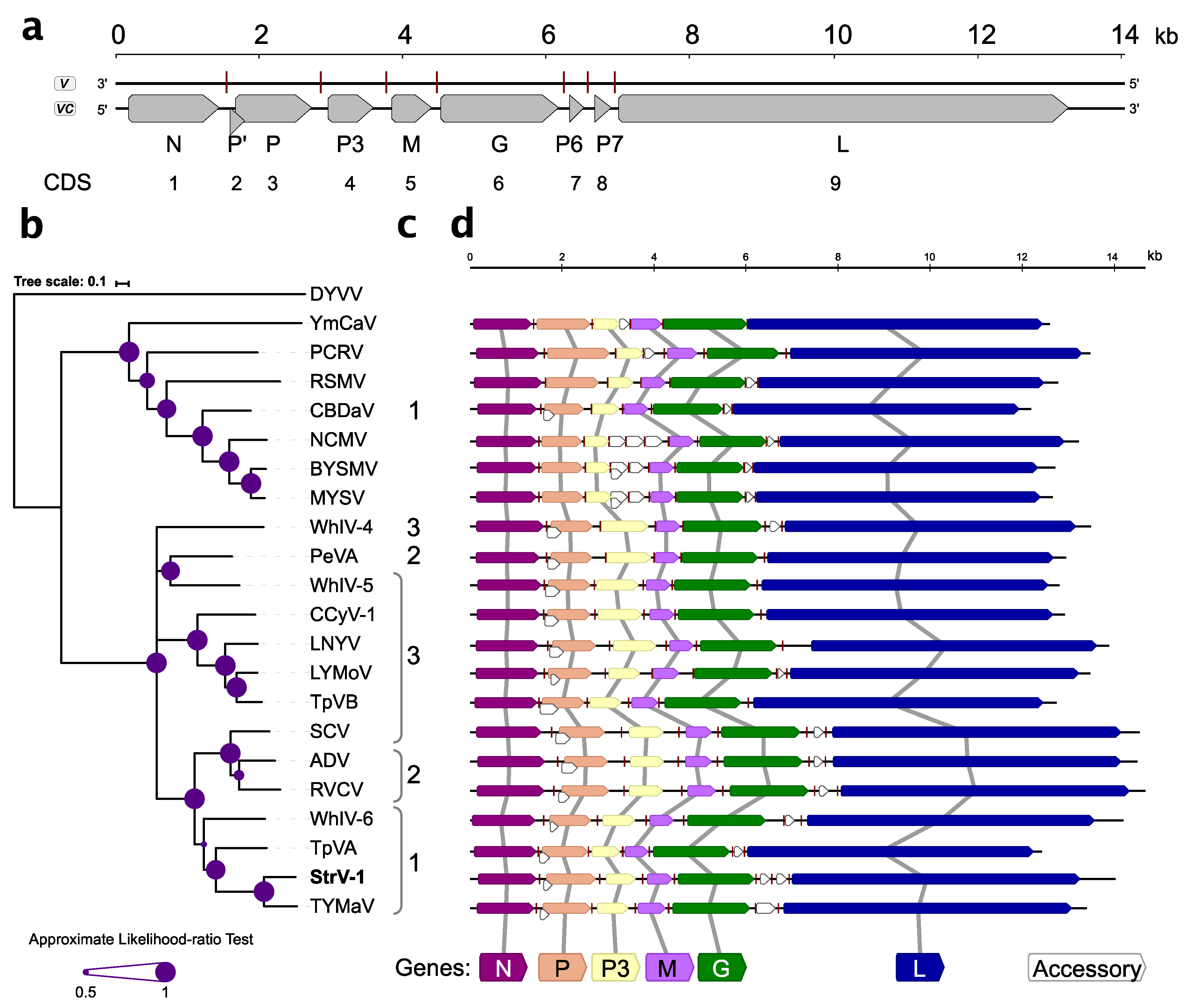
SCV in its family tree

Based on the Baltimore classification, which is a virus classification system the groups viruses into families based on their genome type, we can know the steps the virus must take in order to produce mRNA and how the genome is copied to create more genomes. All viruses want to get to mRNA in order to go through the process of translation; however, only positive sense single stranded RNA virus (+RNA) have the capability to do this. (-)RNA viruses, such as SCV, are not able to be translated by the host because cells do not have the machinery to copy it, indicating that the virus needs to bring their own enzyme, RNA-dependent RNA polymerase, in order to copy the negative strand into mRNA. This allows viruses, such as SCV, to produce (+)RNA, which can therefore be translated by the host.

== Structure and genome ==
SCV is enveloped with a bacilliform morphology. The virus is roughly 163-383 nm long and 74-88 nm in diameter. Glycoproteins are likely said to be the primary surface projections that occur in the cytoplasm, which are either coated or uncoated. Its nucleocapsids is enclosed in a host-derived envelope and are typically helical with a linear genome that is a negative sense single stranded RNA (- RNA). Typically, SCV's viral genome is roughly 13kb and contains four proteins. The four proteins involved in this virus are glycoprotein (G), nucleocapsid (N), phosphoprotein (P), and the matrix (M) with their respective sizes of 77 kDa, 55 kDa, 45 kDa, and 23 kDa. Like other plant rhabdoviruses there is a fifth protein involved, a large protein (L) that is 230 kDa.

The organization of these five proteins in SCV's genome is highly conserved. The genome's order is as follows: N, P, M, G, L, while regions in between these proteins exist. The accumulation of M and G proteins are responsible for the bacilliform shaped morphology of SCV.

== Replication cycle ==
=== Gene expression ===
RNA dependent RNA polymerase binds to the SCV genome at the 3’ end where the genes are then transcribed. Once synthesis reaches the L protein near the 5’ end, mRNAs are capped and polyadenylated.

=== Entry into cell ===
Virus entry into the host cell occurs when viral G glycoproteins attach to host cell surface receptors, initiating endocytosis. Endocytosis is initiated via low pH levels and coated pits that are made up of clathrin. The virus is then able to fuse with the hosts membrane, which occurs in the cytoplasm.

=== Replication ===
Once the virus fuses to the hosts membrane, replication occurs. The five proteins in SCV are transcribed from their (-)RNA by RNA polymerase, which is also the L protein. Other than this function, the L protein is also enzymatically essential for capping mRNAs and phosphorylating the P protein. The promoter site is located at the 3’-end of the genome where polymerase attaches and it moves along the RNA template towards the 5’-end. This movement from the leader to the trailer end of the mRNA produces the respective N, P, M, G, and L proteins.

Genome replication requires newly synthesized N proteins to encase the RNA. This is used to produce more negative sensed genomic RNA.

=== Transcription ===
Transcription occurs after entry into the cell and is regulated after both the L and P proteins are expressed in replication. This process occurs and accumulates in viroplasms, which are thread like structures that are located in the cytoplasm of infected cells. RNA dependent RNA polymerase or commonly known as Transcriptase, moves from the 3’ end of the genome to the 5’ end and can terminate randomly at any protein sequence, allowing for mRNA to be formed separately from each other. N proteins are usually produced in abundance and accumulate since they are located at the beginning of the genome (3’ end), which is located right after the leader RNA sequence. This is important because the N protein is needed for the virus because it is used to coat the outside of the replicated genomes.

During this process, there are start and stop signals which only allows a portion of the polymerase molecule to move past each junction in order for transcription to continue. This interruption results in greater amounts of mRNA that are produced towards the beginning of the genome, resulting in various amounts of mRNA produced as polymerase moves downstream from N, P, M, G, to L. This inconsistency results in greater amounts of nucleocapsid proteins being made than large (L) proteins.

After transcription occurs, all of the produced mRNAs are capped at the 5’ end and polyadenylated at the 3’ end. This process produces mRNAs for SCV in order for the translation to occur.

=== Translation ===
After the mRNAs are formed and are capped and polyadenylated to their respective ends, this structure mimics cellular mRNAs and allows for translation by cellular ribosomes to produce proteins.

The Rough Endoplasmic Reticulum is used to translate the G protein, indicating that G proteins have a simple peptide on their mRNA's start code. Phosphoproteins (P) and glycoproteins (G) then go through post-translational modification. After phosphorylation of the Large (L) protein occurs, trimers of the P protein are made. Then the G protein is glycosylated in the Rough Endoplasmic Reticulum and the Golgi complex.

=== Assembly and release ===
The virus exits the host cell through the process of budding and tubule-guided viral movement. Plants are the natural host for SCV and this virus is specifically transmitted by aphid vectors. Principally, Chaetosiphon fragaefolii.

The transmission cycle depends on temperature. Lower temperatures increase the incubation period in the strawberry and the latent period in the vector.

== Modulation of Host Processes/Interaction with host ==
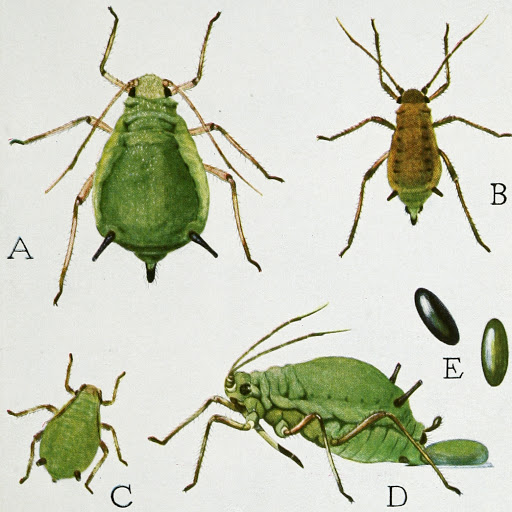
Aphid Vectors during their growth and development stages.

Strawberry aphid vectors, such as Chaetosiphon fragaefolii, is of genus Chaetosiphon, which are the primary causes of problems seen in strawberry plants worldwide. These vectors infiltrate strawberry plants, and appear to be either translucent yellow-white to pale green-yellow in color. The body length of C. fragaefolii is roughly 0.9–1.8 millimetres (5/128–9/128 in) long, while the antennae are 0.9-1.1 times the body length. Damage to plants are caused by aphid vectors sucking on the sap from plants, causing the observed symptoms of SCV. These vectors can be infected with this virus in as little as 24 hours from birth, while a latent period of 10–19 days are observed. Once infected, this vector can transmit SCV for up to 2 weeks.

== Associated Diseases ==
- Strawberry latent virus, strains A and B
- Strawberry lesion-A and lesion-B viruses
- Strawberry vein chlorosis virus

== Signs and symptoms ==
The symptoms of Strawberry crinkle virus varies between different varieties of plants, and they can also vary in the severity. Common symptoms can include spotting of the plant veins. The spotting can be chlorotic (yellowish spot on the leaf surface) or necrotic with areas of black indicating tissue death in these areas. The petals of the flowers can also be deformed, and thee petals can also have abnormal streaking. The virus can also cause malformed leaflets, crinkled leaves, and also uneven leaf distribution in the plant. Another symptom can be the formation of lesions or areas of damage in the petioles and stolons of the plant. Episnasty can also occur from the virus, which causes increased growth of the upper region of the plant, which in turn makes the plant top-heavy causing it to bend downward.

== Geographical Distribution ==
- SCV is seen worldwide and geographical regions affected include, but are not limited to:
  - Europe: Belgium, Bulgaria, Czech Republic, France, Germany, Italy, Netherlands, Poland, UK, Yugoslavia
  - Asia: China (Hebei, Hubei, Heilongjiang, Jilin, Jiangxi, Liaoning, Shandong, Shanxi, Zhejiang), Israel, Japan, Kazakhstan
  - Africa: South Africa
  - North America: Canada, USA (California, Oregon)
  - South America: Chile
  - Oceania: Australia (New South Wales, Tasmania, Victoria), New Zealand

== Tropism ==
The natural host range of SCV is narrow, including the wild strawberries F. vesca, F. virginiana and F. chiloensis, as well as on the cultivated species, F. ananassa.

In a study, the virus was isolated from strawberry leaf material; however, more experiments are necessary to conclude which strawberry plant tissues are optimal for the virus.

== Economic Impact and Solutions ==
Strawberries are one of the most important berry crops that are grown in the temperate regions. Due to this, the strawberry industry is a multibillion-dollar industry across the temperate regions of the world. Viruses are considered a minor factor of pathogens that cause major arm to crop productions. In order to control SCR, it is advised to control the vectors of this virus, aphids Chaetosiphon fragaefolii and C. jacobi. However, insecticides are not used to regulate aphid vectors due to possible harmful interactions with bumblebees, which are essential for pollinating the plants. Additionally cultivating healthy, virus-free plants can help control the spread of SCR. Plant material that has been infected by the virus should be eradicated. When trading strawberry plants, it is important to verify that the plant material has met the conditions of a virus-free certification scheme; however, apical meristems from diseased plants can be obtained and made virus-free by growing them on culture medium. This is most successful when the parent plants had been treated with heat of 35 °C-41 °C for several months.
