= Xanthosis =

Xanthosis is a yellowish discoloration of degenerating tissues, especially seen in malignant neoplasms. It can be differentiated clinically from jaundice as the sclerae are colored yellow in jaundice, but are not discolored in xanthosis.

== Other uses ==
=== Fruit farming ===
Xanthosis, or yellows, is a mid 20th century term for strawberry mild yellow-edge virus, a disease in strawberries, cause by the strawberry aphid. The disease is prevalent throughout the Americas.

=== Meat industry ===
Xanthosis is a brown pigmentation of skeletal and heart muscles of cattle. The condition is particularly seen in older animals, and in some wasting diseases. Prevalent in Ayrshire cattle and their crosses.

=== Trivia ===
It was the championship word used in the 1995 Scripps National Spelling Bee, and was also featured in the film Akeelah and the Bee.
