= Pineberry =

Strawberry cultivar

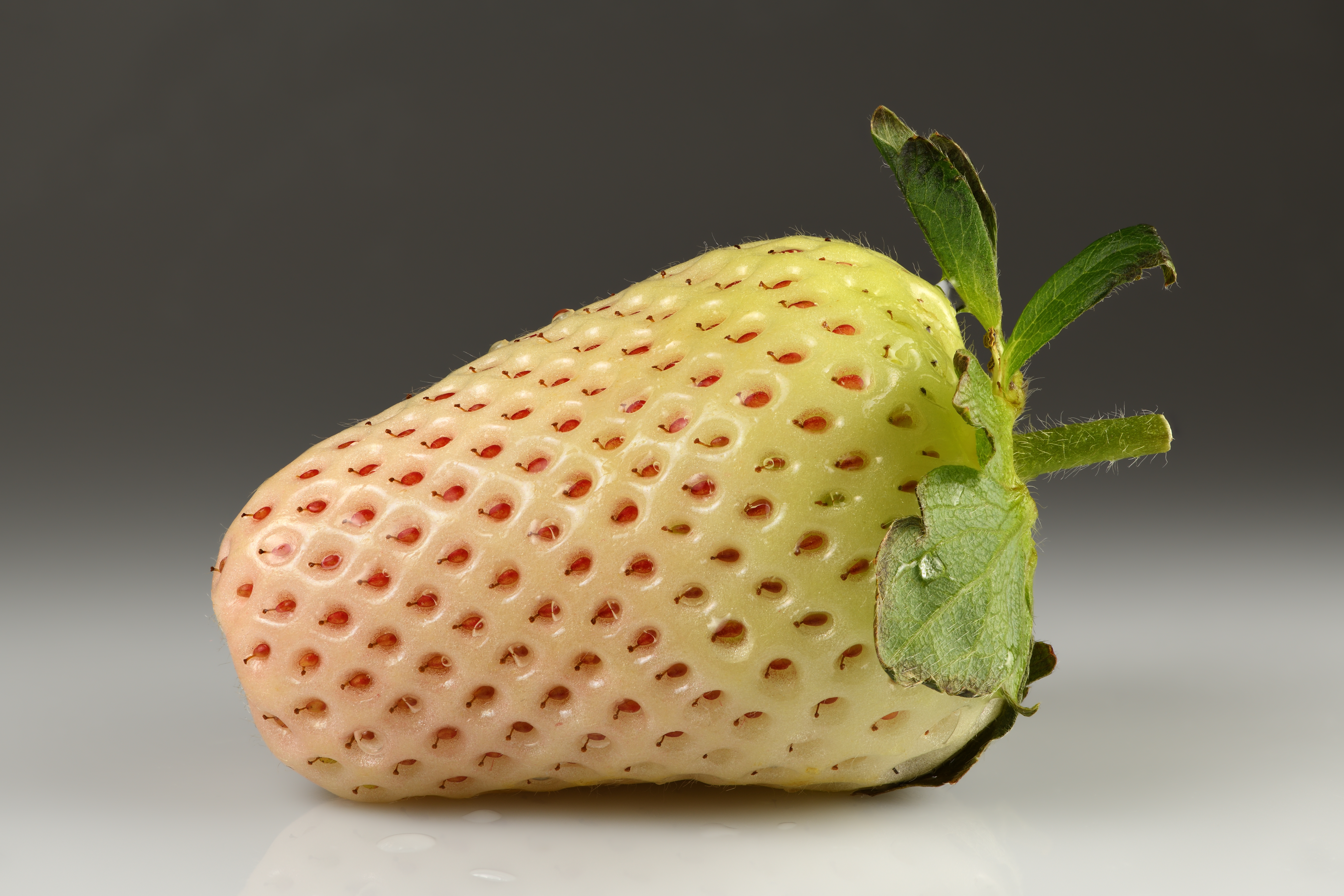
- 'Florida Pearl'
- Genus: Fragaria
- Species: virginiana × chiloensis
- Cultivar: Pineberry

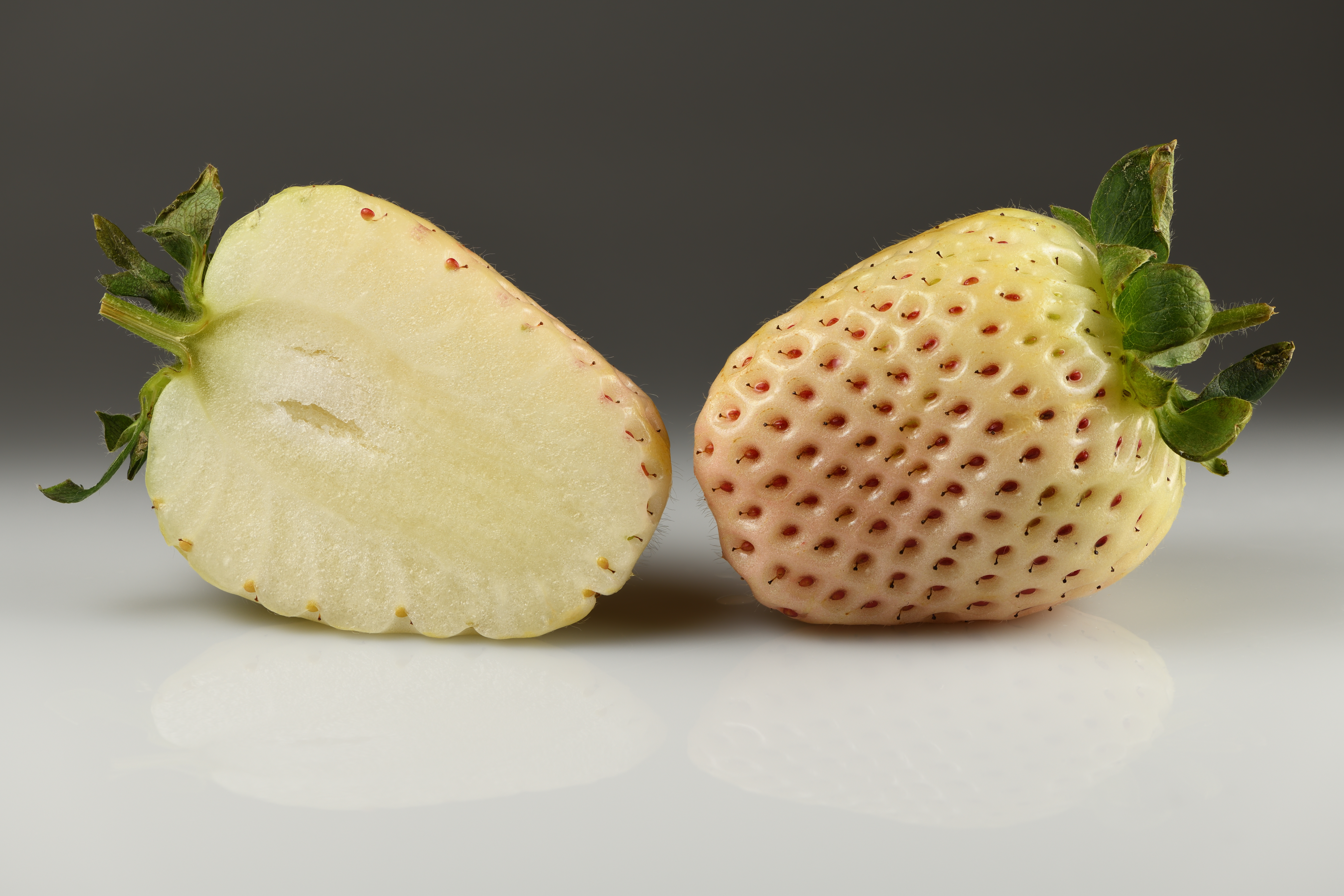
Halved and whole

Pineberry is a white strawberry cultivar with red seeds and a pineapple-like flavor.

== Description ==
Pineberry is a hybrid cross from Fragaria chiloensis and Fragaria virginiana. A pineberry is smaller than a common strawberry, measuring between 15 and 23 mm (5/8 and 7/8 in). When ripe, it is almost completely white, but with red achenes (the seeds). The plant is disease-resistant, and highly priced, although not profitable due to small-scale farming, small berry size and low yield. Pineberries are harvested in the spring and summer. First identified in South America around 2002, pineberries are cultivated in Belgium and exported from the Netherlands.

== Marketing ==
The fruit was dubbed "pineberry" for the UK market where it became available in 2010 to reflect its pineapple-like flavor, while still being a strawberry. Pineberries were first sold commercially in the United States in 2012, and were marketed to restaurants, bakeries and wholesale markets in Europe and Dubai.

== See also ==
- Fragaria nilgerrensis, a wild species of no commercial value that has white fruit
