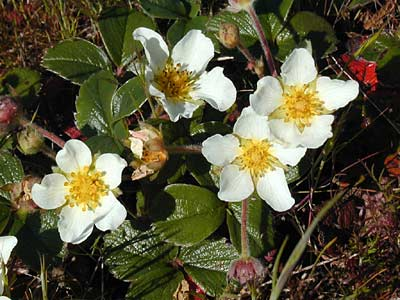

Scientific classification
- Kingdom: Plantae
- Clade: Tracheophytes
- Clade: Angiosperms
- Clade: Eudicots
- Clade: Rosids
- Order: Rosales
- Family: Rosaceae
- Genus: Fragaria
- Species: F. chiloensis

Binomial name
- Fragaria chiloensis (L.) Mill.

= Fragaria chiloensis =

Species of plant

Fragaria chiloensis, the beach strawberry, Chilean strawberry, or coastal strawberry, is one of two species of wild strawberry that were hybridized to create the modern garden strawberry (F. × ananassa). It is native to the Pacific Ocean coasts of North and South America.

== Description ==
It is an evergreen plant growing to 15–30 centimetres (6–12 inches) tall. The relatively thick leaves are glossy green and trifoliate, each leaflet around 5 cm (2 in) long. The stems are covered with long hairs and the leaves sometimes have a dense fringe of hairs. The flowers are white, produced in spring and early summer. The fruit, a strawberry, is edible, red on the surface and white inside.

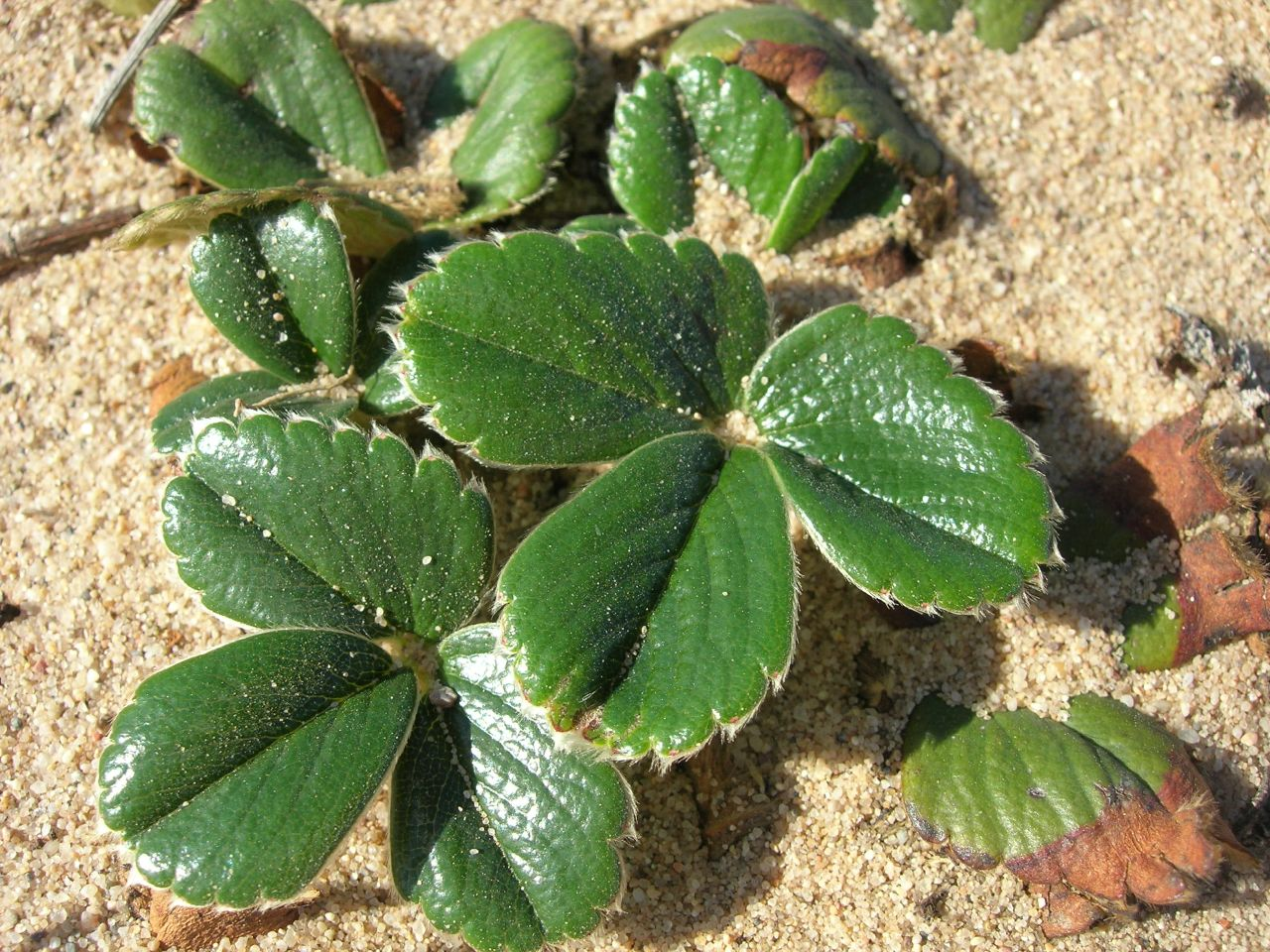
Leaves

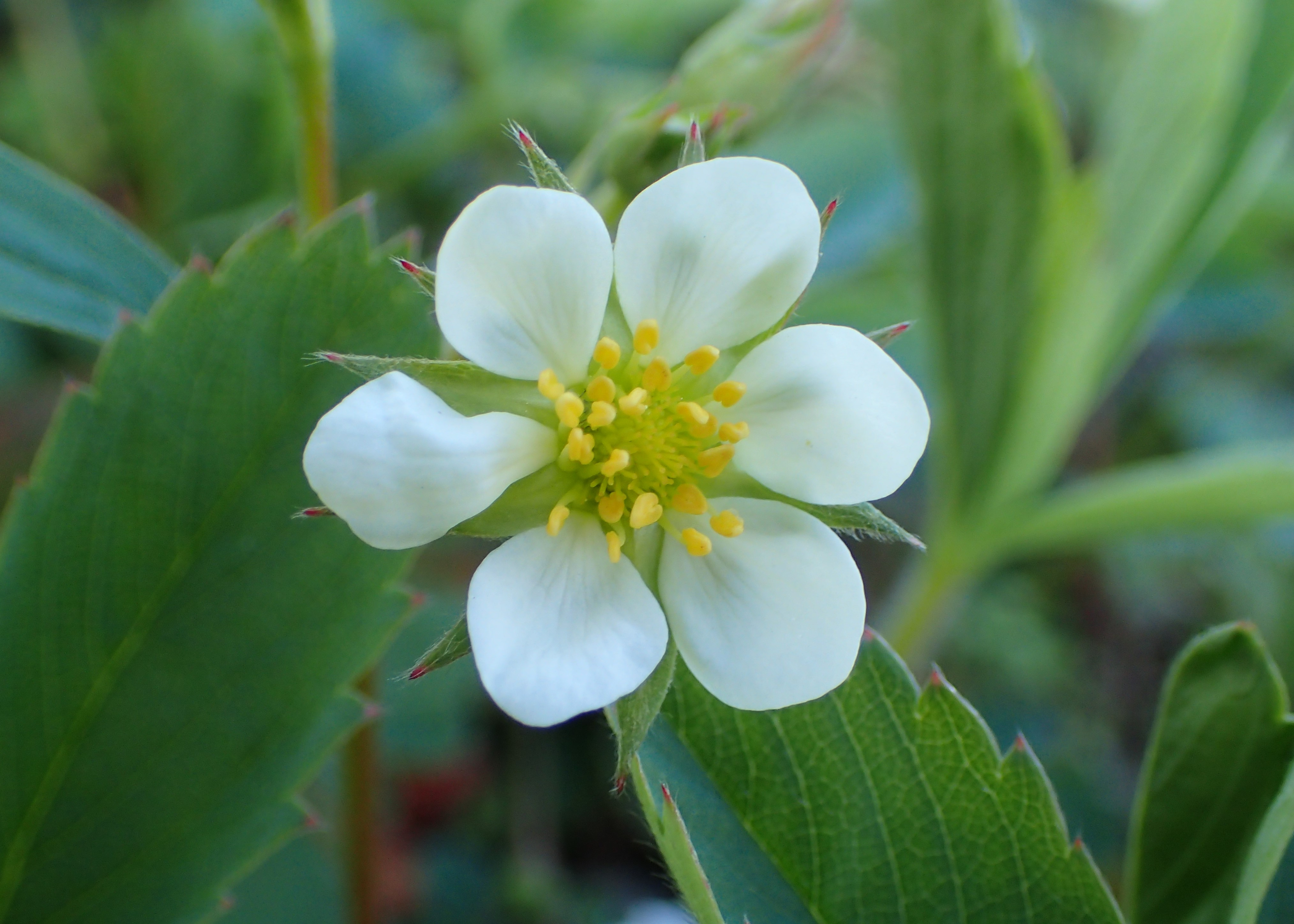
Young flower

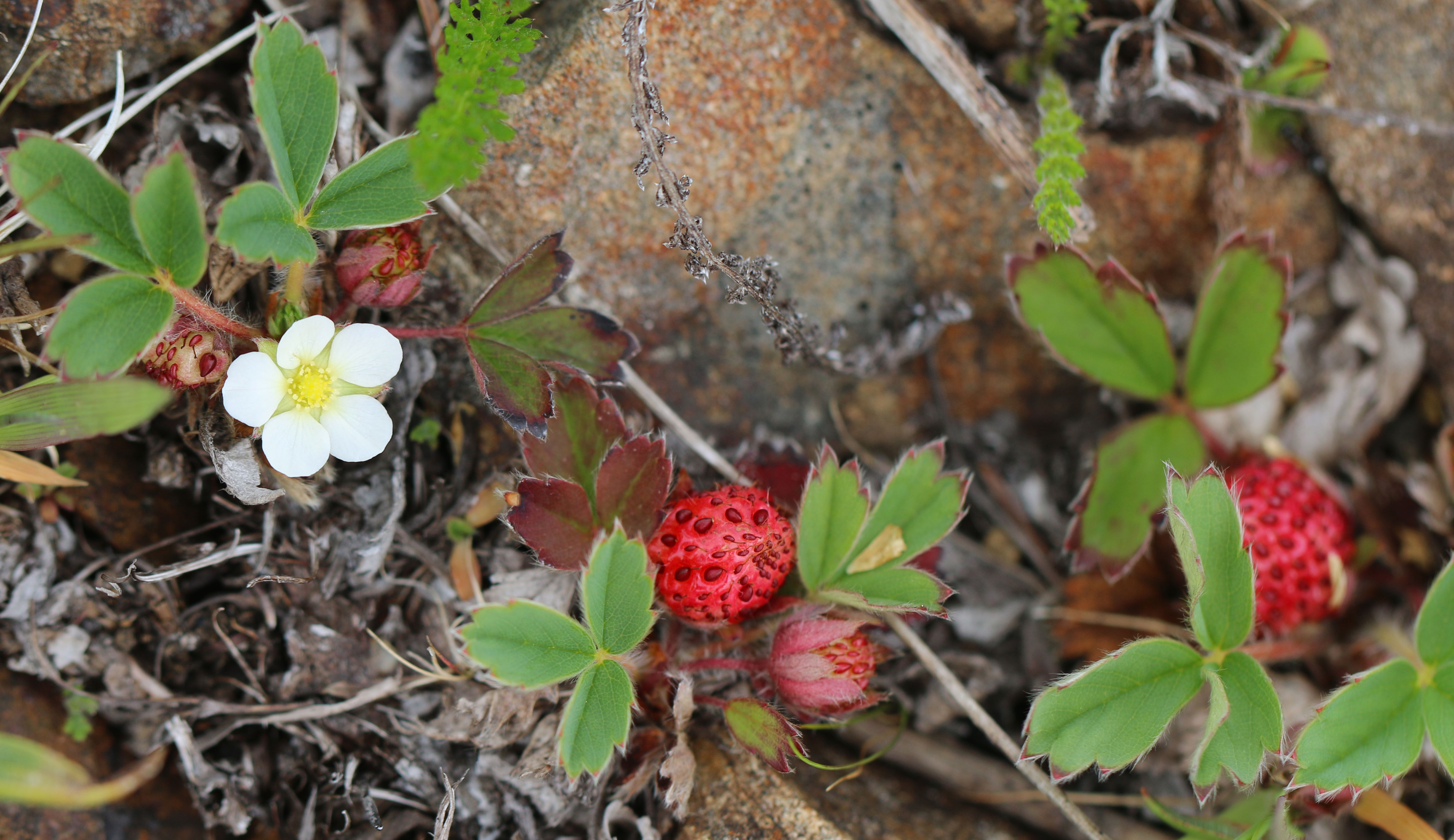
Berries emerging

=== Genetics ===
All strawberries have a base haploid count of 7 chromosomes. F. chiloensis is octoploid, having eight sets of these chromosomes for a total of 56. These eight genomes pair as four distinct sets, of two different types, with little or no pairing between sets. The genome composition of the octoploid strawberry species has generally been indicated as AAA'A'BBB'B'. The A-type genomes were likely contributed by diploid ancestors related to F. vesca or similar species, while the B-type genomes seem to descend from a close relative of F. iinumae. The exact process of hybridization and speciation which resulted in the octoploid species is still unknown, but it appears that the genome compositions of both F. chiloensis and F. virginiana (and by extension the cultivated octoploid strawberry as well) are identical.

=== History ===
The cultivated garden strawberry — also known as F. × ananassa — developed in 18th-century Europe from a man-made hybridization of F. chiloensis and the North American F. virginiana. In 1714, vegetation of the F. × ananassa family was transported from Chile to France by a handful of important figures in higher academia. French mathematician Amédée-François Frézier was perhaps the most principal leader here, moving roughly five living plants of the F. × ananassa variant into Chile. Quickly thereafter, subordinate agricultural workers in Brittany, France, started to grow subtypes of the strawberry near pre-existing F. virginiana stocks, leading to hybrids that many biologists noted as “superior and interspecific” for the time.

Originated primarily by Frézier in the 1750s, F. chiloensis proceeded to undergo nearly 300 years of biological reconstruction. For example, European cultivators — such as Antoine Nicolas Duchesne — stacked alleles of the strawberry from its ancestral species, including but not limited to F. × ananassa, so as to grow plants with more favorable size, yield, and flavor. Essentially, the goal here was to create a supremely profitable organism, one that would be attractive to marketers in the agriculture industry.

After the 19th century, French agriculturalists began to move the F. × chiloensis plant into North America, particularly regions of the Pacific coastline. Initially, European cultivators believed that the species would not thrive in said area given the conventionally mild, temperate climate of states like Washington, Oregon, and California. However, this feature became the very reason that the species was able to thrive. The F. × chiloensis sustained itself on the region’s maritime, humid weather, as well as its sandy, mud-packed soils. Together, these elements provided an optimal environment for the stolon growth and fruit development integral to the plant. As such, the species dispersed rapidly, making it perhaps the most popular representative of the Fragaria species.

Beyond historical origins, further clarity about the F. × chiloensis plant can be found by examining its genealogical history. Similar to other strawberry variants, the F. chiloensis species arose from an “octoploid lineage” that currently produces F. virginiana plants — though it dates back to the 16th-century, having formed through the merger of four diploid progenitor lineages. This element, discovered through biological study, explains the picturesque red and white phenotype and agricultural breeding that’s integral to the character of the beach strawberry.

== Subspecies ==
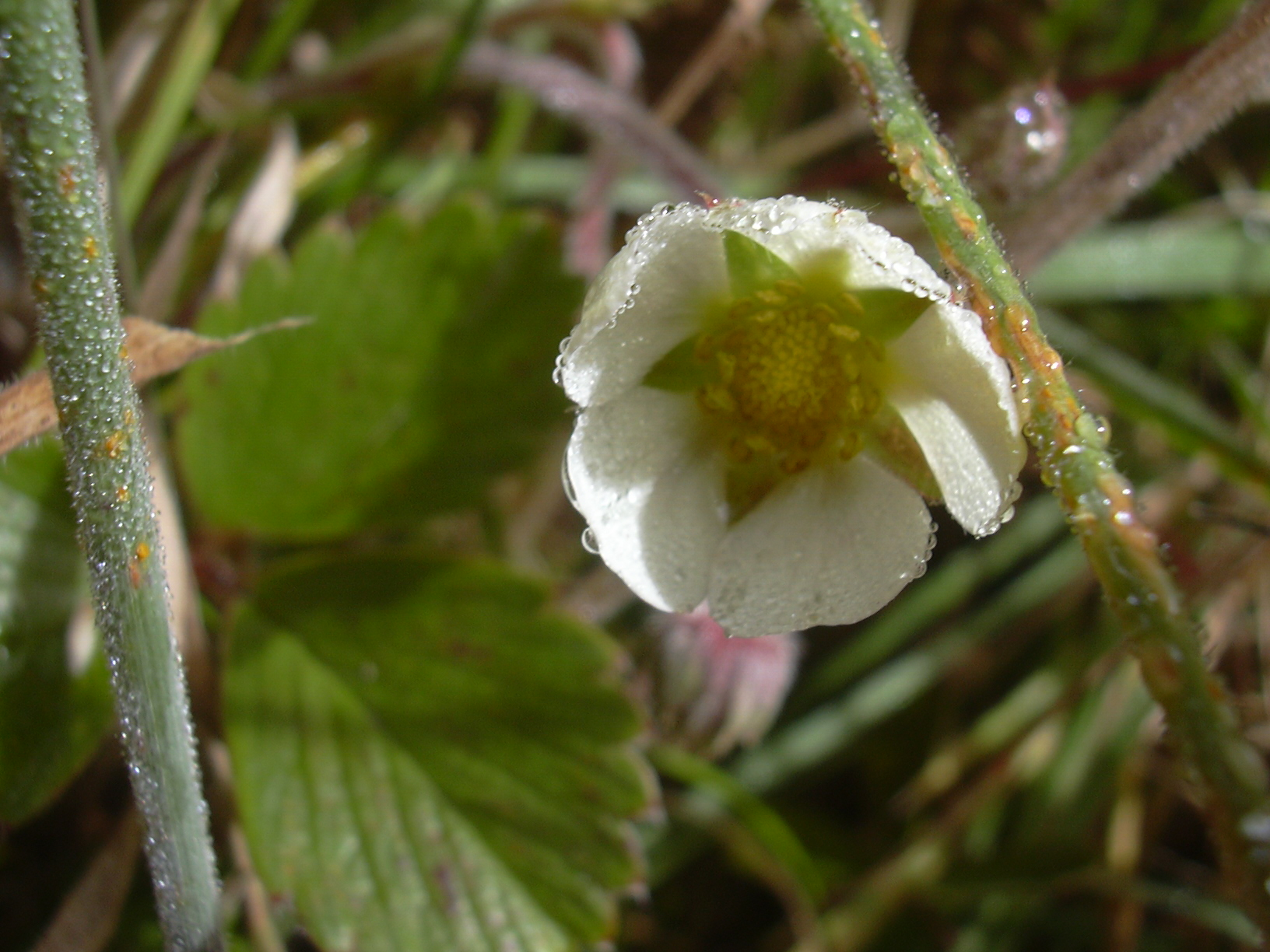
Flower of F. chiloensis subsp. chiloensis forma chiloensis

There are a number of subspecies and forms:

- Fragaria chiloensis subsp. chiloensis forma chiloensis
- Fragaria chiloensis subsp. chiloensis forma patagonica (Argentina, Chile)
- Fragaria chiloensis subsp. lucida (E. Vilm. ex Gay) Staudt (coast of British Columbia, Washington, Oregon, California)
- Fragaria chiloensis subsp. pacifica Staudt (coast of Alaska, British Columbia, Washington, Oregon, California)
- Fragaria chiloensis subsp. sandwicensis (Decne.) Staudt – ʻŌhelo papa (Hawaii)
  - Endemic to the east Maui island and the Hawaii island. Considered "less common [on Hawaii] than it was in past decades." due to a possible pathogen leading to population decline.

== Distribution and habitat ==
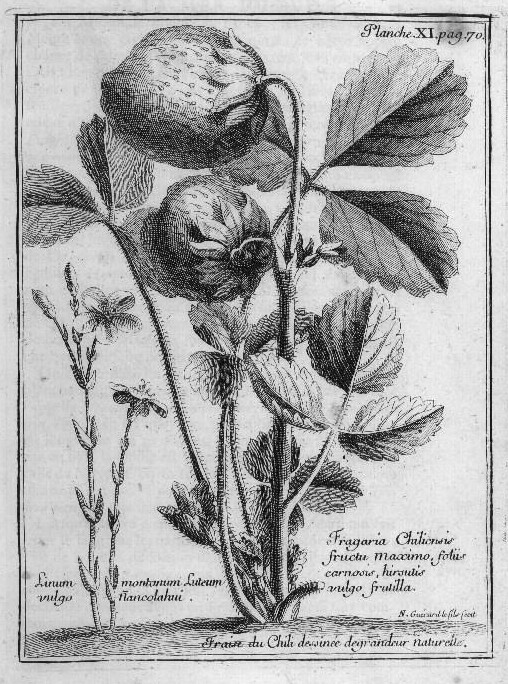
Illustrated in Amédée-François Frézier's account of his voyage to South America (1716)

The plant's natural range is the Pacific Ocean coasts of North and South America, and also Hawaii, where it grows mostly on sand beaches above the tidal zone in temperate to warm-temperate regions. Migratory birds are thought to have dispersed F. chiloensis from the Pacific coast of North America to the mountains of Hawaii, Chile, and Argentina.

Amédée-François Frézier (1682–1773) was the first to bring back specimens of the species to the Old World.

== Ecology ==
Chaetosiphon fragaefolii, the strawberry aphid, is a bug species found to feed on F. chiloensis in Chile. It is a vector of the strawberry mild yellow-edge virus (SMYEV), a pathogen that impacts several species in the Fragaria genus. Sites with abundant aphids are associated with an increased incidence of SMYEV. With the presence of the aphid-borne virus, ecological consequences could result, such as reduced plant growth, vigor, and yield. Based on the genetic patterns of Chaetosiphon fragaefolii, human activities contribute mainly to their dispersal, while the dissemination to natural habitats is limited and not large-scale.

Some clones of F. chiloensis, such as ‘Del Norte’ and ‘Yaquina’, are also found to be resistant to aphids. In field trials, fewer aphids were found on these clones compared to other cultivated strawberries, suggesting the future potential for breeding programs that could help boost the resistance of F. chiloensis.

== Adaptation ==
Fragaria chiloensis spreads by stolons, forming clones along the coast. The clones triggered by stolons enable the species to laterally expand and rapidly recover after sand burial. These connected ramets share nutrients and water via stems, which increases their survival rate in coastal dunes that are deficient in nutrients. Through this sharing system, older ramets transfer carbon and nitrogen to younger ramets, hence increasing their total biomass and the growth of patches.

In coastal, sandy habitats, Fragaria chiloensis is relatively drought-resistant compared with other Fragaria or cultivated species. This trait has been utilized by breeders wishing to improve crop performance while developing new strawberry varieties in dry conditions. Moreover, some genotypes of F. chiloensis, such as the F. chiloensis f. patagonica genotype, also demonstrate tolerance to salinity or salty conditions. When this occurs, the species changes its way of regulating osmosis, gas exchange and pigment levels, as well as how it manages water and minerals. These alterations mitigate ionic stress and enable the plant to thrive and continue growing, especially in salty, coastal habitats.

== Uses ==
Its fruit is sold as a local delicacy in some South American produce markets.

The beach strawberry is gathered by several native groups, especially on the pacific coast of North America. The Makah, Quileute, and Quinault native groups in Washington, Wiyot and Pomo in California, gathered the fruit as a food source. Tribes also used different parts of the plant other than its fruit for medicinal purposes, such as the Quileute tribe that chewed the leaves and applied it as a burn relief paste. California tribes also brewed the leaves as a tea to ingest its high vitamin c content and the roots are used for stomach relief and dental/gum health.
