= Chaetosiphon tetrarhodum =

Scientific classification
- Kingdom: Animalia
- Phylum: Arthropoda
- Class: Insecta
- Order: Hemiptera
- Suborder: Sternorrhyncha
- Family: Aphididae
- Genus: Chaetosiphon
- Species: C. tetrarhodum

Binomial name
- Chaetosiphon tetrarhodum (Walker, 1849)

Species of true bug

Chaetosiphon tetrarhodum, the small green rose aphid, also known as Chaetosiphon (Pentatrichopus) tetrarhodum, is an aphid in the order Hemiptera. It is a true bug and sucks sap from plants.
