= Chaetosiphon (aphid) =

Scientific classification
- Kingdom: Animalia
- Phylum: Arthropoda
- Class: Insecta
- Order: Hemiptera
- Suborder: Sternorrhyncha
- Family: Aphididae
- Subfamily: Aphidinae
- Tribe: Macrosiphini
- Genus: Chaetosiphon; Mordvilko, 1914

Species
- Chaetosiphon fragaefolii; Chaetosiphon hottesi; Chaetosiphon minor; Chaetosiphon potentillae; Chaetosiphon scalaris; Chaetosiphon tetrarhodum; Chaetosiphon thomasi

Genus of true bugs

Chaetosiphon is a bug genus in the family Aphididae.

Species, mainly C. fragaefolii, C. thomasi and C. jacobi, are vectors of the strawberry mild yellow-edge virus.
