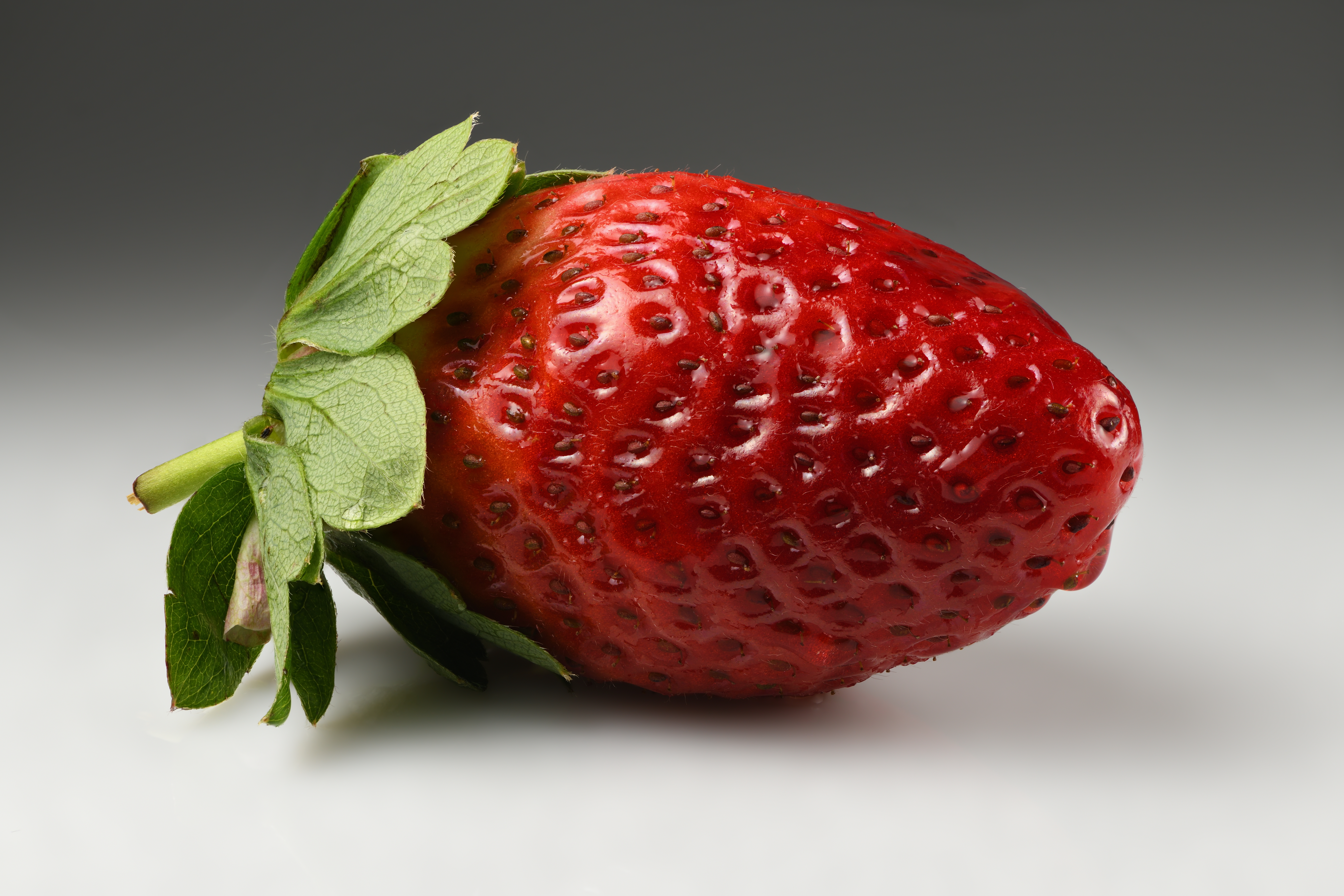
- Strawberry fruit

Scientific classification
- Kingdom: Plantae
- Clade: Tracheophytes
- Clade: Angiosperms
- Clade: Eudicots
- Clade: Rosids
- Order: Rosales
- Family: Rosaceae
- Genus: Fragaria
- Species: F. × ananassa

Binomial name
- Fragaria × ananassa Duchesne

= Strawberry =

Edible fruit

The garden strawberry (or simply strawberry; Fragaria × ananassa) is a widely grown hybrid plant cultivated worldwide for its fruit. The genus Fragaria, the strawberries, is in the rose family, Rosaceae. The fruit is appreciated for its aroma, bright red colour, juicy texture, and sweetness. It is eaten either fresh or in prepared foods such as jam, ice cream, and chocolates. Artificial strawberry flavourings and aromas are widely used in commercial products. Botanically, the strawberry is not a berry, but an aggregate accessory fruit. Each apparent 'seed' on the outside of the strawberry is actually an achene, a botanical fruit with a seed inside it.

The garden strawberry was first bred in Brittany, France, in the 1750s via a cross of F. virginiana from eastern North America and F. chiloensis, which was brought from Chile by Amédée-François Frézier in 1714. Cultivars of F. × ananassa have replaced the musk strawberry F. moschata in commercial production. In 2024, world production of strawberries exceeded ten million tons, led by China with 38% of the total.

Strawberries have appeared in literature and art from Roman times; Virgil wrote about the snake lurking beneath the strawberry, an image reinterpreted by later writers including Shakespeare. Strawberries appear in Italian, Flemish, and German paintings, including Hieronymus Bosch's The Garden of Earthly Delights. It has been understood to symbolise the ephemerality of earthly joys or the benefit that blessed souls get from religion, or to allegorise death and resurrection. By the late 20th century, its meaning had shifted: it symbolised female sexuality.

== Evolution ==
=== History and taxonomy ===
In Europe, until the 17th century cultivated plants were obtained by transplanting strawberries from the forests; the plants were propagated asexually by pegging down the runners, allowing them to root, and then separating the new plants. F. virginiana, the Virginia strawberry, was brought to Europe from eastern North America; F. chiloensis, the Chilean strawberry, was brought from Chile by Amédée-François Frézier in 1714. At first introduction to Europe, the Chilean strawberry plants grew vigorously, but produced no fruit. French gardeners in Brittany in the 1750s noticed that the Chilean plants bore only female flowers. They planted the wild woodland strawberry F. vesca among the Chilean plants to provide pollen; the Chilean strawberry plants then bore abundant fruits.

In 1759, Philip Miller recorded the 'pine strawberry' (F. ananassa) in Chelsea, England. In the gardens of the Palace of Versailles, France, Antoine Nicolas Duchesne found in 1766 that F. ananassa was a hybrid of the recently arrived F. chiloensis and F. virginiana. In 1806, Michael Keens of Isleworth, England selected the Keens Imperial cultivar from many hybrids, winning the Royal Horticultural Society's Silver Cup. Both the names 'pine' and 'ananassa' meant "pineapple", for the fruit's flavour. Modern strawberries and both parent species are octoploid (8N, meaning they have 8 sets of 7 chromosomes). The genome sequence of the garden strawberry was published in 2019.

Hybridisation and polyploidy in strawberries. Garden strawberries are octoploid (8N), like both parents, the Virginia and Chilean strawberries.

Further breeding in the following centuries produced varieties with a longer cropping season and more fruit. During the Green Revolution of the 1950s, agronomists used selective breeding to expand phenotypic diversity of the garden strawberry. Adoption of perpetual flowering hybrids not sensitive to changes in photoperiod gave higher yields and enabled production in California to expand.

History of European strawberry culture

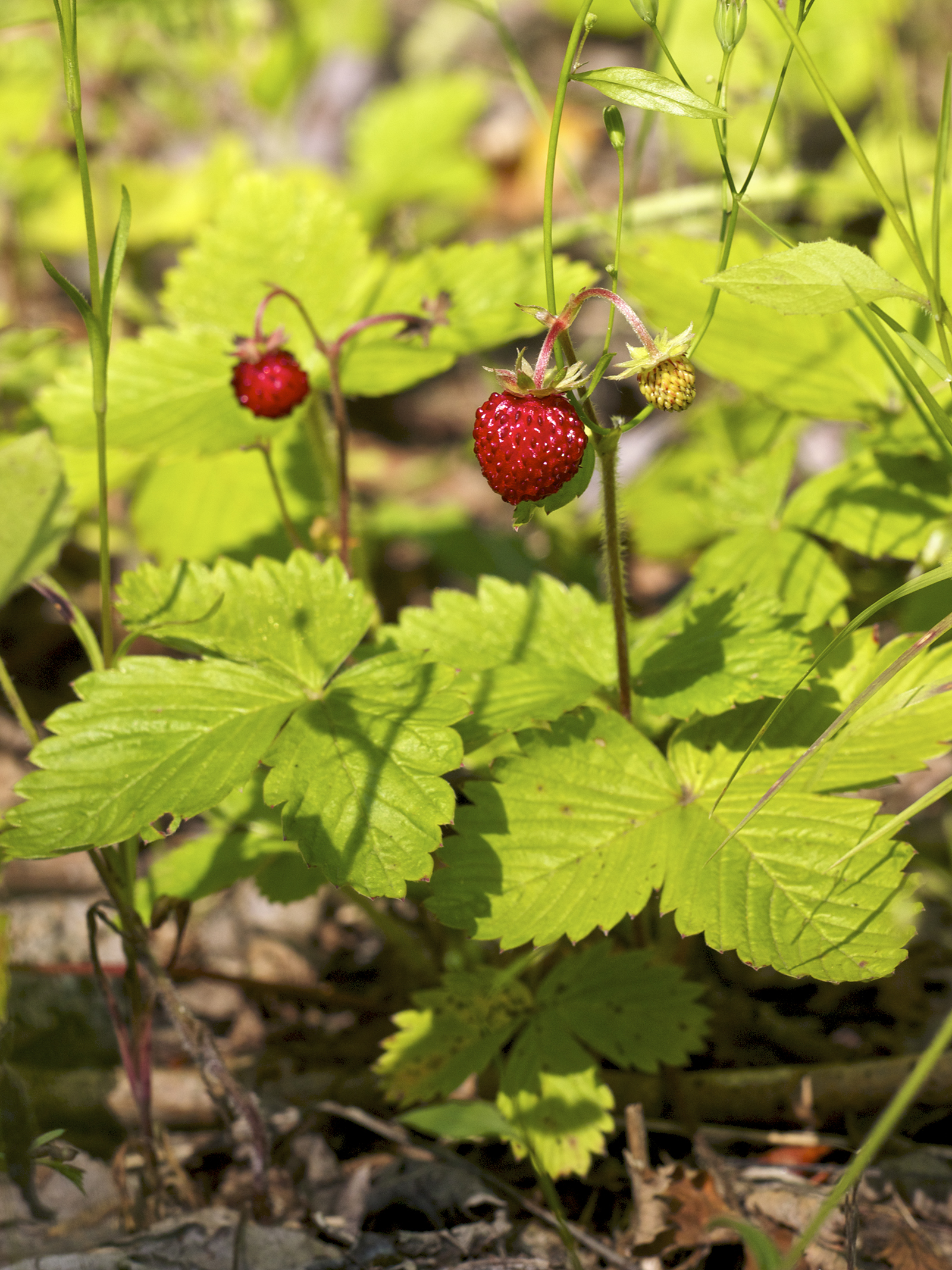
Fragaria vesca, the small wild woodland strawberry, was commonly collected from the wild

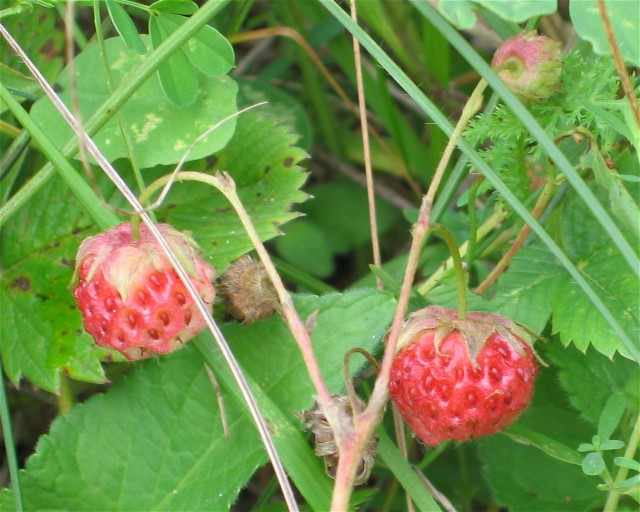
In the east, the grassland species Fragaria viridis was used like F.vesca

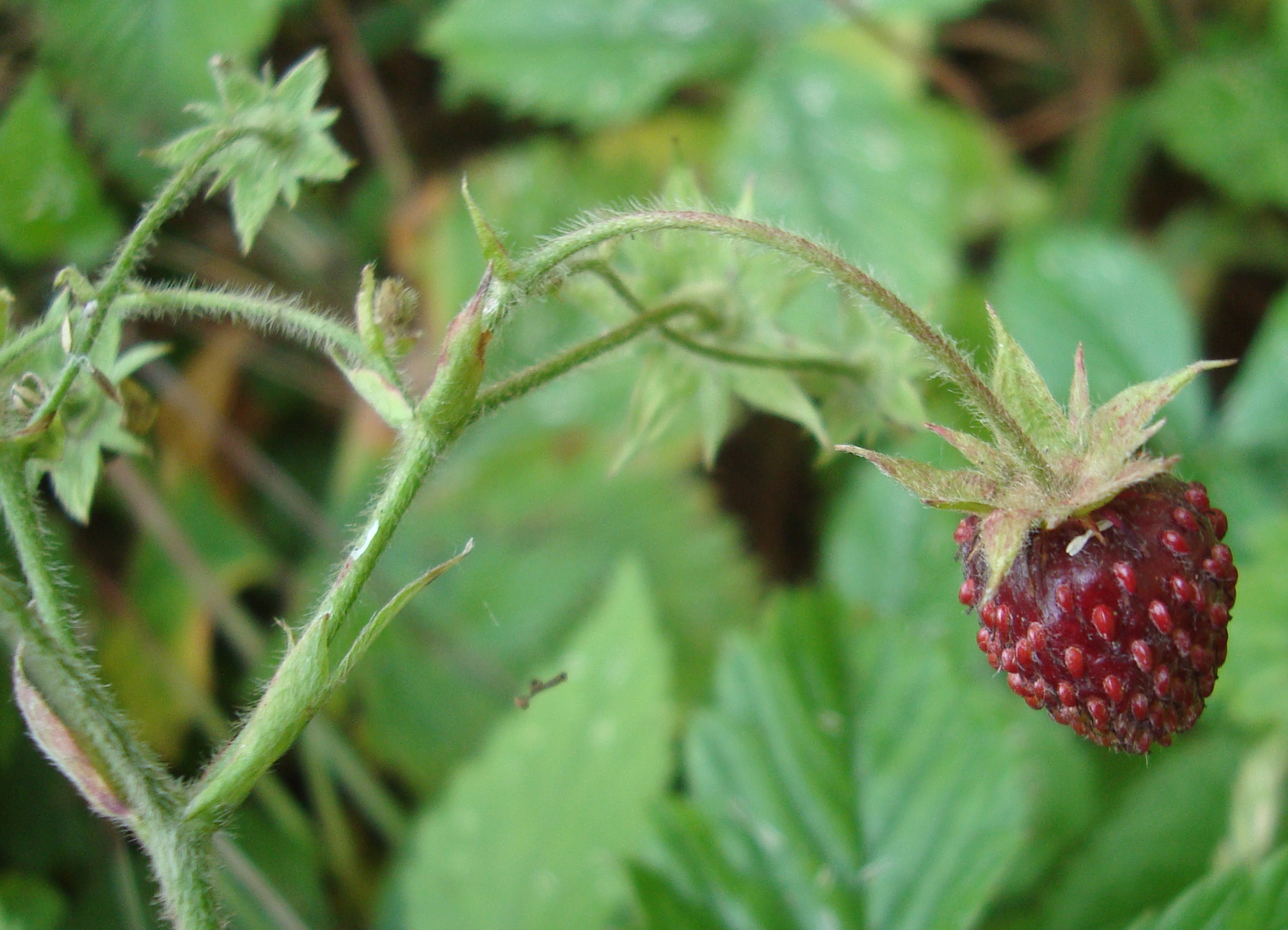
Fragaria moschata, the musk strawberry or "hautbois" ("high woodland"), was the main commercially grown species until the 18th century.

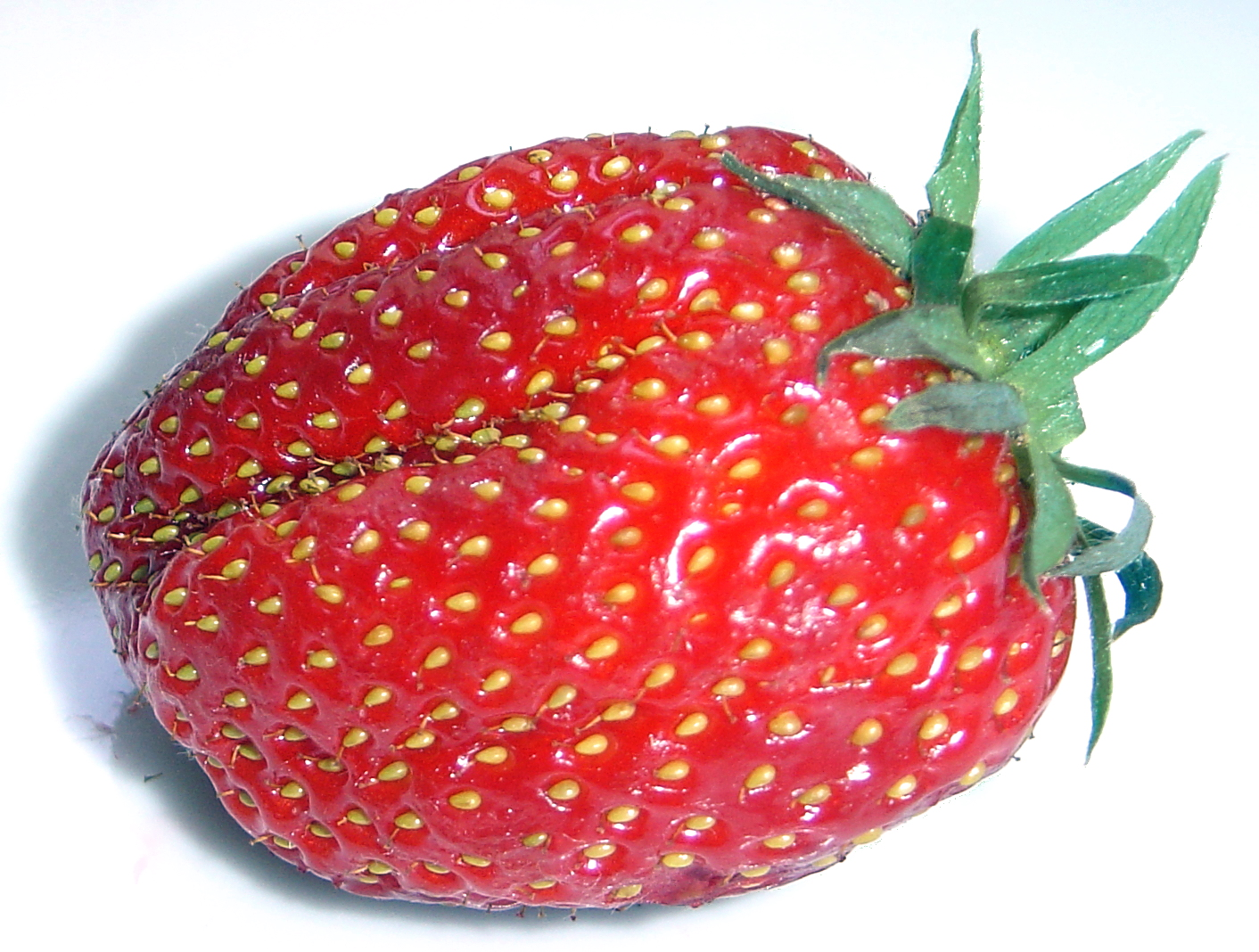
Antoine Nicolas Duchesne discovered that the cultivated strawberry ('Gariguette' pictured) was a hybrid of F. chiloensis and F. virginiana.

=== Phylogeny ===
The phylogeny of the cultivated strawberry within the genus Fragaria of the Rosaceae family was determined by chloroplast genomics in 2021. The polyploidy (number of sets of chromosomes) is shown as "2N" etc. by each species.

- Rosaceae
  - Rosa and other genera
  - - Potentilla (cinquefoils)
    - Fragaria
      - at least 11 other species
      - - F. viridis 2N (green strawberry)
        - - - F. orientalis 4N (eastern strawberry)
            - F. moschata 6N (musk strawberry)
          - - F. mandshurica
            - - F. vesca ssp. vesca 2N (wild strawberry)
              - - F. vesca ssp. bracteata 2N
                - - F. virginiana 8N (Virginia strawberry, parent species)
                  - - F. chiloensis 8N (Chilean strawberry, parent species)
                    - F. x ananassa 8N (the hybrid garden strawberry)

== Description ==
Botanical structure of a strawberry, compared to a peapod. The strawberry is a swollen receptacle, covered with many small achenes, the botanical fruits.

In culinary terms, a strawberry is an edible fruit. From a botanical point of view, it is not a berry but an aggregate accessory fruit, because the fleshy part is derived from the receptacle. Each apparent seed on the outside of the strawberry is actually an achene, a botanical fruit with a seed inside it.

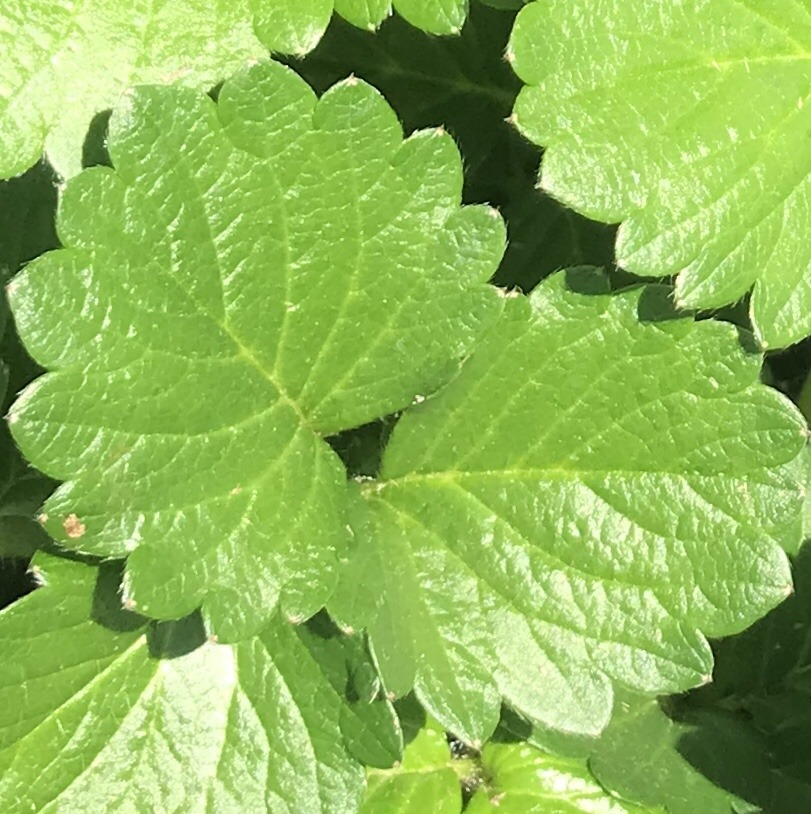
Leaves

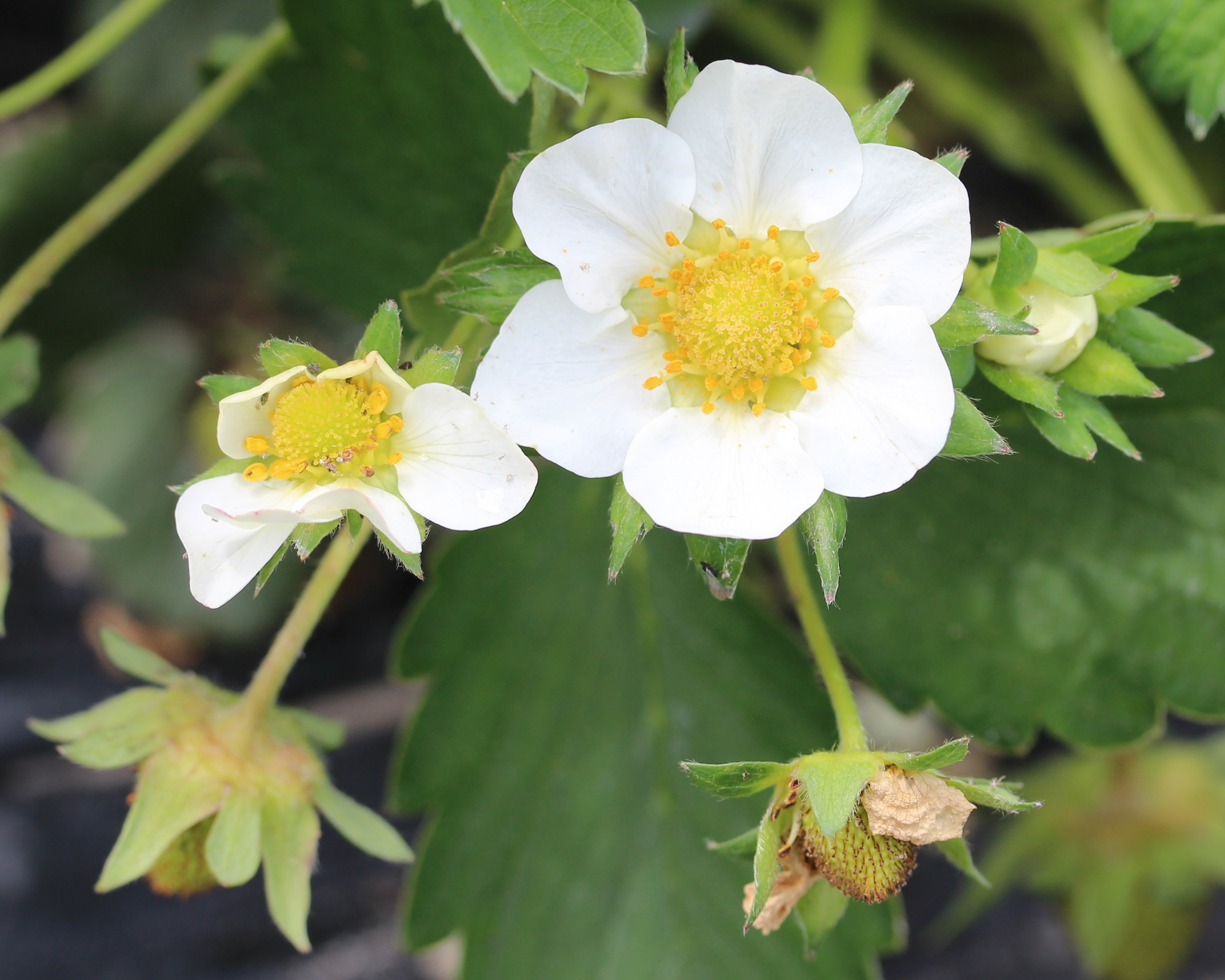
Flower

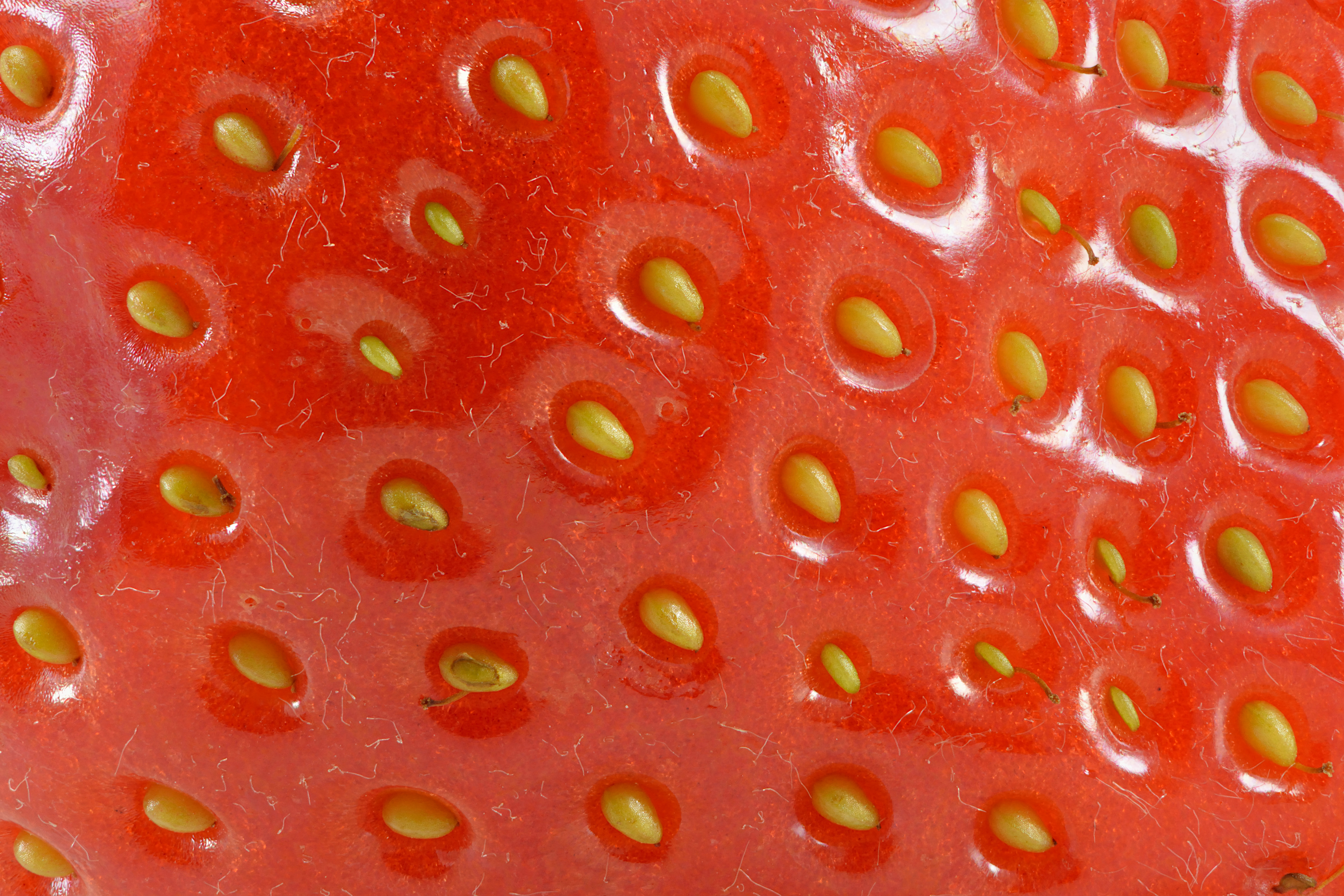
Achenes (botanical fruits)

Growth (video)

== Composition ==
=== Nutrition ===
Nutrition
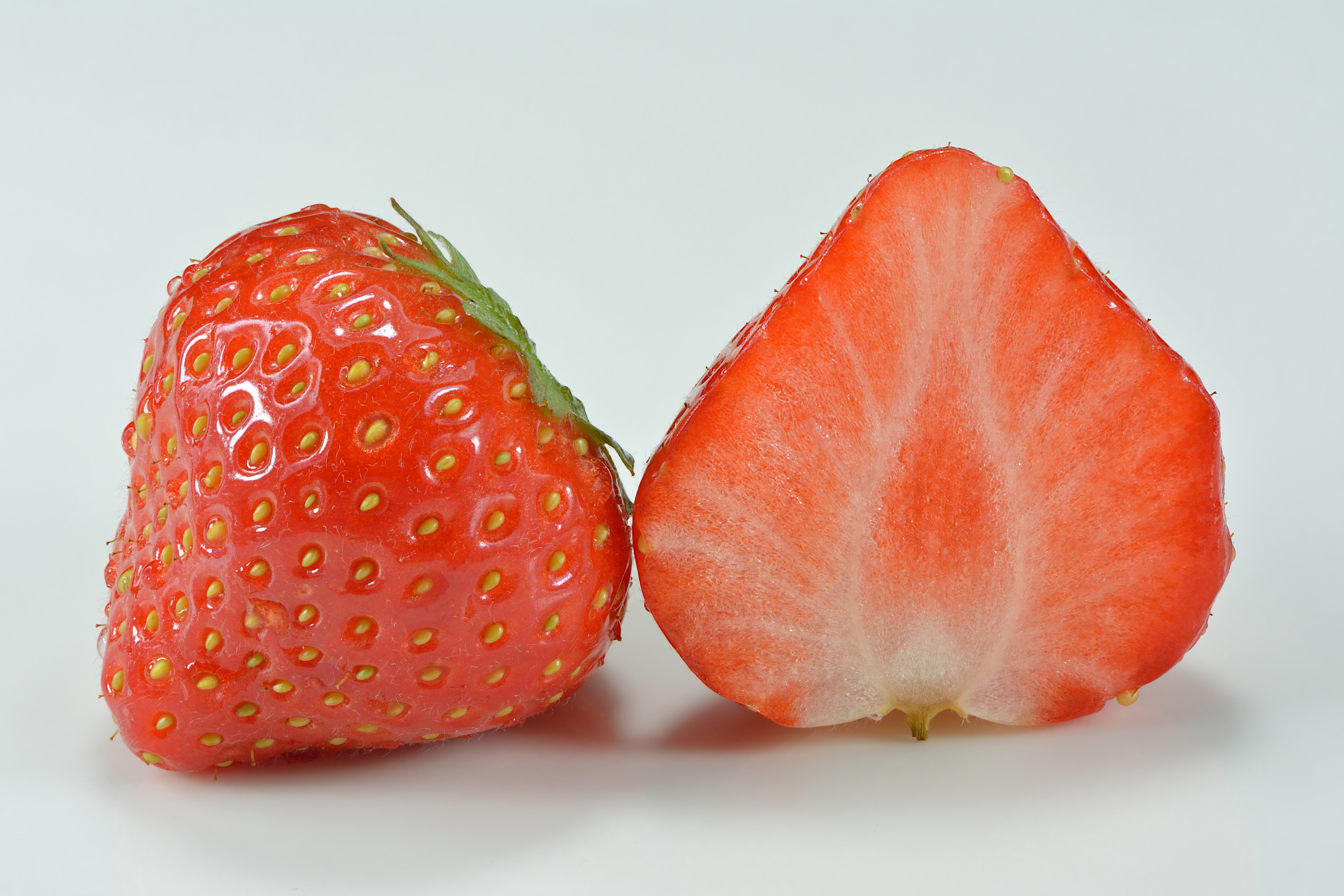

Nutritional value per 100 g (3.5 oz)
- Energy: 136 kJ (33 kcal)
- Carbohydrates: 7.68 g
- Sugars: 4.89 g
- Dietary fiber: 2 g
- Fat: 0.3 g
- Protein: 0.67 g
Vitamins and minerals
Vitamins	Quantity %DV^{†}
Thiamine (B1)	2% 0.024 mg
Riboflavin (B2)	2% 0.022 mg
Niacin (B3)	2% 0.386 mg
Pantothenic acid (B5)	3% 0.125 mg
Vitamin B6	3% 0.047 mg
Folate (B9)	6% 24 μg
Choline	1% 5.7 mg
Vitamin C	65% 58.8 mg
Vitamin E	2% 0.29 mg
Vitamin K	2% 2.2 μg
Minerals	Quantity %DV^{†}
Calcium	1% 16 mg
Iron	2% 0.41 mg
Magnesium	3% 13 mg
Manganese	17% 0.386 mg
Phosphorus	2% 24 mg
Potassium	5% 154 mg
Sodium	0% 1 mg
Zinc	1% 0.14 mg
- Other constituents: Quantity
- Water: 90.95 g
- Link to USDA Database entry
- ^{†}Percentages estimated using US recommendations for adults, except for potassium, which is estimated based on expert recommendation from the National Academies.

Raw strawberries are 91% water, 8% carbohydrates, 1% protein, and contain negligible fat (table). A reference amount of 100 grams (3.5 oz) supplies 33 kilocalories, is a rich source of vitamin C (65% of the Daily Value, DV), and a good source of manganese (17% DV), with no other micronutrients in significant content (table). Strawberries contain a modest amount of essential unsaturated fatty acids in the achene (seed) oil.

=== Phytochemicals ===
Garden strawberries contain diverse phytochemicals, including the dimeric ellagitannin agrimoniin, which is an isomer of sanguiin H-6. Other polyphenols present include flavonoids, such as anthocyanins, flavanols, flavonols and phenolic acids, such as hydroxybenzoic acid and hydroxycinnamic acid. Although achenes comprise only about 1% of the total fresh weight of a strawberry, they contribute 11% of all polyphenols in the whole fruit; achene phytochemicals include ellagic acid, ellagic acid glycosides, and ellagitannins.

Pelargonidin-3-glucoside is the major anthocyanin pigment in strawberries, giving them their red colour, with cyanidin-3-glucoside in smaller amounts. Strawberries also contain purple minor pigments, such as dimeric anthocyanins.

=== Flavour and fragrance ===
Furaneol contributes to the fragrance of strawberries.

Sweetness, fragrance and complex flavour are important attributes of strawberries. In plant breeding and farming, emphasis is placed on sugars, acids, and volatile compounds, which improve the taste and fragrance of the ripe fruit. Esters, terpenes, and furans are the chemical compounds having the strongest relationships to strawberry flavour, sweetness and fragrance, with a total of 31 out of some 360 volatile compounds significantly correlated to desirable flavour and fragrance. In breeding strawberries for the commercial market in the United States, the volatile compounds methyl anthranilate and gamma-decalactone, prominent in aromatic wild strawberries, are especially desired for their "sweet and fruity" aroma characteristics. As strawberry flavour and fragrance appeal to consumers, they are used widely in manufacturing, including foods, beverages, perfumes and cosmetics.

=== Allergy ===
Some people experience an anaphylactoid reaction to eating strawberries. The most common form of this reaction is oral allergy syndrome, but symptoms may also mimic hay fever or include dermatitis or hives, and, in severe cases, may cause breathing problems. Proteomic studies indicate that the allergen may be tied to a protein for the red anthocyanin biosynthesis expressed in strawberry ripening, named Fra a1 (Fragaria allergen1). White-fruited strawberry cultivars, lacking Fra a1, may be an option for people allergic to strawberries. They ripen but remain pale, appearing like immature berries. A virtually allergen-free cultivar named 'Sofar' is available.

== Varieties ==
Strawberries are often grouped according to their flowering habit. Strawberries occur in three basic flowering habits: short-day, long-day, and day-neutral. These describe the day-length sensitivity of the plant and the type of photoperiod that induces flower formation. Day-neutral cultivars produce flowers regardless of the photoperiod. Strawberry cultivars vary widely in attributes such as disease resistance, dessert and freezing quality, yield, and season of ripening.

== Cultivation ==
=== Production ===
Strawberry production 2024, millions of tonnes
China	4.1
United States	1.5
Egypt	0.9
Mexico	0.7
Turkey	0.6
Spain	0.3
World	10.7
Source: FAOSTAT of the United Nations

In 2024, world production of strawberries was 10.7 million tonnes, led by China with 38% of the total and the United States as a secondary producer (table).

Strawberry yield

Production of strawberries

=== Cultivation methods ===
For commercial production, plants can be propagated from bare root plants or plugs. One method of cultivation uses annual plasticulture; another is a perennial system of matted rows or mounds which has been used in cold growing regions for many years. In some areas, greenhouses are used; in principle they can provide strawberries during the off season for field crops.

In the plasticulture system, raised beds are covered with plastic to prevent weed growth and erosion. Plants are planted through holes punched in this covering. Irrigation tubing can be run underneath if necessary.

Another method uses a compost sock. Plants grown in compost socks have been shown to produce significantly more flavonoids, anthocyanins, fructose, glucose, sucrose, malic acid, and citric acid than fruit produced in the black plastic mulch or matted row systems. An earlier study by the United States Department of Agriculture confirms the value of compost.

Strawberries may be propagated by seed. Strawberries can be grown indoors in pots. Strawberries will not grow indoors in winter though an experiment using a combination of blue and red LED lamps shows that this could be achieved in principle. In Florida, winter is the natural growing season and harvesting begins in mid-November.

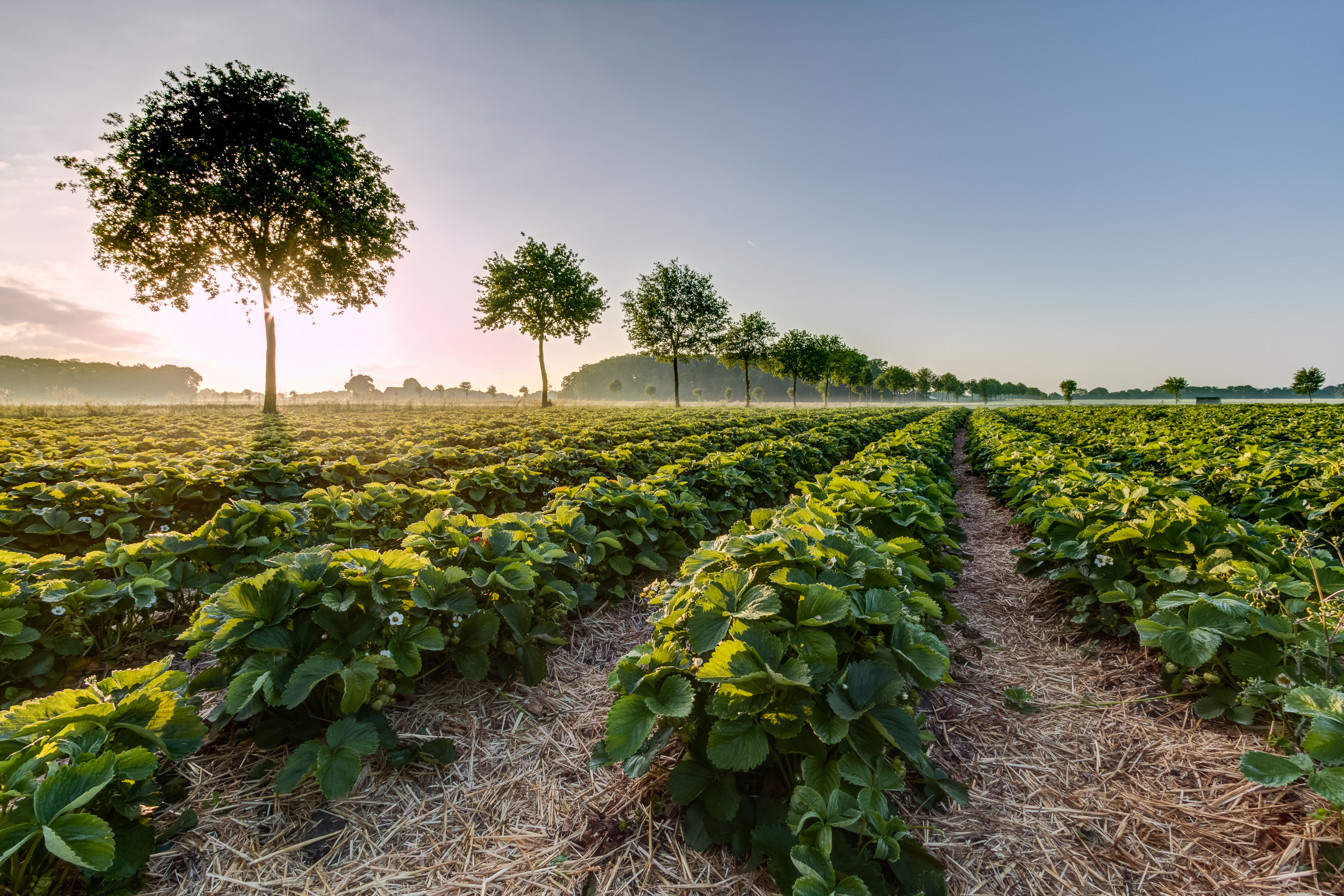
Strawberry field in North Rhine-Westphalia, Germany

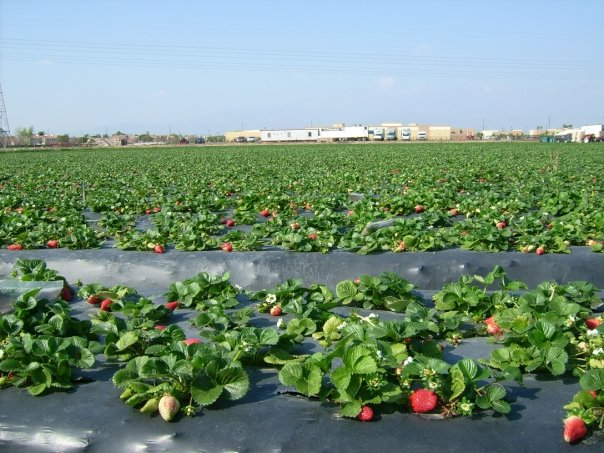
A field using the plasticulture method

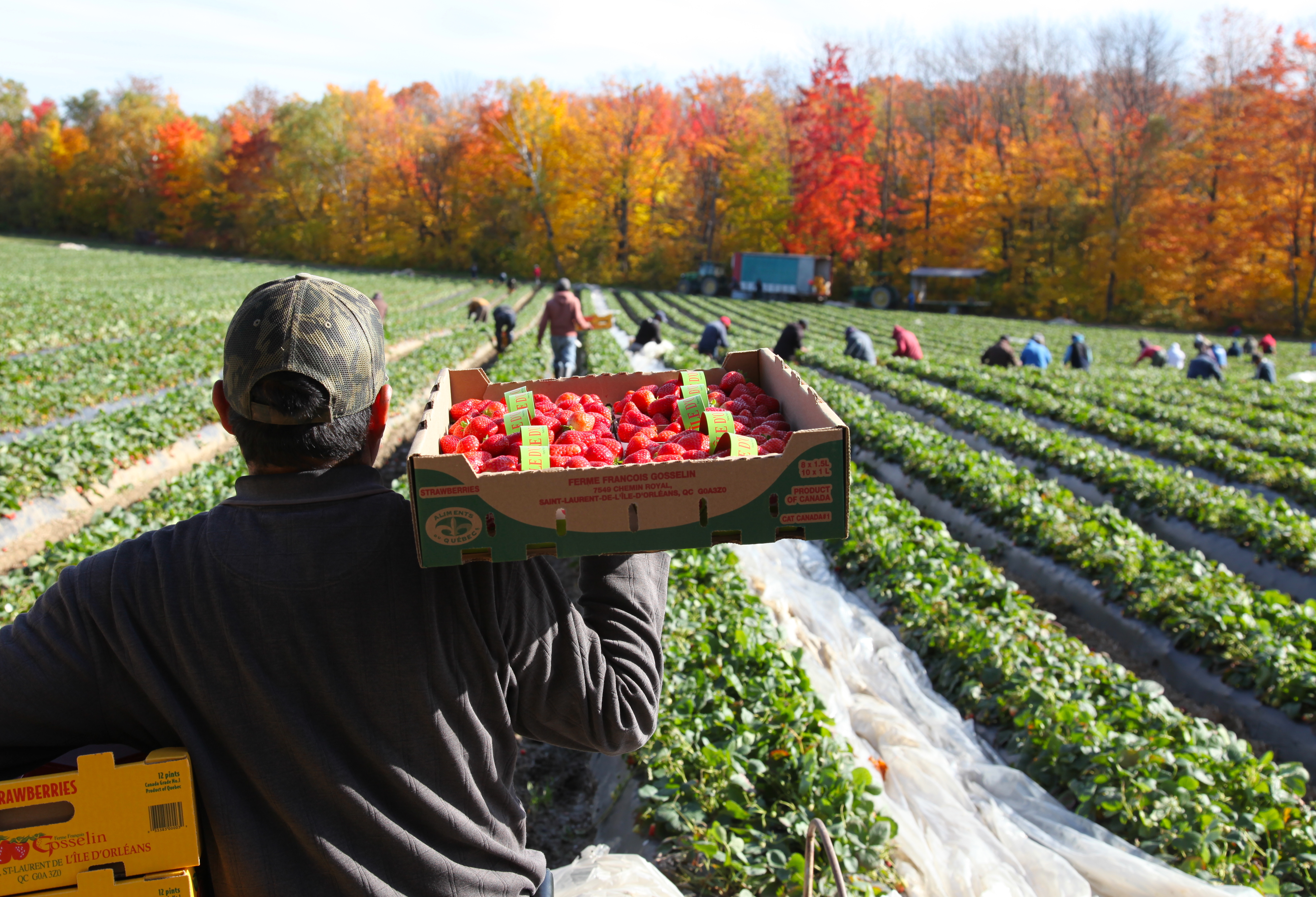
Strawberries are usually picked and placed in shallow boxes in the field.

=== Domestic cultivation ===
Strawberries are popular in home gardens, and numerous cultivars have been selected for consumption and for exhibition purposes. The following cultivars have gained the Royal Horticultural Society's Award of Garden Merit:

- 'Cambridge Favourite'
- 'Hapil'
- 'Honeoye'
- 'Pegasus'
- 'Rhapsody'
- 'Symphony'

=== Pests and diseases ===
Over 200 species of pest arthropods attack strawberries. These include moths, fruit flies, chafers, strawberry root weevils, strawberry thrips, strawberry sap beetles, strawberry crown moth, mites, and aphids. Non-arthropod pests include slugs. Some are vectors of plant diseases; for instance, the strawberry aphid, Chaetosiphon fragaefolii, can carry the strawberry mild yellow-edge virus.

Strawberry plants are subject to many diseases, especially when subjected to stress. The leaves may be infected by powdery mildew, leaf spot (caused by the fungus Sphaerella fragariae), leaf blight (caused by the fungus Phomopsis obscurans), and by a variety of slime molds. The crown and roots may fall victim to red stele, verticillium wilt, black root rot, and nematodes. The fruits are subject to damage from gray mold (Botrytis cinerea), rhizopus rot, and leather rot.

=== Disease resistance and protection ===
The NPR1 gene from Arabidopsis thaliana, AtNPR1, confers A. thaliana's broad-spectrum resistance when transexpressed in F. ananassa. This includes resistance to anthracnose, powdery mildew, and angular leaf spot.

A 1997 study found that many wound volatiles were effective against gray mold (B. cinerea). Both Tribute and Chandler varieties benefited from the treatments, although the effects vary widely with substance and variety. Strawberry plants metabolise these volatiles, more rapidly than do either blackberry or grape.

== Culinary use ==
Strawberries were eaten fresh with cream in the time of Thomas Wolsey in the court of King Henry VIII. Strawberries can be frozen or made into jam or preserves, as well as dried and used in prepared foods, such as cereal bars. In the United Kingdom, strawberries and cream is a popular dessert at the Wimbledon tennis tournament. Desserts using strawberries include pavlova, fraisier, and strawberry shortcake.

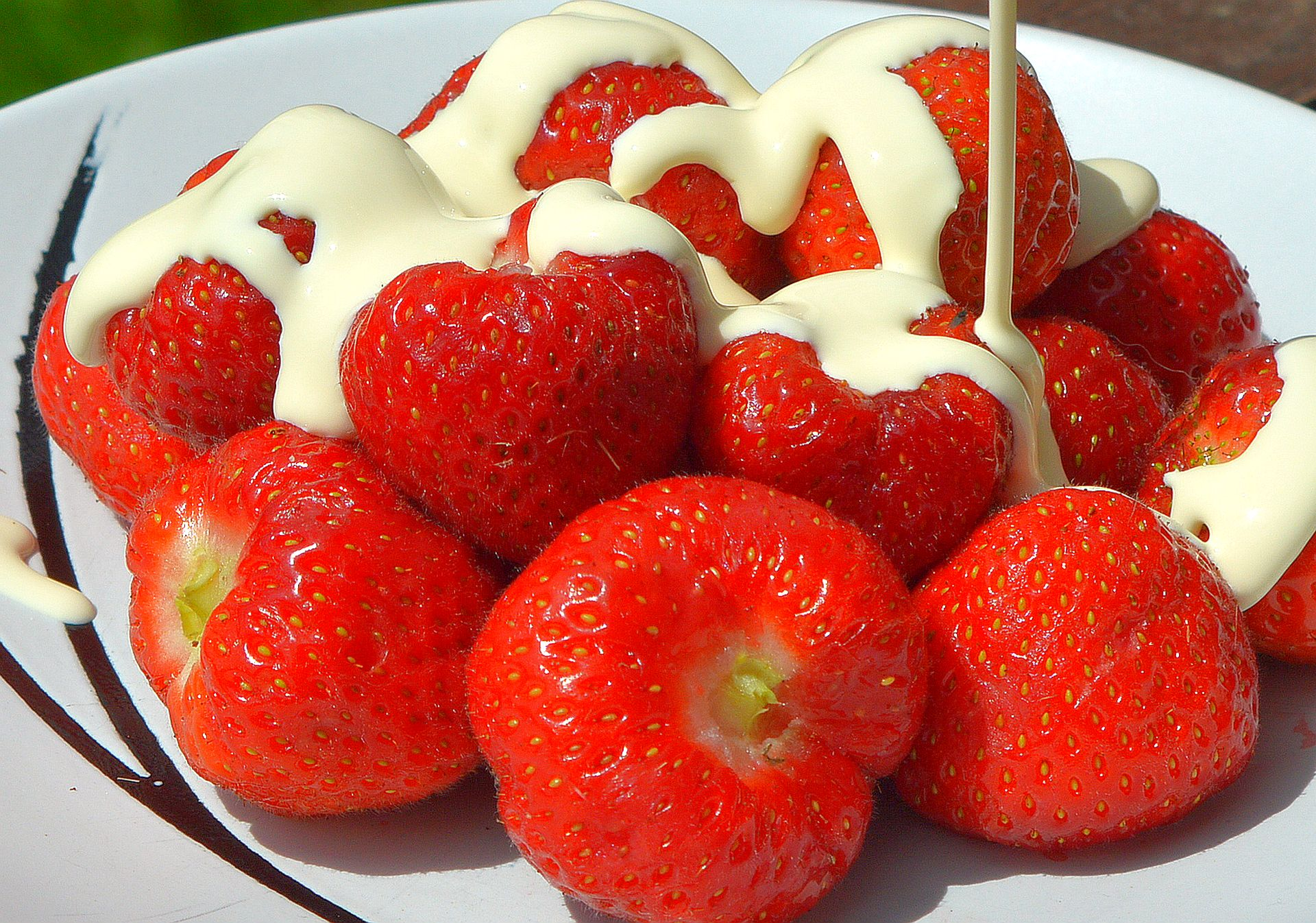
Strawberries and cream

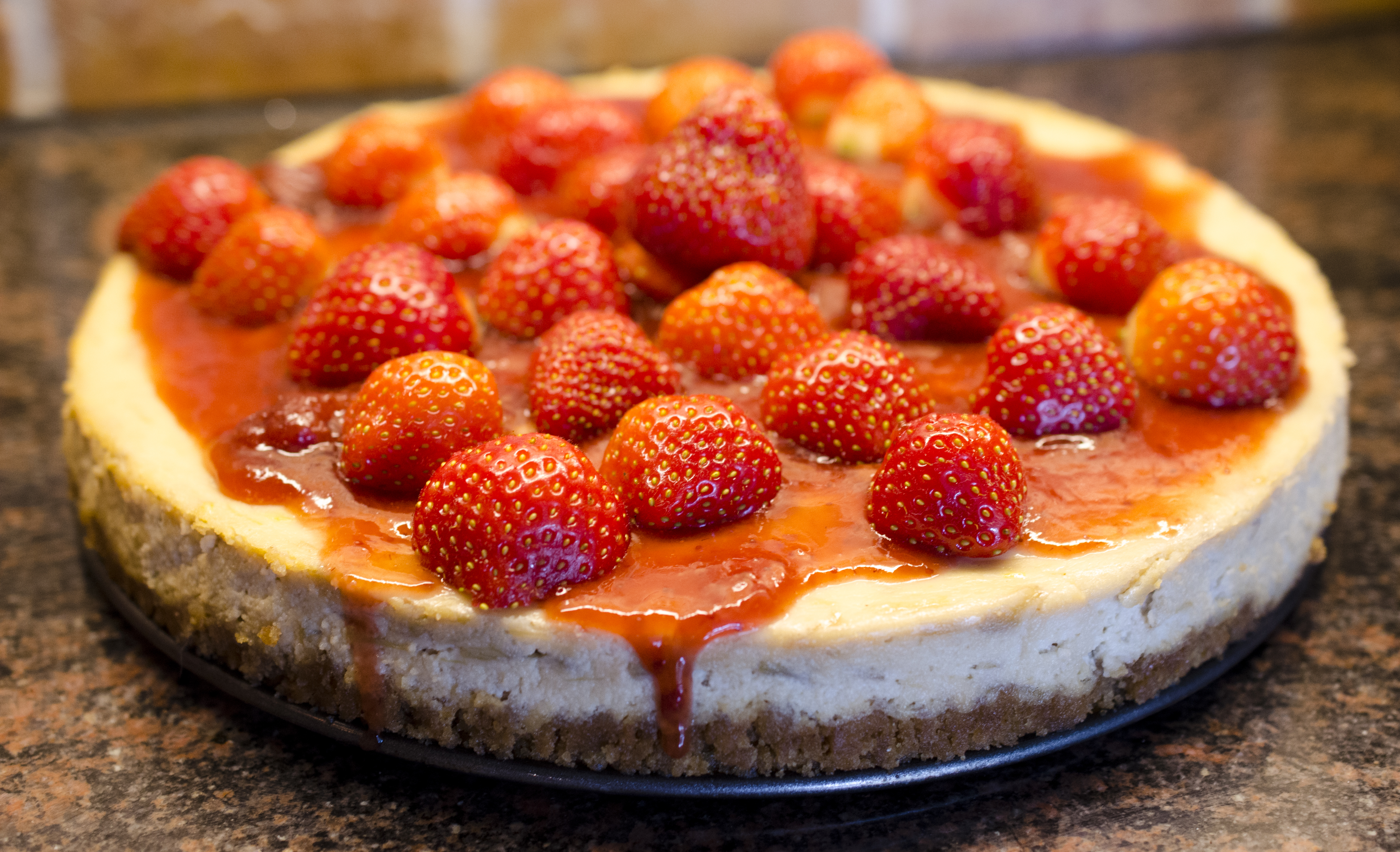
Cheesecake

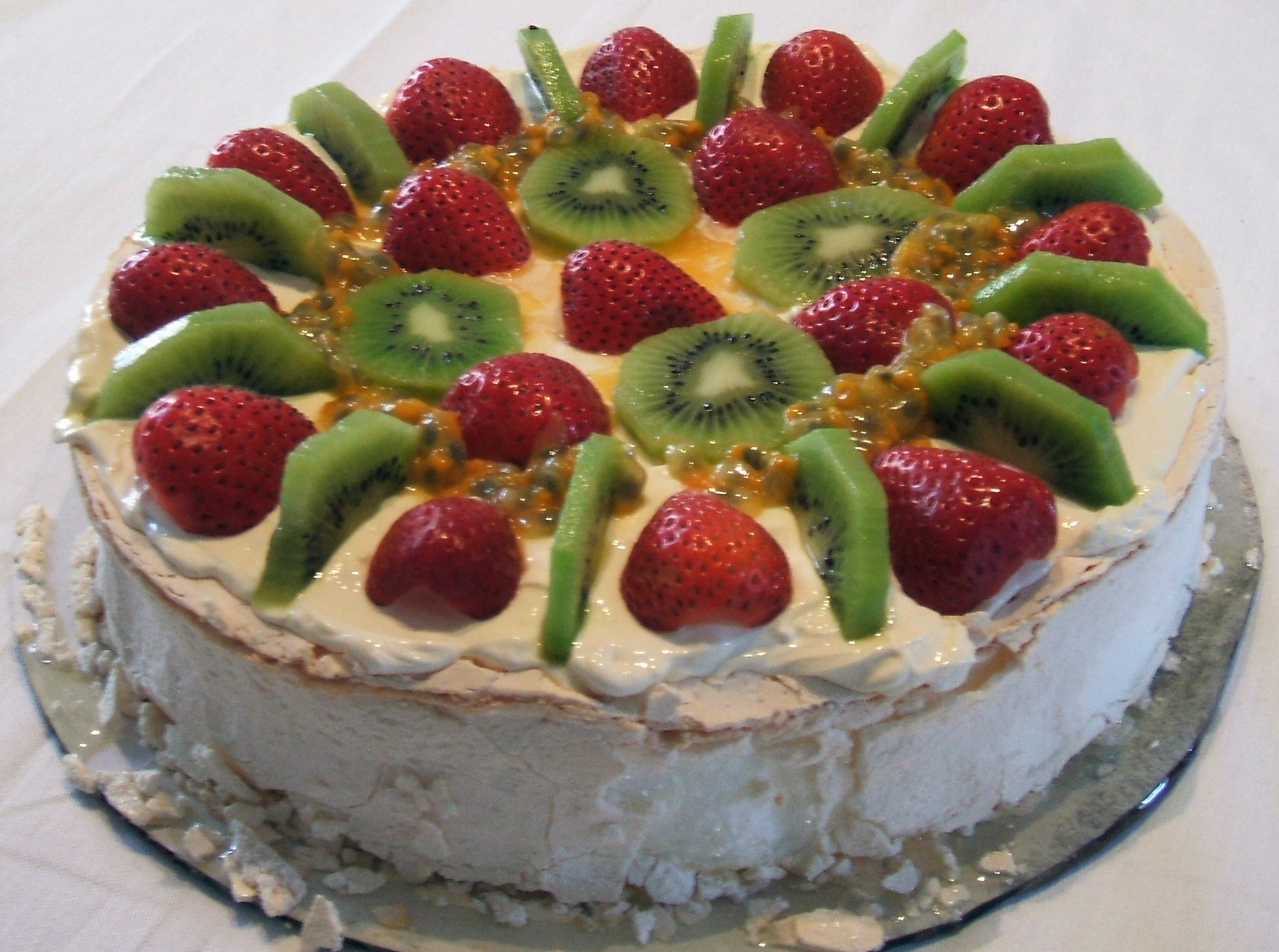
Pavlova

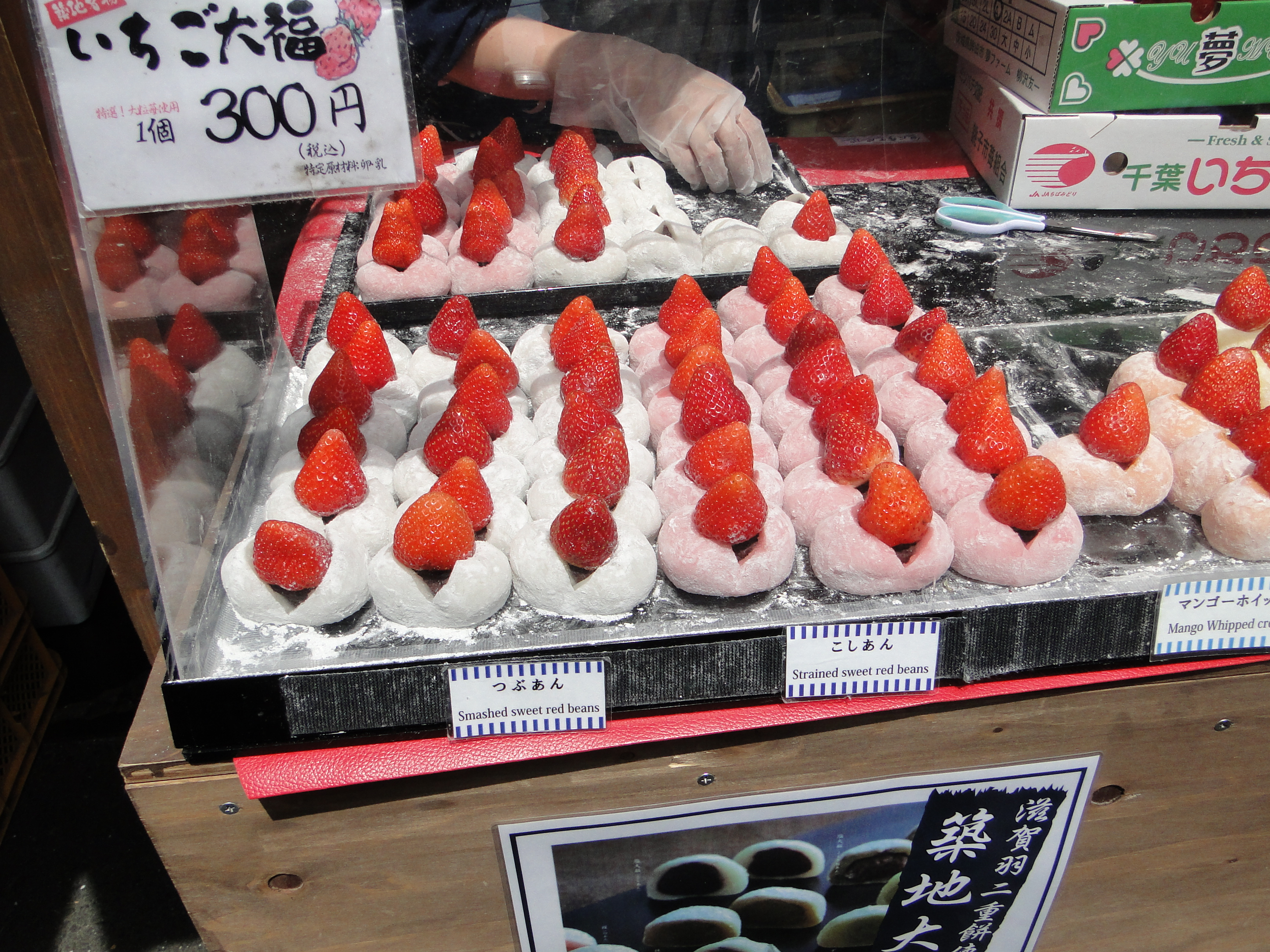
Daifuku

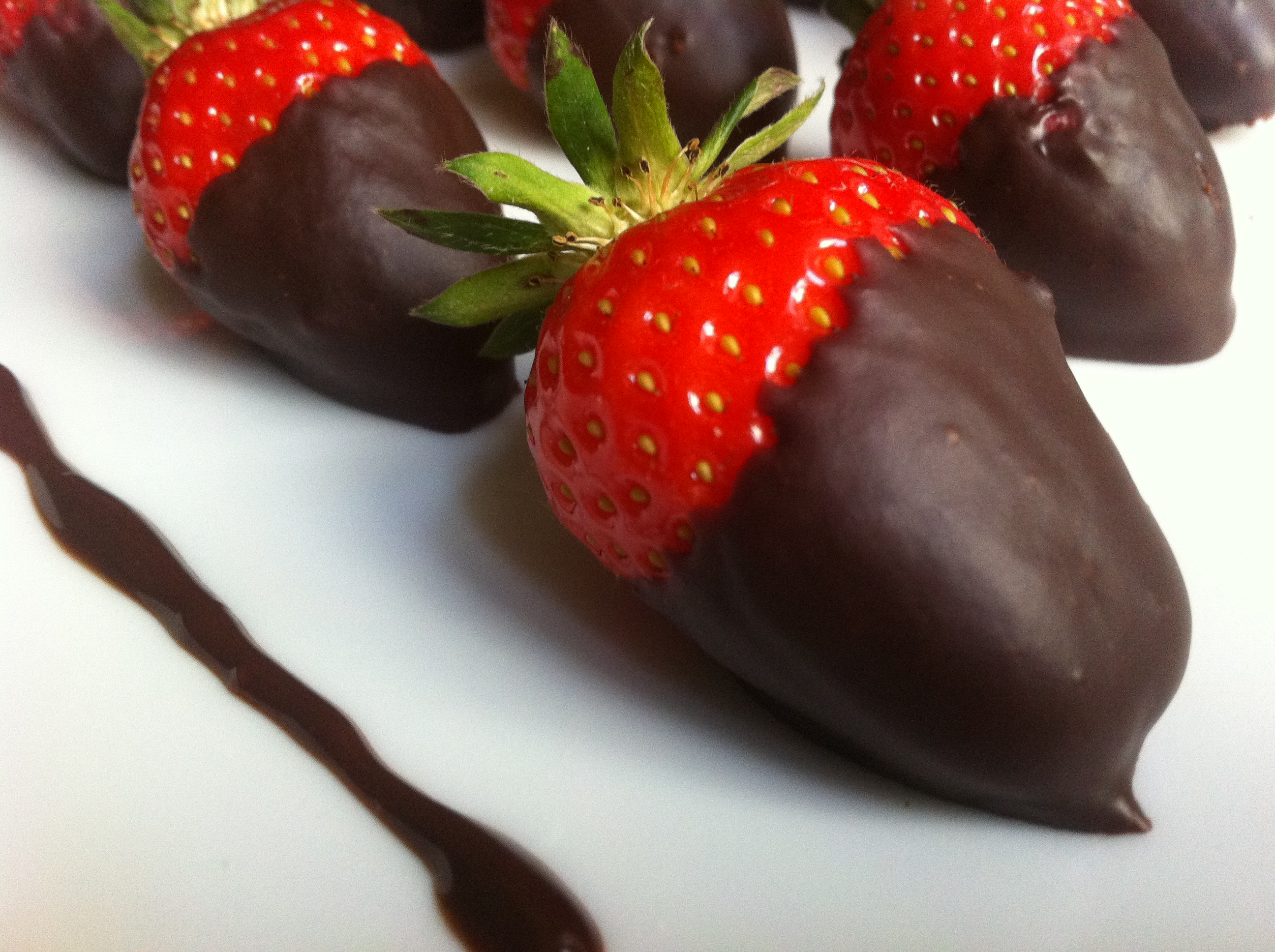
Chocolate-covered

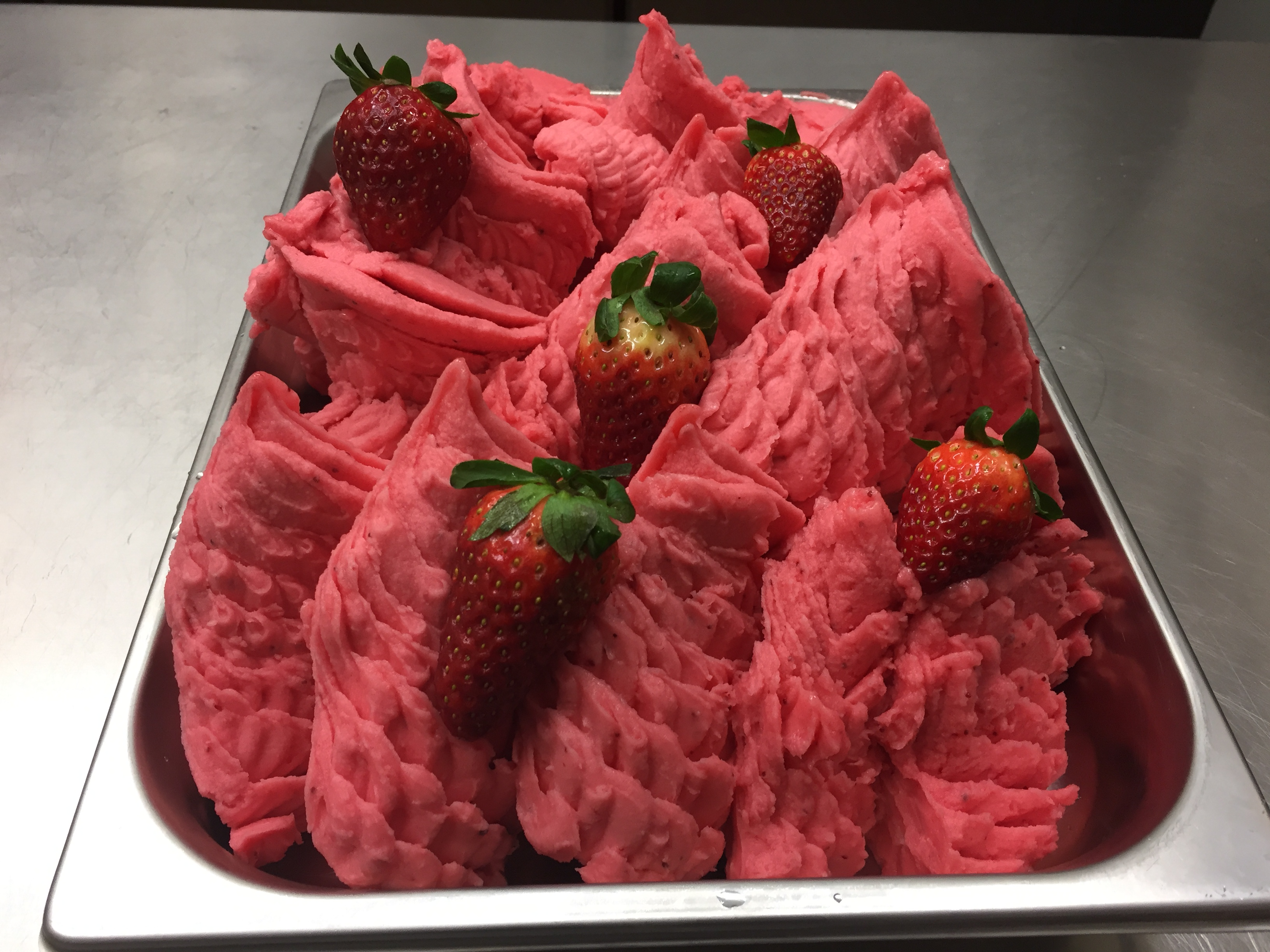
Sorbet

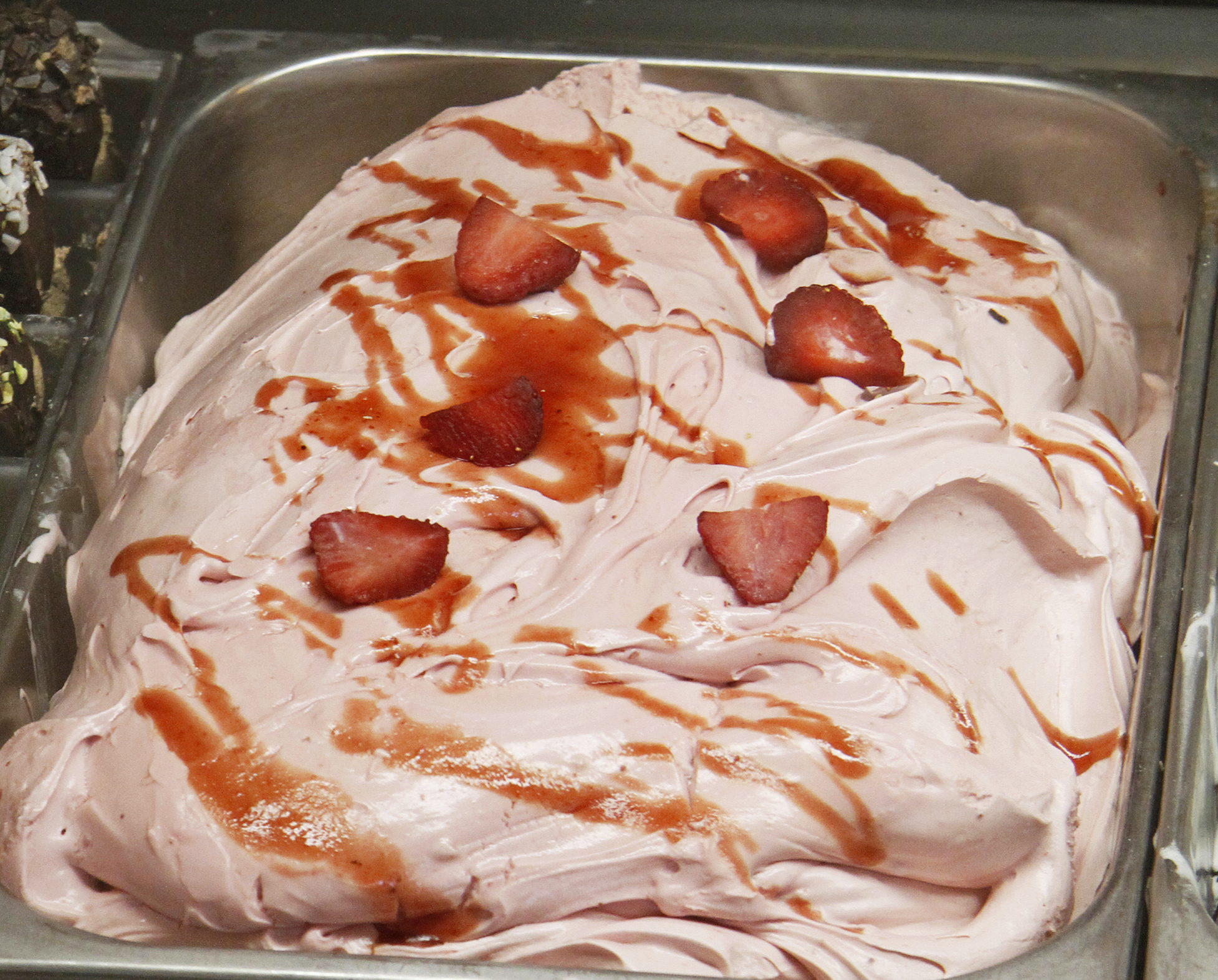
Ice cream

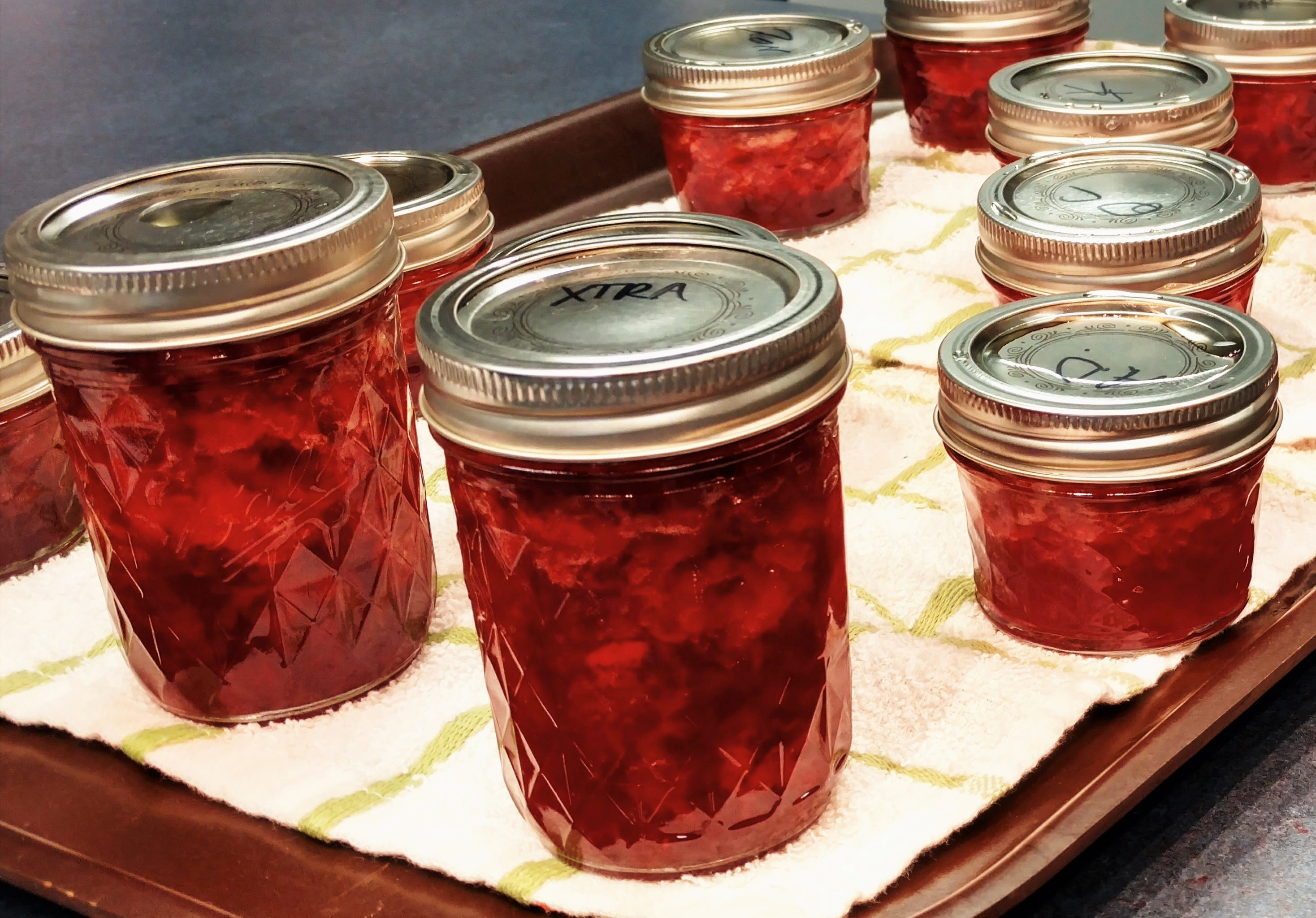
Jam

== In art, literature and culture ==
The Roman poet Ovid wrote that in the past Golden Age, people had lived on wild fruits such as mountain strawberries. (Note: The garden strawberry arose by hybridisation in the eighteenth century, so classical and medieval mentions of the fruit refer to wild strawberries.) Virgil wrote in his Eclogues that "Ye who cull flowers and low-growing strawberries, / Away from here lads; a chill snake lurks in the grass", and his imagery was taken up by medieval and early modern writers, the snake beneath the strawberry standing for dangerous literature, or beautiful but unfaithful women, or eventually any risky pleasure. In this vein, Shakespeare's King Richard III asks for a dish of strawberries while feigning friendship to his enemy; while in Othello, Iago shows Desdemona's handkerchief "spotted with strawberries", implying she has been unfaithful and hinting at Iago's own devious plans.

The wild strawberry is found in Italian, Flemish, and German art, and in English miniatures. In medieval depictions, the strawberry often appears in the Virgin Mary's garden, while in the Madonna of the Strawberries, she is seated on a strawberry bed and garlanded with strawberry leaves.

In the work of the late medieval painter Hieronymus Bosch, strawberries feature in The Garden of Earthly Delights amongst "frolicking nude figures". Fray Jose de Siguenza described the painting as embodying the strawberry as a symbol of the ephemerality of earthly joys. More recently, scholars have seen the symbolism entirely differently: Clément Wertheim-Aymes believed it meant the blessed souls' benefit from religion; Pater Gerlach supposed it meant spiritual love; and Laurinda Dixon asserted it was part of an allegory of death and resurrection. By the late 20th century, the strawberry (and the raspberry) had become "traditional symbols of the mouth and female sexuality".

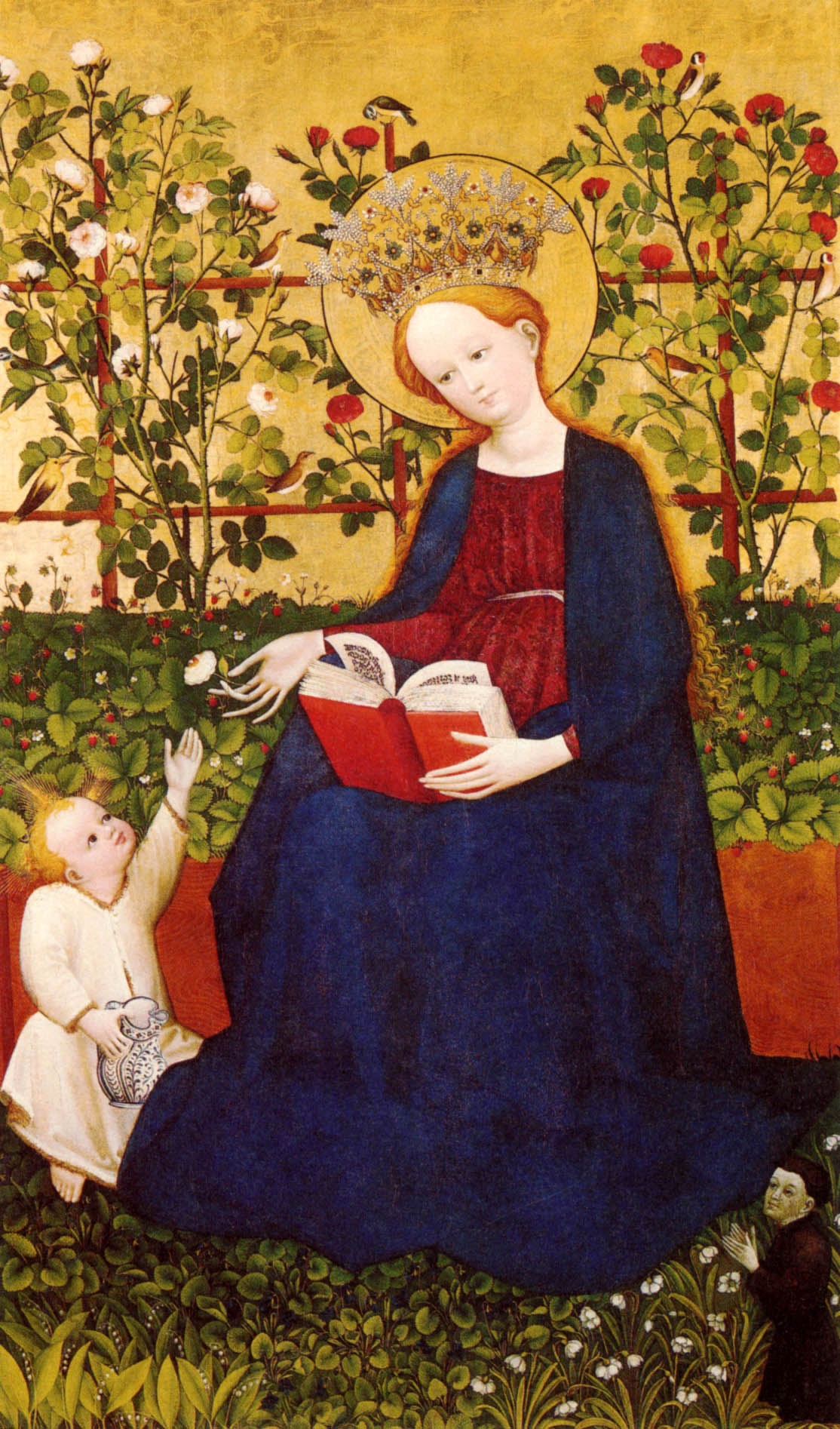
Madonna of the Strawberries,
the Upper Rhenish Master, 1420–1430

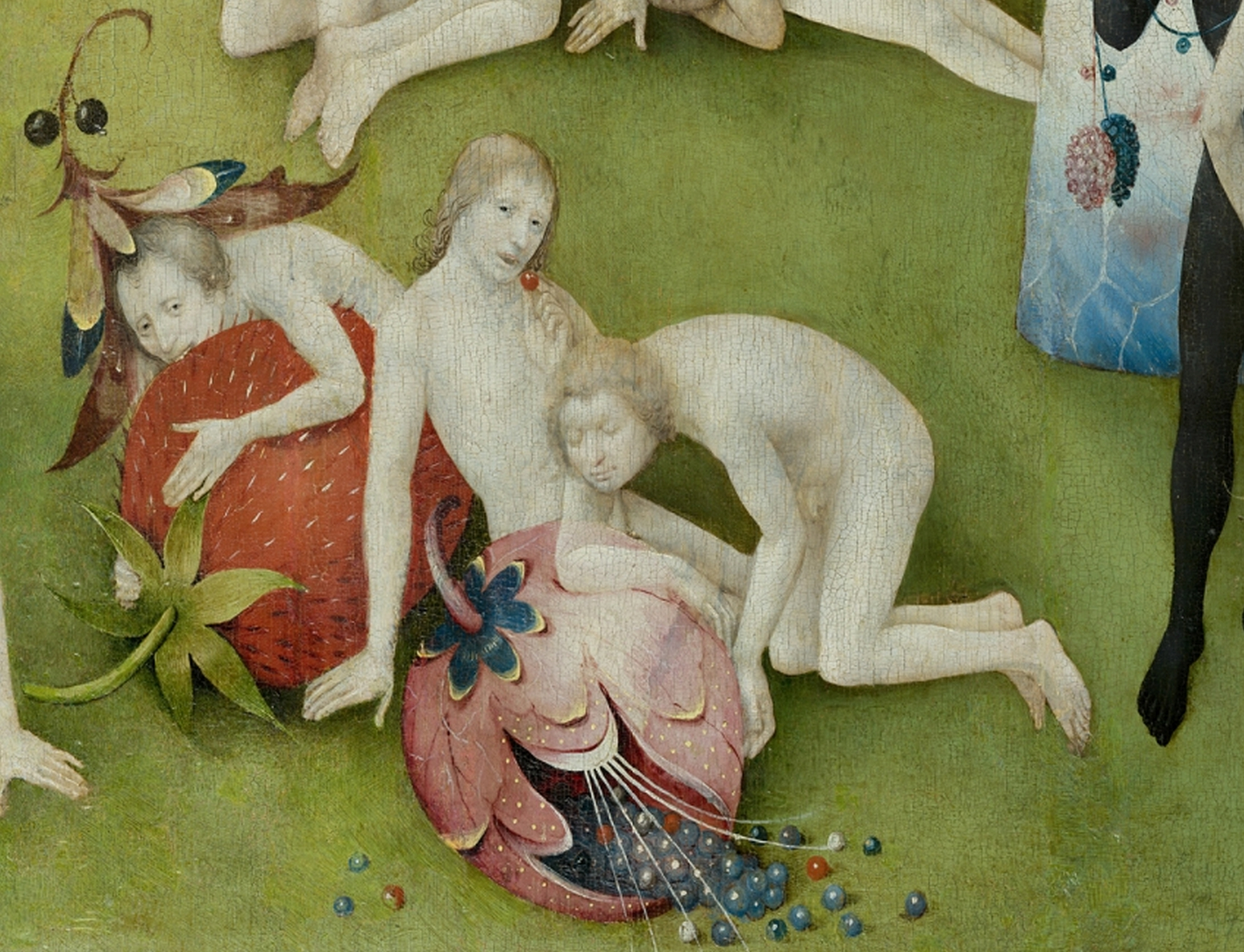
The Garden of Earthly Delights, man eating a strawberry (detail),
Hieronymus Bosch, 1490–1500

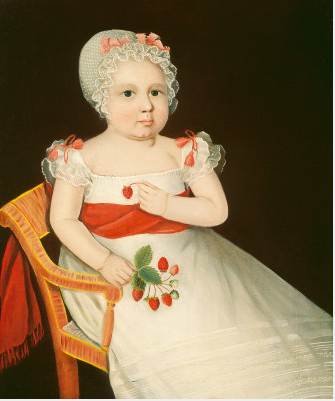
The strawberry girl,
Ammi Phillips, c. 1830

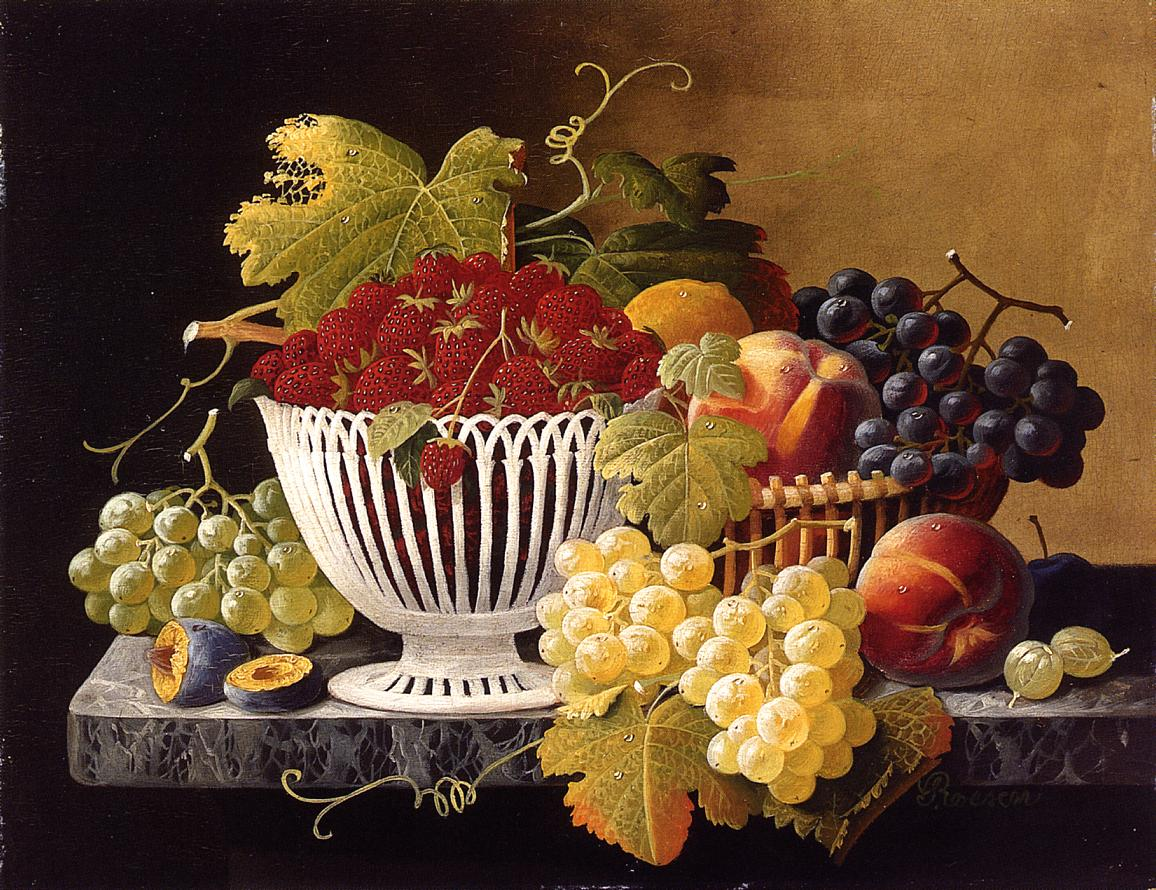
Still Life with Strawberry Basket,
Severin Roesen, 1860–1871

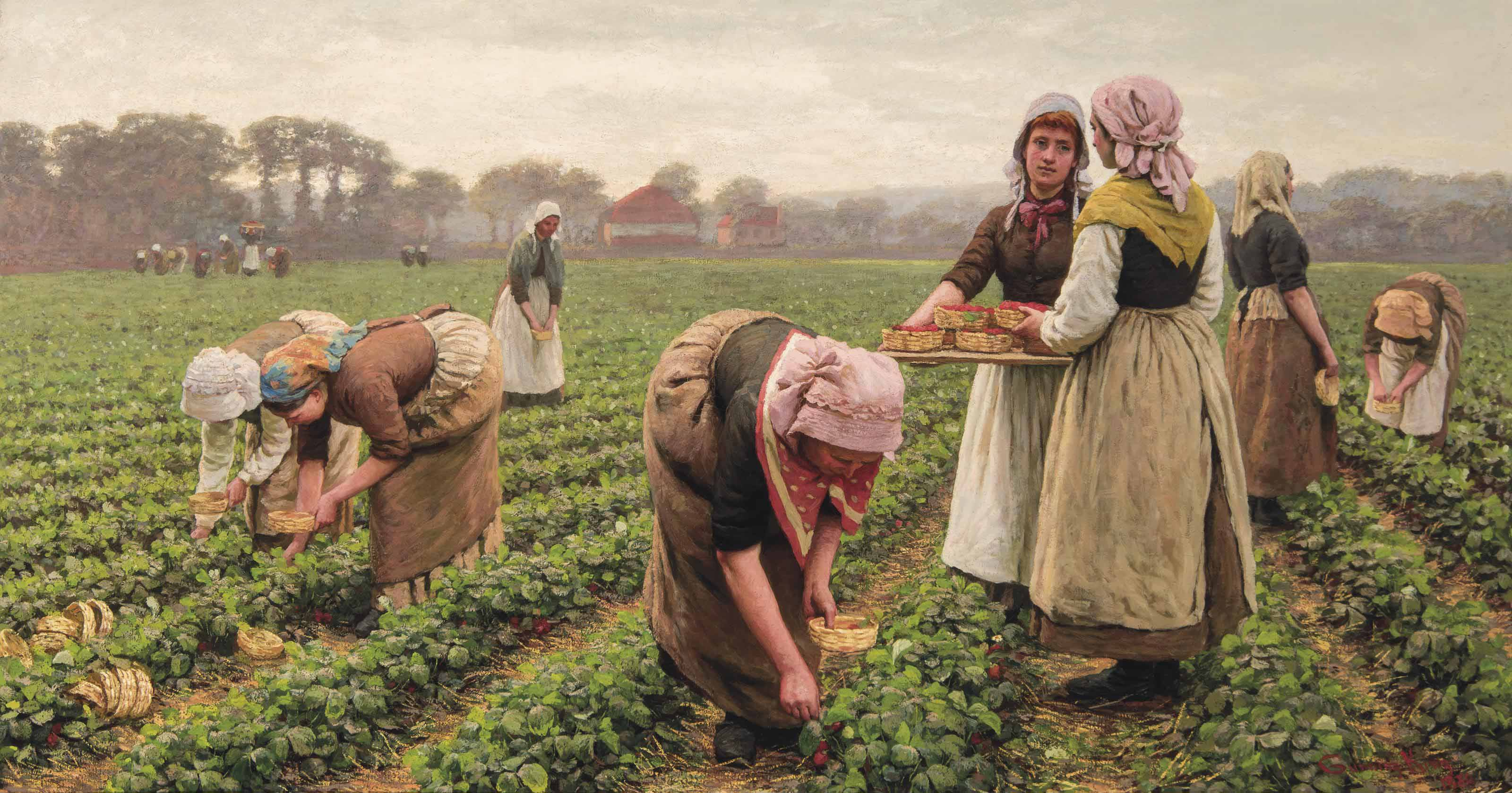
Strawberry Gatherers,
William Gunning King, 1880

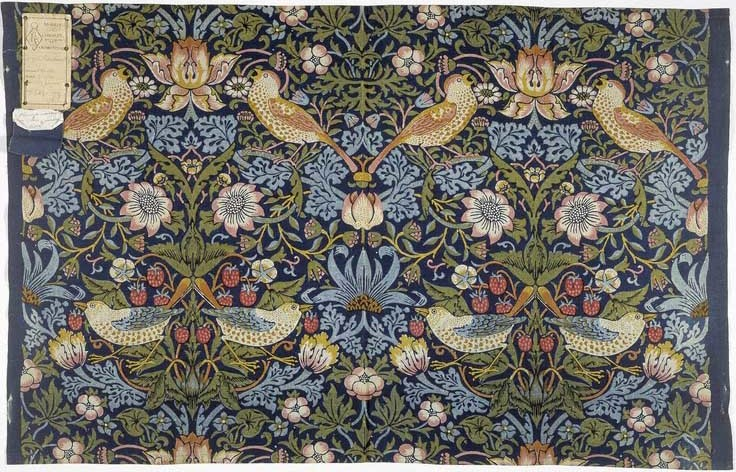
"Strawberry Thief" textile pattern,
William Morris, 1883

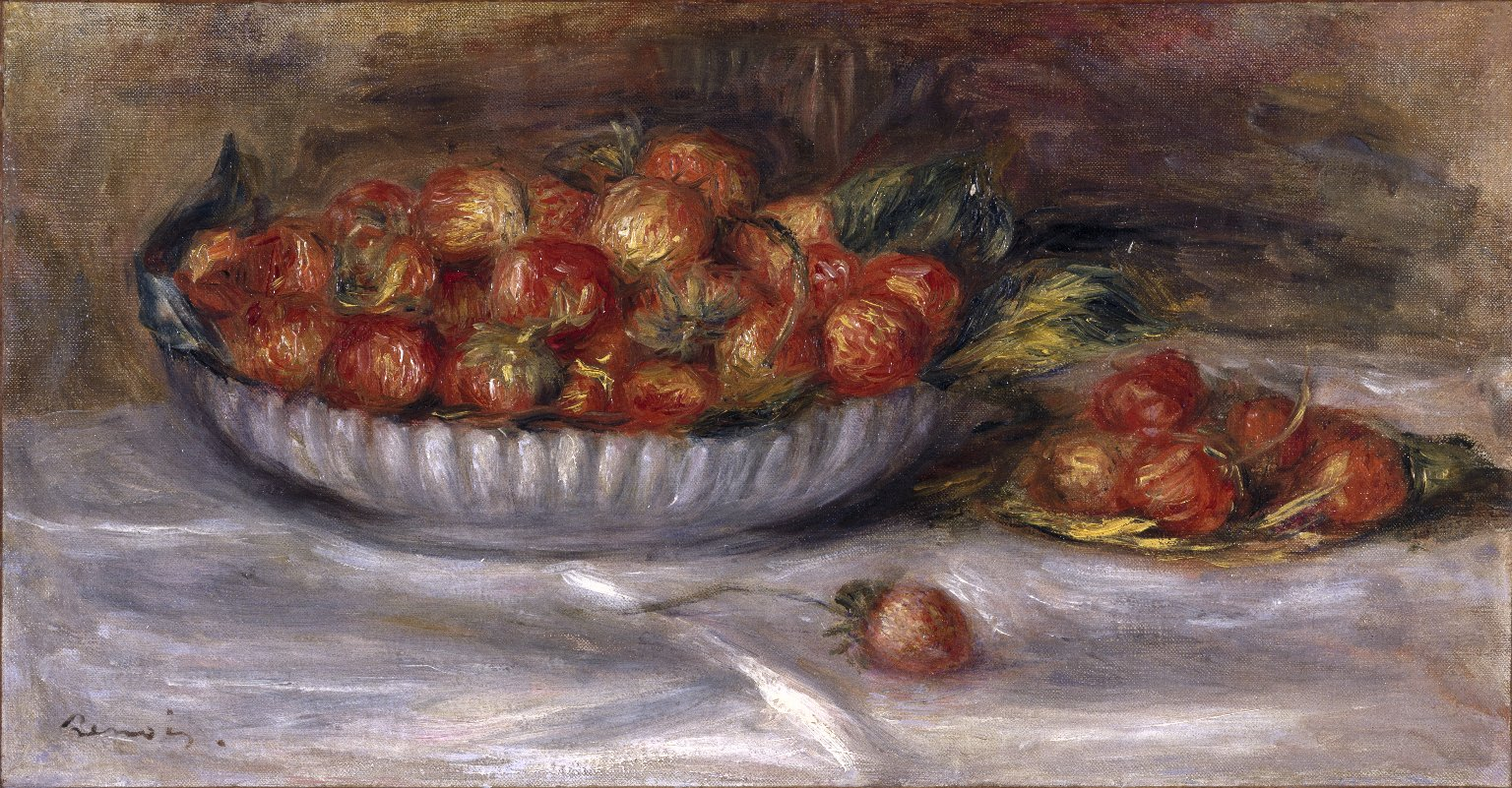
Still Life with Strawberries,
Pierre-Auguste Renoir, 1914

== See also ==
- Outline of strawberries
- California Strawberry Commission
- List of culinary fruits
- List of strawberry dishes
- Musk strawberry (hautbois strawberry)
- Plant City, Florida (winter strawberry capital of the world)
- Pineberry
- Pomology
- Strawberry generation
