= Chaetosiphon fragaefolii =

Scientific classification
- Domain: Eukaryota
- Kingdom: Animalia
- Phylum: Arthropoda
- Class: Insecta
- Order: Hemiptera
- Suborder: Sternorrhyncha
- Family: Aphididae
- Genus: Chaetosiphon
- Species: C. fragaefolii

Binomial name
- Chaetosiphon fragaefolii (Cockerell, 1901)

Synonyms
- Myzus fragaefolii Cockerell, 1901; Myzus fragaefolii; Myzus fragariae Theobald, 1912; Capitophorus fragaefolii (Cockerell, T.D.A., 1901); Capitophorus fragariae; Chaetosiphon (Pentatrichopus) fragariae; Myzus fragaefolii Cockerell, T.D.A., 1901; Passerinia fragaefolii (Cockerell, T.D.A., 1901)

Species of true bug

Chaetosiphon fragaefolii, the strawberry aphid, is a bug species in the genus Chaetosiphon found in the United States (Arizona), Argentina and Chile.

Chaetosiphon fragaefolii, along with C. thomasi and C. jacobi, is a vector of the strawberry mild yellow-edge virus.
