= Strawberry mild yellow-edge virus =

Virus classification
- (unranked): Virus
- Realm: Riboviria
- Kingdom: Orthornavirae
- Phylum: Kitrinoviricota
- Class: Alsuviricetes
- Order: Tymovirales
- Family: Alphaflexiviridae
- Genus: Potexvirus
- Species: Potexvirus fragariae

Species of virus

Strawberry mild yellow-edge virus (SMYEV) is a pathogenic plant virus in the family Alphaflexiviridae, genus Potexvirus. It is a common virus that infects strawberries globally and can cause up to a 30% loss in yield. Symptoms of infection in strawberries include dwarfing, marginal chlorosis, leaf distortion, and small fruit size. SMYEV is transmitted by strawberry aphids of the genus Chaetosiphon. It is an RNA virus, with a positive-sense, single-stranded RNA genome about 6 kilobases in length.

== See also ==
- List of strawberry diseases
