= Illa Martin =

German dendrologist

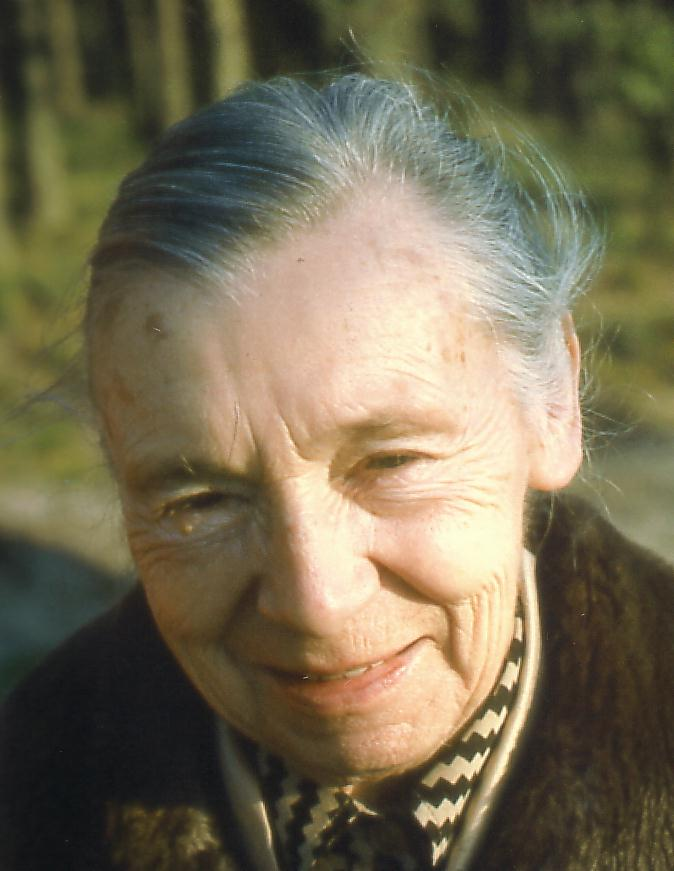
- Illa Martin in 1986
- Born: Sybilla Kesselburg; 25 February 1900; Viersen, Germany
- Died: 6 August 1988 (aged 88); Viersen, Germany
- Other names: Sybilla Kesselburg
- Spouse: Ernst J. Martin
- Children: Erik Martin, Helge Breloer

Illa Martin (born Sybilla Kesselburg; 25 February 1900 – 6 August 1988) was a German dendrologist, botanist, conservationist and dentist.

== Life ==
Illa Martin was the daughter of a brewery owner in Viersen. She studied dentistry in Bonn, Würzburg and Freiburg and in 1935 married the dentist Ernst J. Martin, with whom she shared a practice in Kaldenkirchen.

She left home already having botanical knowledge and interests. Both she and her husband started to pursue their passion for dendrology during the Second World War. In 1947, her husband initiated the reforestation of the Kaldenkirchener forest boundary.

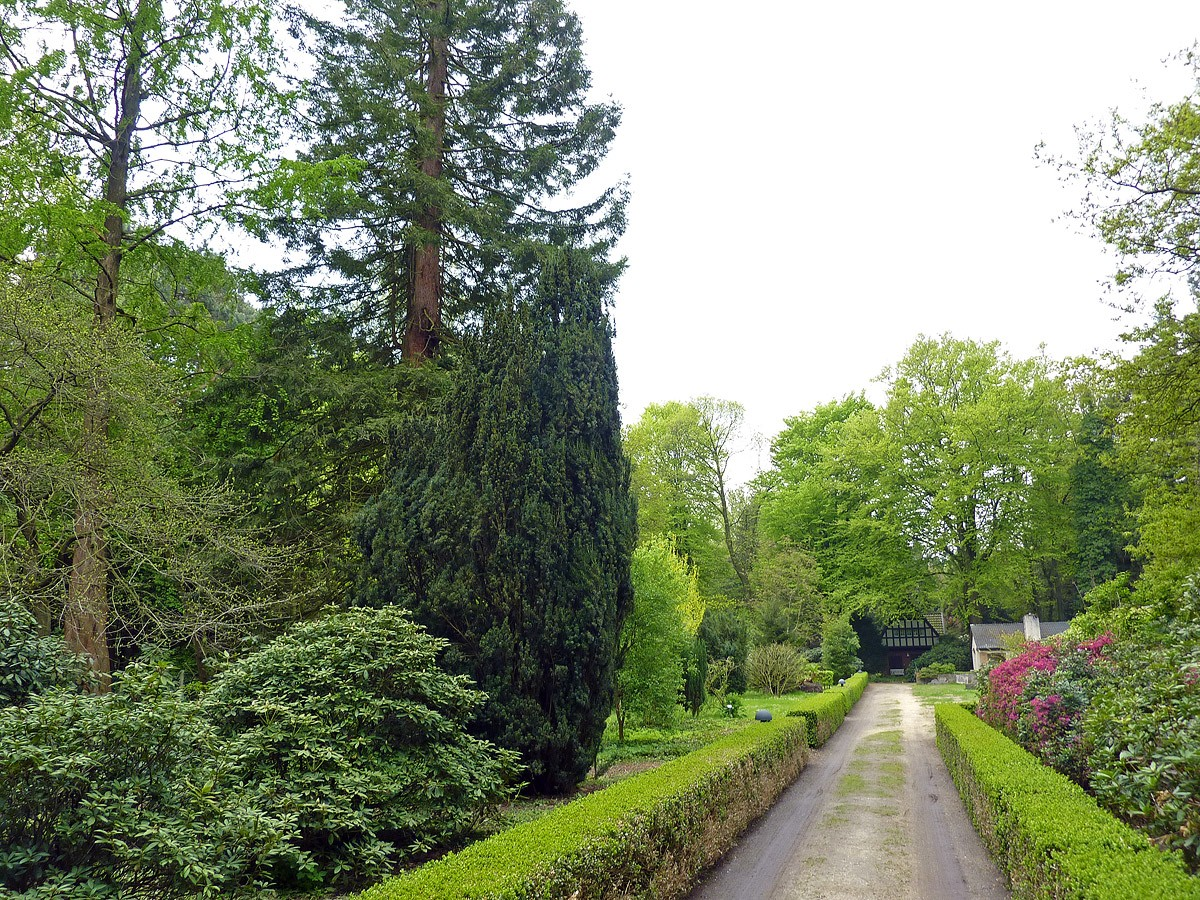
Entrance to the Sequoia Farm

In 1951, the couple founded the sequoia farm Sequoiafarm Kaldenkirchen using Sequoiadendron giganteum seeds sent from the USA. In 1953, with support from the German Research Foundation 1500 two years copies of the Giant Sequoia tree next to coastal redwoods maintained Sequoia sempervirens and other species. A research objective was to examine the possibilities for the introduction of these trees in the German forestry. Illa Martin tried to make the forest floor a correspondingly diverse area of flora, containing for example, the American wild ginger Asarum caudatum. Today, the Sequoia Farm is a famous arboretum with over 600 tree species and contains the 1953 scale Sequoia sempervirens grove next to the Sequoia sempervirens deposits in national forest timber castle one of the very few larger coastal redwood holdings north of the Alps.

After her husband's death in 1967, Illa Martin saw that economic continuation of the Sequoia Farm was impossible and so sold the site in late 1969 with buildings at the College of Education Rhineland (now the University of Cologne). Now the site is owned by the Nettetal city works. She devoted herself entirely to dendrologic research, wrote three basic tree monographs and reported in many areas of nature conservation. She was a member of the German Dendrological Society, led courses on the Sequoia grove farm, and for many years was a permanent member of the council of the International Dendrology Society (London).

As a botanist of Lower Rhine flora, Illa Martin discovered Sleeping moss (Hypnum imponens) which occurs only in the shifting sand dunes of the German-Dutch border area in the Lower Rhine Gold in the moorlands, which were in 1986 declared a nature reserve. A discovered form of native wild strawberry with white fruit is listed as Fragaria vesca 'Illa Martin'. In 1983 the city Nettetal named a walking trail in the Kaldenkirchen forest after the couple, "Dr. Martin Weg".

The couple had two sons and a daughter, including the author and songwriter Erik Martin and the legal expert Helge Breloer.

== Writings ==
In addition to numerous journal articles Illa Martin published three extensive monographs:

- Propagation and cultivation of Nothofagus in Germany. In: Volume 70 pp. 147–166. Ulmer. Stuttgart 1978, ISBN 3-8001-8302-1
- The reintroduction of the sequoia (Sequoiadendron giganteum) in the German forestry. In: Volume 75 pp. 57–75. Ulmer. Stuttgart 1984, ISBN 3-8001-8308-0
- The coast redwood (Sequoia sempervirens) and its cultivation in Germany. In: Volume 77 pp. 57–104. Ulmer. Stuttgart 1987, ISBN 3-8001-8310-2

== Awards ==
- 1980 Albert Steeger badge
- 1981 Federal Cross of Merit
- 1981 Jubilee Medal (Horst Koehler Memorial Prize) of the German Horticultural Society

== Literature ==
- Horst Bartels: Dr. Illa Martin. In: Mitteilungen der Dendrologischen Gesellschaft. Vol 72, Ulm, Stuttgart 1981, ISBN 3-8001-8305-6
- Arthur Lange: Wissenschaft als Steckenpferd. Laienforscher – ihre Leistungen und ihre Wissenschaft. Holsten. Hamburg 1967
- Herbert Hubatsch: Von der Sequoiafarm zur Biologischen Station. In: Heimatbuch des Kreises Kempen-Krefeld. Kempen-Krefeld. Kempen 1973
- Hans Huth: Sequoias in Germany. In: Journal of Forest History, Volume 3 July, in 1976. Durham (USA), ISSN 0094-5080
- HW Schmitz: Dr. Illa Martin verstorben. In: Der Niederrhein. Krefeld, No. 4 1988
- "Anwältin der Natur". Dr. Illa Martin starb in Viersen. In: Grenzland-Nachrichten 11 August 1988
