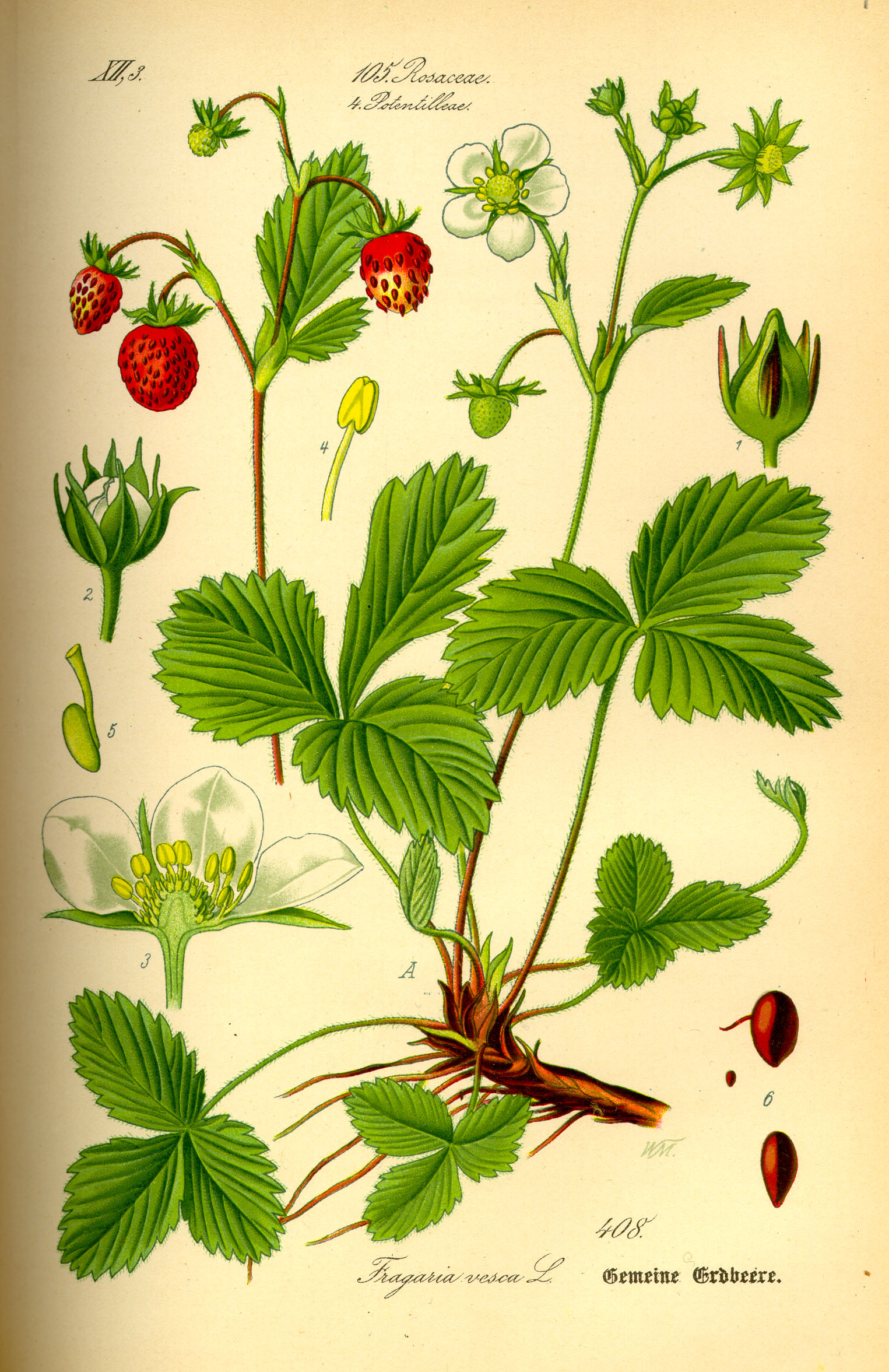

Scientific classification
- Kingdom: Plantae
- Clade: Embryophytes
- Clade: Tracheophytes
- Clade: Angiosperms
- Clade: Eudicots
- Clade: Rosids
- Order: Rosales
- Family: Rosaceae
- Genus: Fragaria
- Species: F. vesca

Binomial name
- Fragaria vesca L.

= Fragaria vesca =

Species of strawberry

Fragaria vesca, commonly called the woodland strawberry, Alpine strawberry, wild strawberry, Carpathian strawberry or European strawberry, is a perennial herbaceous plant in the rose family that grows naturally throughout much of the Northern Hemisphere, and that produces edible fruits.

The Latin specific epithet vesca literally means "thin" or "feeble", but likely carries the sense "edible" in this context (compare vescor, "to eat").

== Description ==
Five to eleven soft, hairy white flowers are borne on a green, soft fresh-hairy 3–15 centimetres (1–6 in) stalk that usually lifts them above the leaves. The light-green leaves are trifoliate (in threes) with toothed margins. The plant spreads mostly by means of runners (stolons), but the seeds are viable and establish new populations.

Its fruit persists for an average of 1.2 days, which is possibly the shortest persistence of any fleshy fruit in Europe. It bears an average of 46.8 seeds per fruit, which is possibly the highest per fruit of any in Europe. Fruits average 84.0% water, and their dry weight includes 21.0% carbohydrates and 5.5% lipids, one of the higher lipid values among European fleshy fruits.

== Taxonomy ==
Vilmorin-Andrieux (1885) makes a distinction between wild or wood strawberries (Fragaria vesca) and alpine strawberries (Fragaria alpina), a distinction which is not made by most seed companies or nurseries, which usually sell Fragaria vesca as "alpine strawberry".

Under wild or wood strawberry, Vilmorin says:

It has seldom been seen in gardens since the introduction of the Red Alpine Strawberry. ... Wood Strawberry possesses a quite particular perfume and delicacy of flavour. 2,500 seeds to the gramme.

Under alpine strawberry, Vilmorin says:

A very different plant to the Wood Strawberry, and distinguished by the greater size of all its parts — the fruit in particular — and especially by the property (which is particular to it) of producing flowers and fruit continuously all through the summer. ... The fruit has nearly the same appearance and flavour as that of the Wood Strawberry, but is generally larger, longer, and more pointed in shape. The seed is also perceptibly larger and longer. A gramme contains only about 1,500 seeds.

=== Subspecies ===
As of November 2020, Plants of the World Online accepts two subspecies in addition to the autonym, Fragaria vesca subsp. vesca:

- Fragaria vesca subsp. americana (Porter) Staudt
- Fragaria vesca subsp. bracteata (A.Heller) Staudt

== Ecology ==
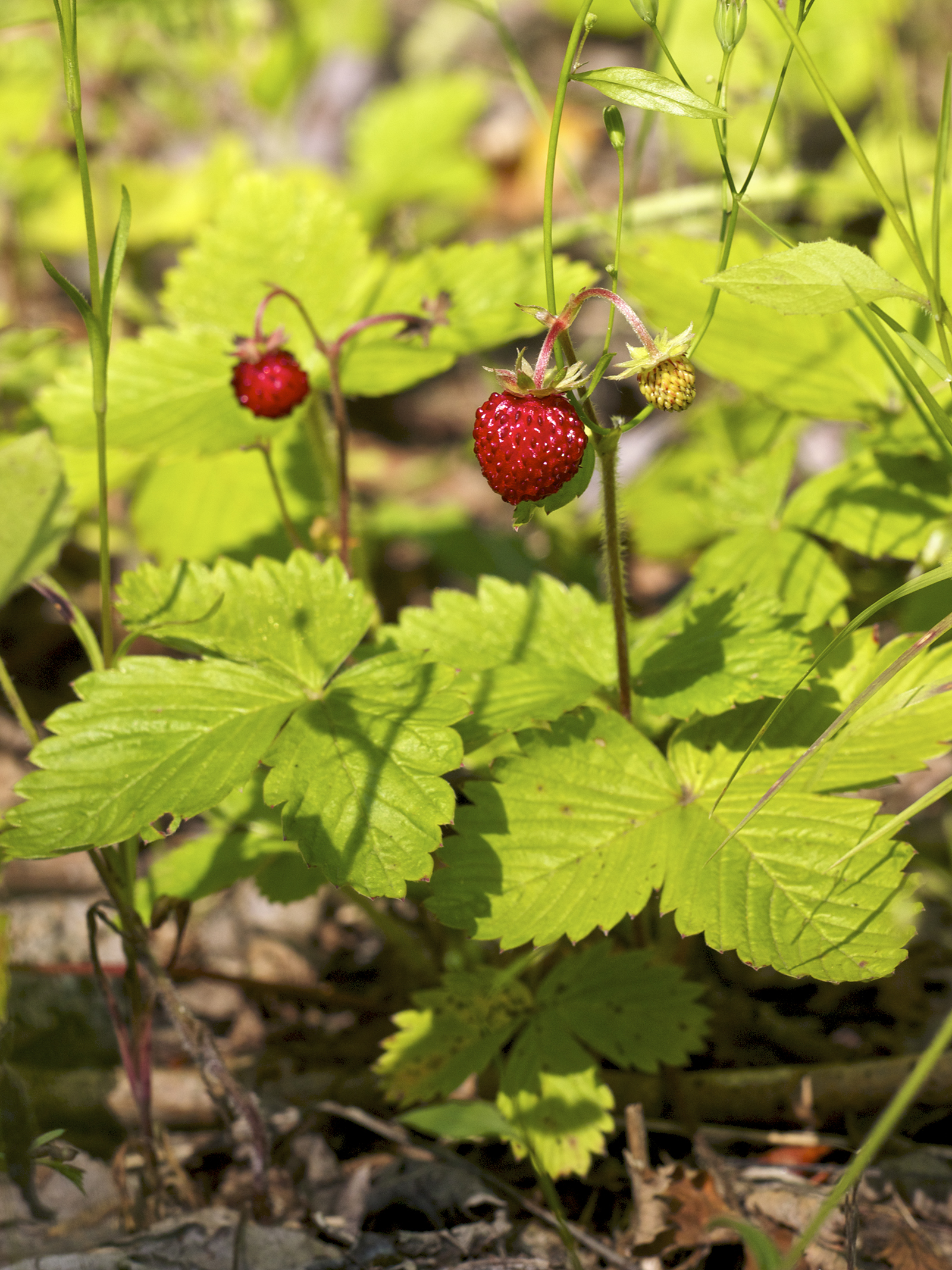
Fragaria vesca, fruiting plant

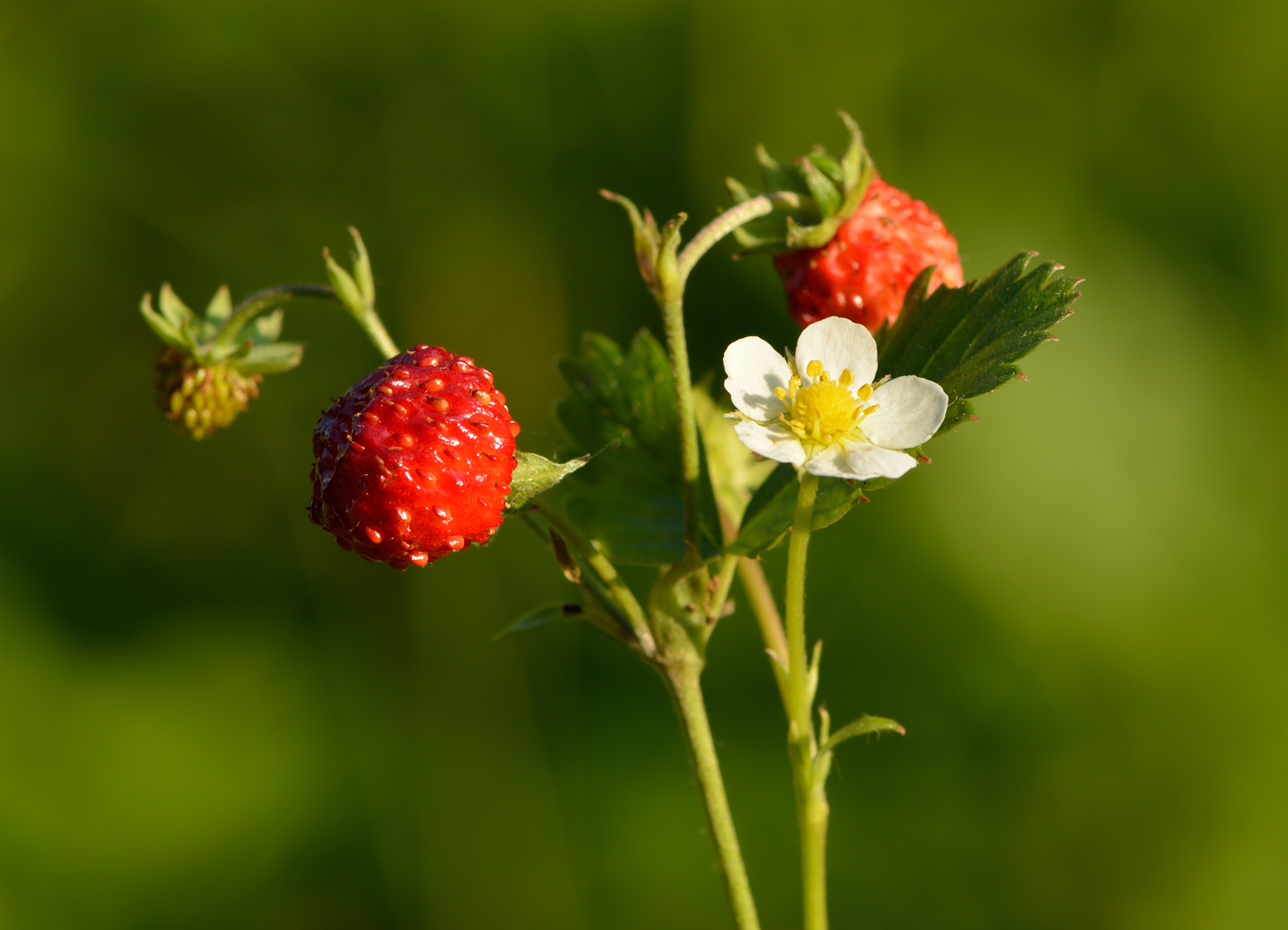
Wild strawberry in Estonia, Pakri Peninsula

Typical habitat is along trails and roadsides, embankments, hillsides, stone- and gravel-laid paths and roads, meadows, young woodlands, sparse forest, woodland edges, and clearings. Often plants can be found where they do not get sufficient light to form fruit. In the southern part of its range, it can grow only in shady areas; further north it tolerates more sun. It is tolerant of a variety of moisture levels (except very wet or dry conditions). It can survive mild fires and/or establish itself after fires.

Although F. vesca primarily propagates via runners, viable seeds are also found in soil seed banks and seem to germinate when the soil is disturbed (away from existing populations of F. vesca).

Its leaves serve as significant food source for a variety of ungulates, such as mule deer and elk, and the fruit are eaten by a variety of mammals and birds that also help to distribute the seeds in their droppings.

It is a larval host to the two-banded checkered skipper.

== Genomics ==
Genomic information
- NCBI ID: 57918
- Ploidy: diploid
- Number of chromosomes: 14
- Year of completion: 2010

The wild strawberry is used as an indicator plant for diseases that affect the garden strawberry. It is also used as a genetic model plant for garden strawberry and the family Rosaceae in general, due to its:

- very small genome size
- short reproductive cycle (14–15 weeks in climate-controlled greenhouses)
- ease of propagation.

The genome of F. vesca was sequenced in 2010, and with greater detail and accuracy in 2017 by the Knapp UC Davis program.

All strawberry (Fragaria) species have a base haploid count of seven chromosomes; Fragaria vesca is diploid, having two pairs of these chromosomes for a total of 14.

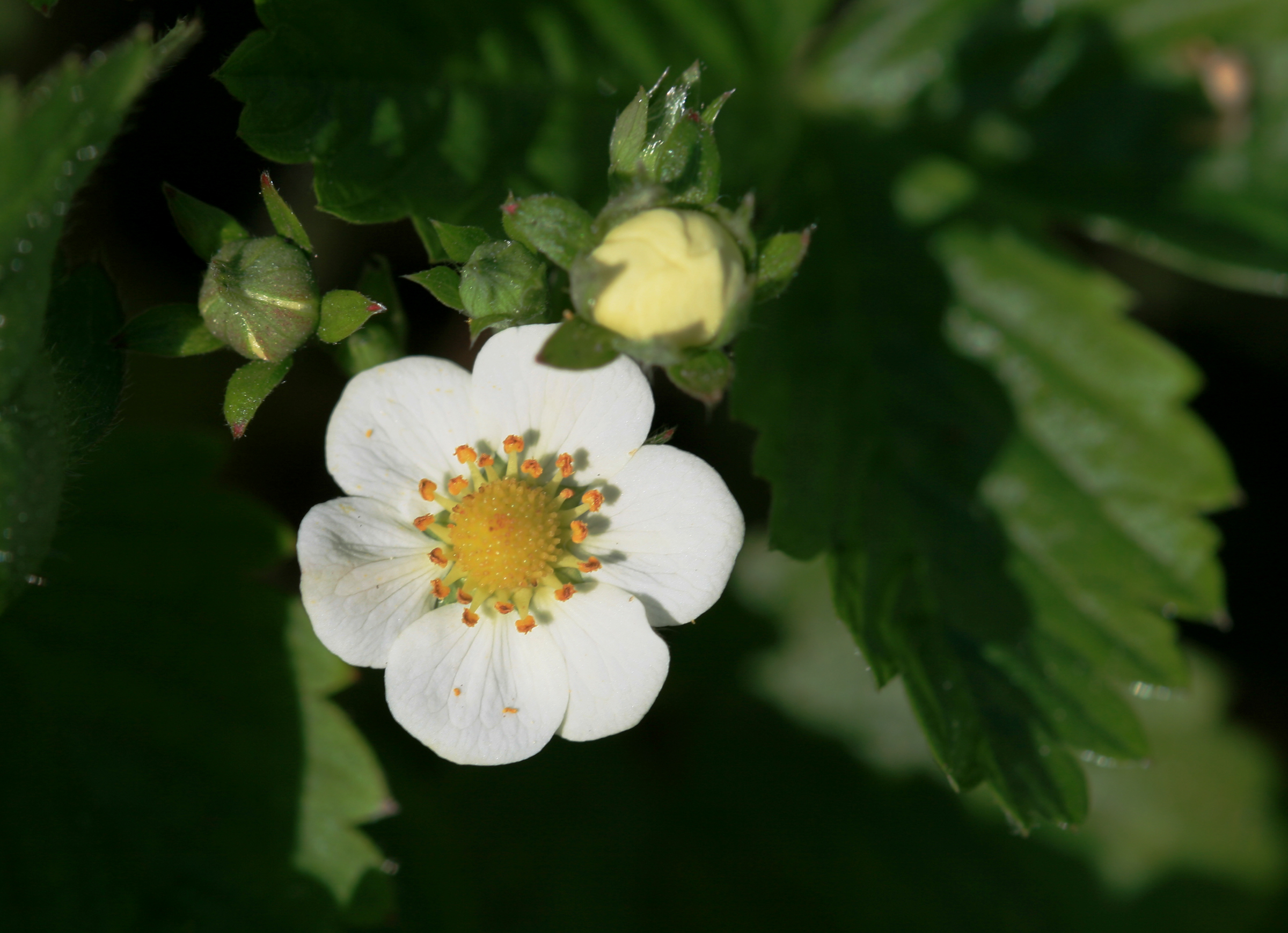
Flower close-up

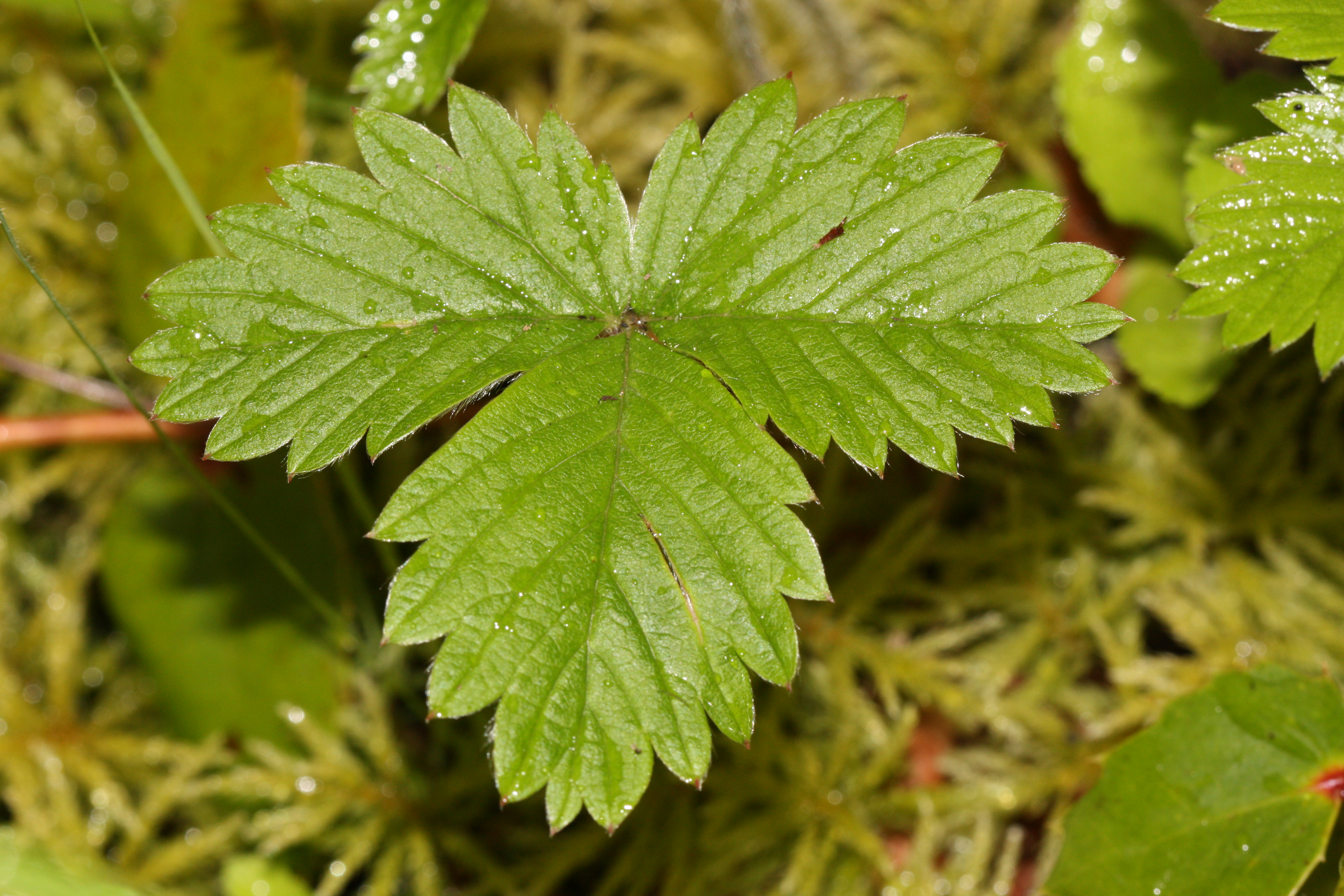
Leaf close-up

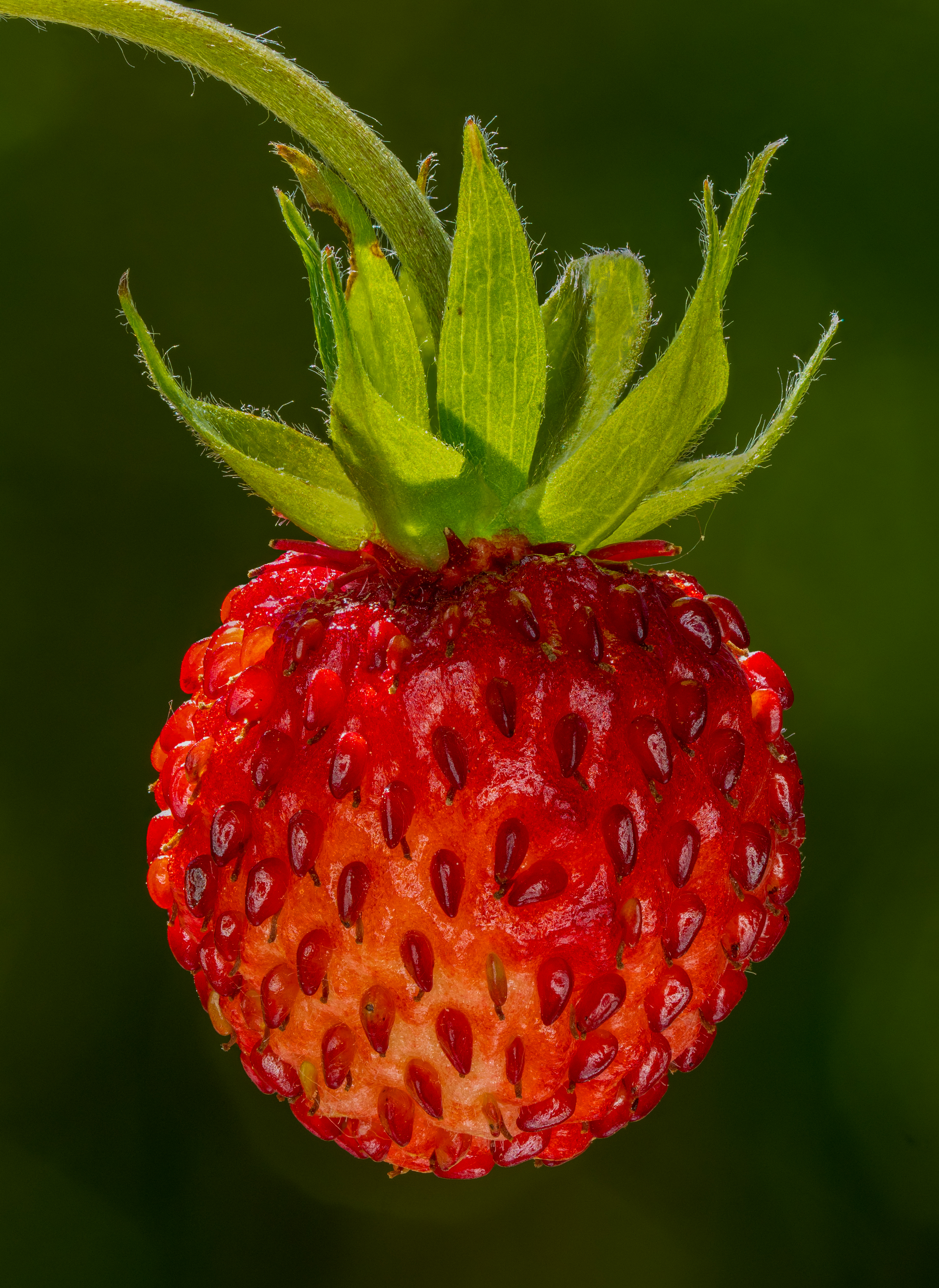
Fruit close-up

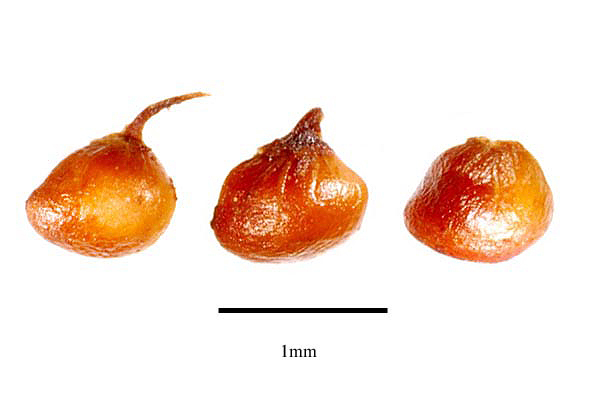
Seeds close-up

== History, cultivation and uses ==
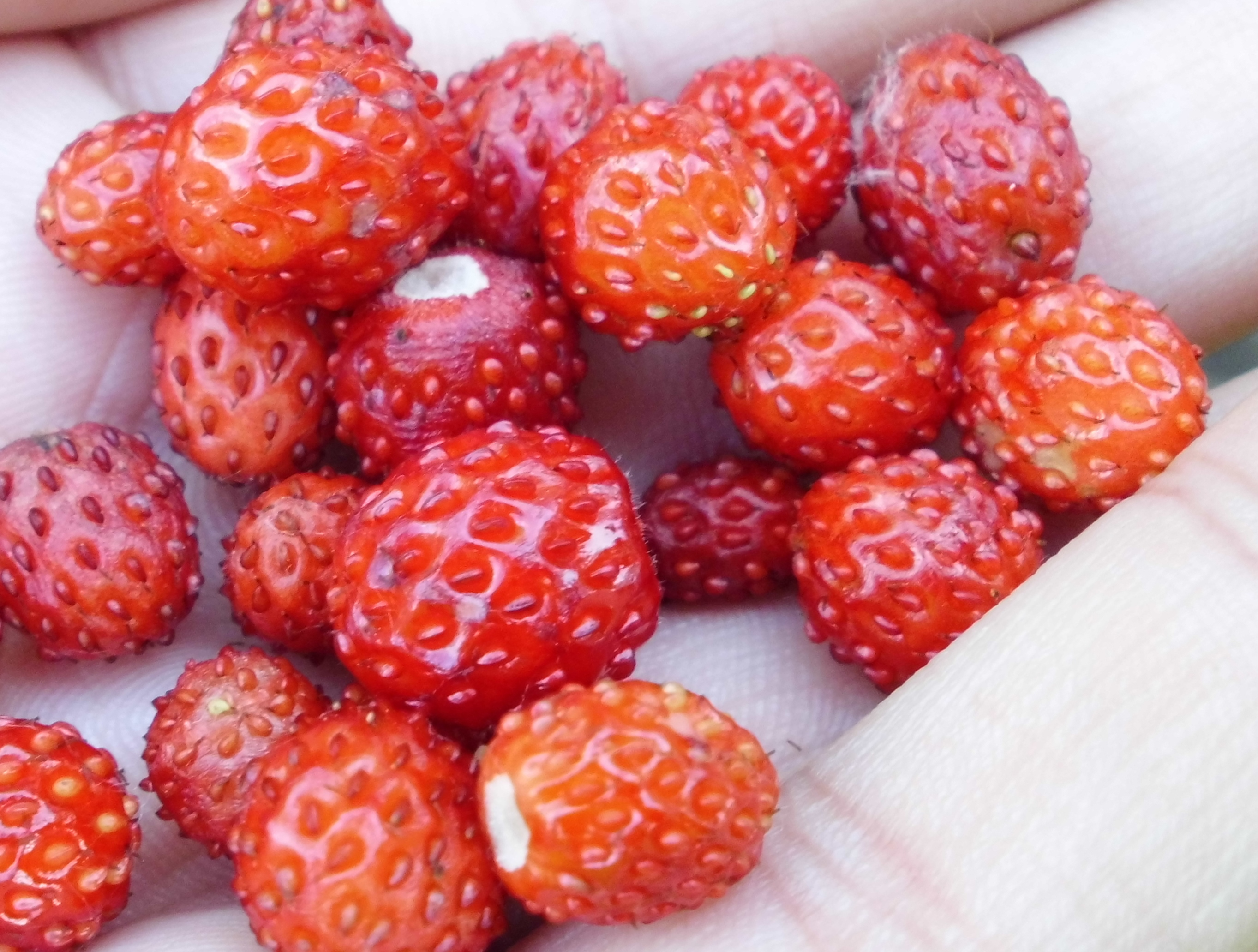
Wild strawberry fruits collected in the forest in the Middle Urals

Evidence from archaeological excavations suggests that Fragaria vesca has been consumed by humans since the Stone Age.

Woodland strawberry fruit is strongly flavored, and is still collected and grown for domestic use and on a small scale commercially for the use of gourmets and as an ingredient for commercial jam, sauces, liqueurs, cosmetics and alternative medicine. In Turkey, hundreds of tons of wild fruit are harvested annually, mainly for export.

Most of the cultivated varieties have a long flowering period (and have been considered by botanists as belonging to Fragaria vesca subsp. vesca 'Semperflorens'). They are usually called alpine strawberries. They either form runners or multiple crowns in a cluster, fruit over a very long period with larger fruit than the common wood strawberry, and are usually propagated by seeds or division of the plants. The type in cultivation is usually everbearing and produces few runners. Plants tend to lose vigour after a few years due to their abundant fruiting and flowering with final decline caused by viral diseases. Large-fruiting forms are known since the 18th century and were called "Fressant" in France. Some cultivars have fruit that are white or yellow when fully ripe, instead of the normal red.

Cultivars that form stolons are often used as groundcover, while cultivars that do not may be used as border plants. Some cultivars are bred for their ornamental value. Hybrids, Fragaria × vescana, have been created from crosses between woodland strawberry and garden strawberry. Hybrids between the woodland strawberry and the European species Fragaria viridis were in cultivation until around 1850, but are now lost.

Alpine strawberry has an undeserved reputation among home gardeners as hard to grow from seed, often with rumors of long and sporadic germination times, cold pre-chilling requirements, etc. In reality, with proper handling of the very small seeds (which can easily be washed away with rough watering), 80% germination rates at 70 °F (21 °C) in 1–2 weeks are easily achievable.

Alpine strawberries are sometimes included as edging plants in herbaceous borders.

=== Garden varieties currently in cultivation ===
Seed-propagated

- Rügen, the first modern cultivar, i.e., runnerless, everbearing and large fruited — originating from Castle Putbus in Germany, first offered 1920 by the strawberry grower Emil Spangenberg from Morsleben.
- Alexandria, first offered 1964 by George W. Park Seed Co., USA
- Baron Solemacher, first offered 1935 by F. C. Heinemann, Germany
- Weisse Solemacher (white fruited) first offered by F. C. Heinemann
- Golden Alexandria (golden foliage).

Cultivars

Forms with runners are still found in old gardens.

- Quarantaine de Prin, France; commercially important before World War I, but now almost extinct; maybe identical to the variety Erigée de Poitou which was still offered around 1960.
- Blanc Amélioré, Great Britain; white-fruited; it is doubtful if the clone in circulation today is identical to the historical variety from around 1900 because of its non-everbearing habit; nevertheless a good variety with rather large, sometimes monstrous fruit of the Fressant type.
- Illa Martin, Germany; sold as an ornamental, white-fruited. Red achenes have been reported but have not been found. Most plants in circulation not true to name.
- Gartenfreude, Germany; large-fruited form, sometimes very large monstrous fruit of the Fressant type.

Curious mutations have arisen and are sometimes grown by plantsmen and other connoisseurs of the unusual:

- Monophylla (“Strawberry of Versailles”; has one large leaflet instead of the normal three leaflets) - Vilmorin-Andrieux (1885) stated as being raised by Duchesne.
- Multiplex (double flowered; sets less and smaller fruit)
- Muricata (“Plymouth strawberry”; the flowers are composed of numerous small, leafy bracts; the fruit are similarly spiky).

== Chemistry ==
F. vesca contains the ellagitannin agrimoniin which is an isomer of sanguiin H-6.

== See also ==
- Musk strawberry
- Strawberry
- Creamy strawberry (or green strawberry)

== Bibliography ==
- Ehrlén, Johan; Eriksson, Ove (1991). "Phenological variation in fruit characteristics in vertebrate-dispersed plants". Oecologia. 86 (4): 463–470. Bibcode:1991Oecol..86..463E. doi:10.1007/BF00318311. ISSN 0029-8549. PMID 28313326.
