= Muschelhaufen =

German annual publication

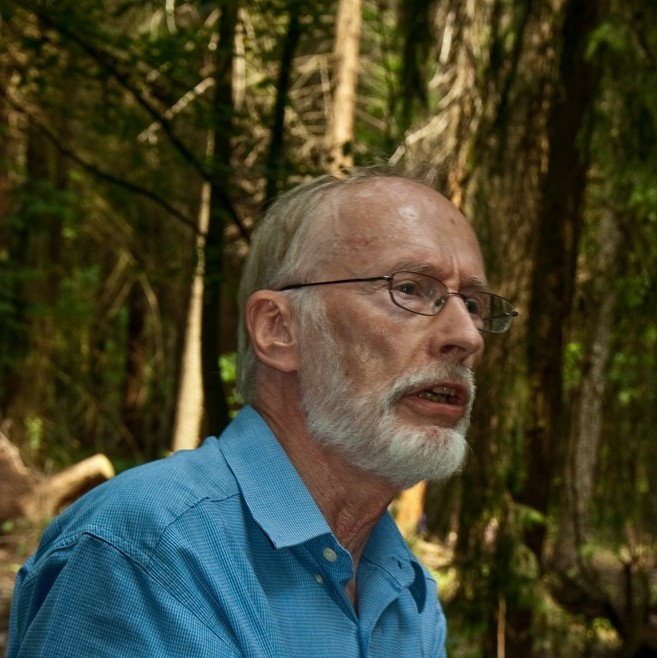
Erik Martin, founder and editor of the literature and art magazine

Muschelhaufen (heap of shells) was a German annual, originally combining literature and graphic arts. It was founded by Erik Martin from Viersen in 1969 and published – with an interruption of 11 years – until 2008, when the last issue came out (No. 47/48-2007/2008).

== History ==
The annual replaced a small magazine that was published from 1962 – 1969 in the wake of the German Youth Movement. When the members finally spread all over the country, literature, arts and music became the main subjects of the review. In 1969 it got the new title and the Muschelhaufen was born.

From 1975 to 1985 there was a publishing-break. Since 1993 only first publications were edited and each issue had an overboarding part of graphics, paintings, cartoons and photographs. In 1999 Muschelhaufen was subtitled "Jahresschrift für Literatur und Graphik". Among the permanent members of the editorial staff were artist Martin Lersch und writer Peter Klusen.

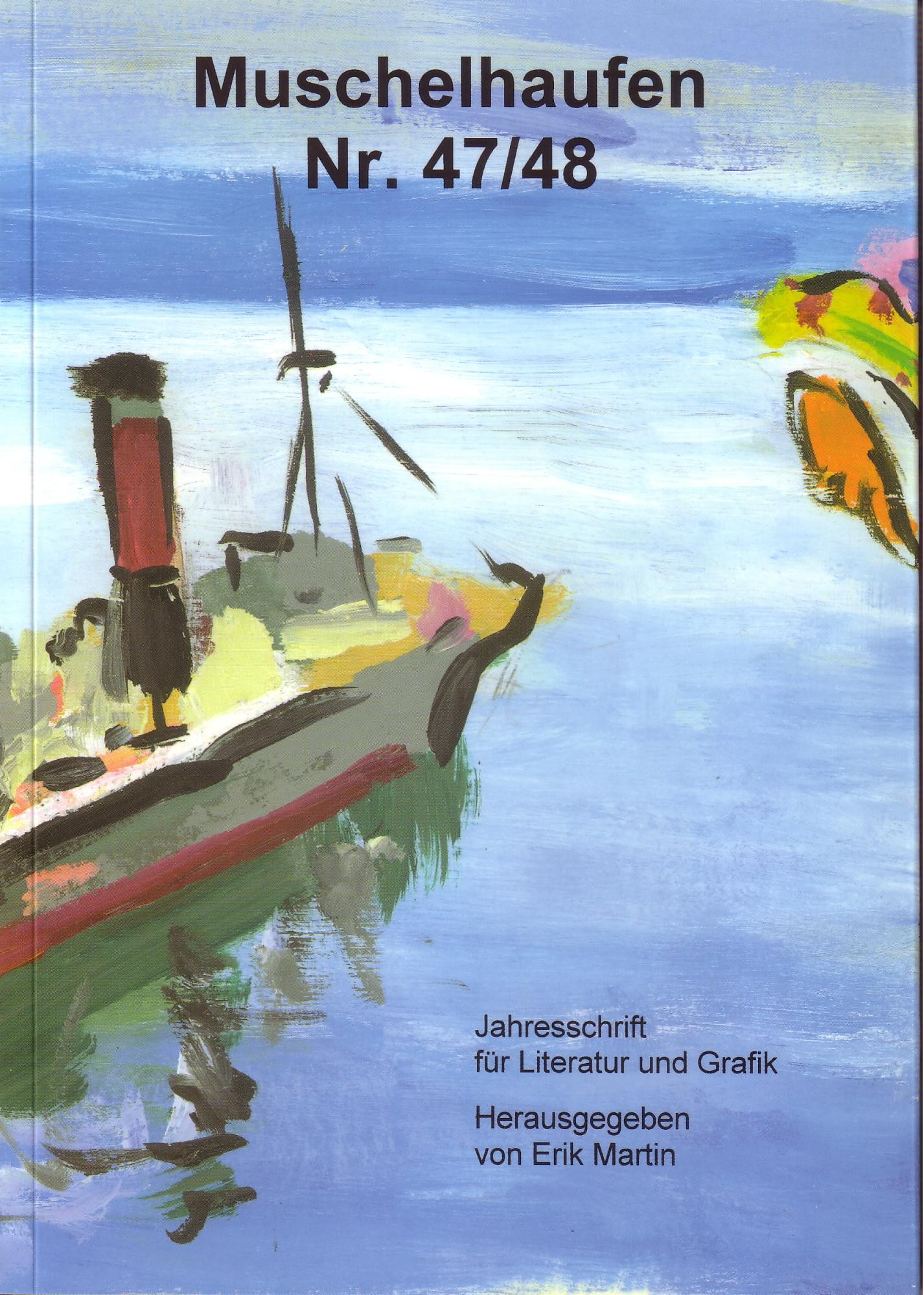
Muschelhaufen (Cover: Martin Lersch)

== Subjects and specialities ==
The subjects of each issue were prose, poetry, essay and critique – throughout combined with illustrations, photographs and graphics. Many famous writers published poems and stories in Muschelhaufen but also new texts by upcoming authors were included, e.g. Katrin Askan, Uwe Tellkamp and Markus Orths – all of whom were awarded later the Ingeborg Bachmann Prize. Theo Breuer, freelancer of Muschelhaufen from 1994 to 2008, annually contributed long essays (e.g. on Mail art, contemporary poetry and prose) and new poems.

Erik Martin edited numerous special editions (dedicated to writers Werner Helwig, Fritz Grasshoff and Margot Scharpenberg and to artist Gertrude Degenhardt). Further special editions concerning the literature of Greenland (2005) and the young Danish and Norwegian literature (2000).

== Writers and artists ==
Well-known writers that published in Muschelhaufen are the Austrian poet Ernst Jandl, Annemarie Schimmel (honoured with the Peace Prize of the German Book Trade), Günter Kunert, Siegfried Lenz, Walter Bauer, Christoph Meckel, Lutz Rathenow and James Krüss and many more.

Erik Martin invested special efforts in recovering the work of the authors Werner Helwig and Albert Vigoleis Thelen (still publishing unknown texts from both). There were – back then – young (Jan Wagner, Anja Utler) and well-known poets (Friederike Mayröcker, Eva Zeller) publishing in the annual and famous artists delivered their photographs and paintings to it (Barbara Klemm, Clemens Weiss, Elke Rehder).

== Secondary Literature ==
- Michael Buselmeier: Hungerphasen, Wandervögel. In: Frankfurter Rundschau, 8 April 2000
- Hermann Kurzke: Mit frischem Wind in die Romantik. In: Frankfurter Allgemeine Zeitung, 1 January 1994
- Paul Wietzorek: Muschelhaufen 2007/2008. In: Der Niederrhein. No. 3/2007, Krefeld, ISSN 0342-5673
