= Peter Klusen =

German writer, translator and cartoonist

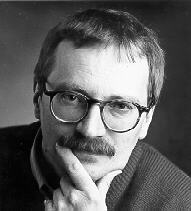
Peter Klusen (1999)

Peter Klusen (born 1951) is a German writer, translator and cartoonist.

== Life and work ==
Peter Klusen was born in Mönchengladbach. He is a German writer and cartoonist. After studying at Johannes Gutenberg University of Mainz and RWTH Aachen University (German language, journalism and social science) he worked as a teacher at FernUniversität Hagen, the only state funded distance education university in Germany, and Mönchengladbach Franz-Meyers High School.

Up from 1980 he started writing plays for children and teenagers. His subjects are often the problems of outsiders and peer pressure as well as the formation and effects of prejudice. But Klusen has also written enchanting fairy-tale plays, poems, narrations, crime stories and revised versions of classical children's literature.

Peter Klusen was a permanent co-worker of the German annual Muschelhaufen (edited by Erik Martin) from 1994 - 2008. In 1998 he was awarded the Bad Wildbad Prize of Children's Literature and in 2007 the F&F Prize of Literature (Frankfurt/M.).

Klusen translated Mark Twain's novel The Prince and the Pauper (Prinz und Bettelknabe, 1996) and also made it into a play that was first performed at the Schauspielhaus Bochum (Theater unter Tage) in 2003. His cartoons are found in journals, calendars and the German satirical magazine Eulenspiegel.

Peter Klusen is married and lives in Viersen.

== Publications ==
=== Poems, narrations, crime stories and novels ===
- Riesenfrieder, Kuchenkrümel und der große Bär. Die Geschichte von einem, der auszog das Fürchten zu verlernen. 1991, ISBN 3-926525-09-6
- Gullivers Reisen. (Gulliver's Travels). Translation. 1993, ISBN 3-401-04474-5
- lichterloh im siebten himmel. Poems. 1994, ISBN 3-922690-51-3
- Die wunderbare Reise des kleinen Nils Holgersson mit den Wildgänsen. (The Wonderful Adventures of Nils). Translation. 1994, ISBN 3-401-04496-6
- Nußknacker und Mausekönig (The Nutcracker and the Mouse King). Neubearbeitung. 1995, ISBN 3-401-04431-1
- Rettet dem Lehrer. Cartoons. (Editor). 1996, ISBN 3-87038-282-1
- Prinz und Bettelknabe. (The Prince and the Pauper.) Translation. 1996, ISBN 3-401-04629-2
- Märchen aus 1001 Nacht. (One Thousand and One Nights.) Nacherzählungen ausgewählter Geschichten. 1999, ISBN 3-401-04941-0
- Der Tod kostet mehr als das Leben. Crime stories. 2004, ISBN 3-88081-538-0
- augenzwinkernd. eine lyrische kammersinfonie in drei sätzen. Poems. 2008, ISBN 978-3-88081-505-6
- Der lächerliche Ernst des Lebens. Novel. 2010, ISBN 978-3-88081-518-6

=== Plays ===
- Das Wunderelixier. Ein Schulmärchen. 1984, ISBN 3-7695-1510-2
- Die chinesischen Gartenzwerge. Eine Farce voller Vorurteile. 1984, ISBN 3-7695-0586-7
- Die computergesteuerte Regenmaschine. Eine turbulente Gangsterjagd. 1986, ISBN 3-7695-0599-9
- Riesenfrieder, Kuchenkrümel und der große Bär. 1987, ISBN 3-7695-0332-5
- Das Fest der Frösche. Ein gewagtes Spiel mit Musik. 1993, ISBN 3-7695-0326-0
- Desperado oder Jeder ist seines Glückes Schmied. Deutscher Theaterverlag. Weinheim 1993, ISBN 3-7695-0326-0
- Klapsmühle. Sketche. 1998, ISBN 3-89778-704-0
- Das Zauberkissen. Märchenspiel. 2002, ISBN 3-7695-1728-8
