= Erik Martin (writer) =

German writer, songwriter and composer (1936-2017)

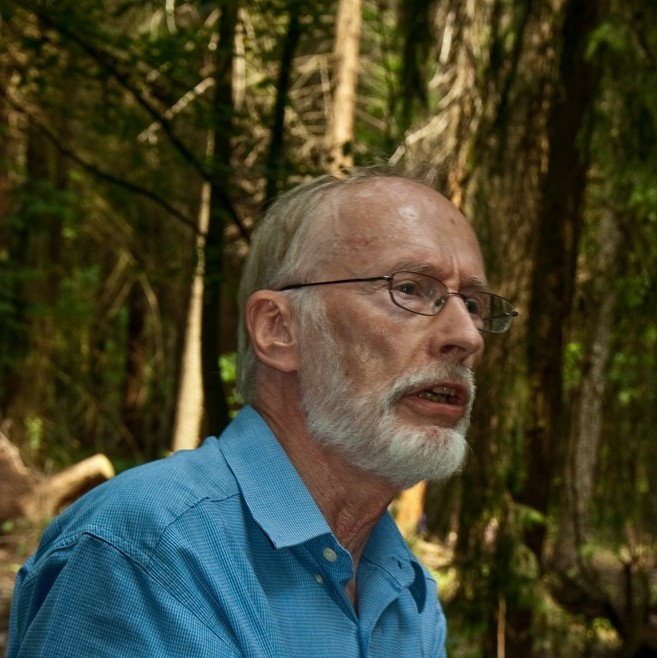
Erik Martin (2010)

Erik Martin (12 January 1936 in Neuss – 25 April 2017) was a German writer, songwriter and composer of songs. He was the founder and editor of the literature and art magazine Muschelhaufen.

== Life and work ==
Erik Martin was the first-born son of Illa and Ernst J. Martin – both dentists and dendrologists; they were the founders of the Sequoiafarm Kaldenkirchen. His sister is the tree-and-bush expert Helge Breloer. Martin grew up in Kaldenkirchen, went to Aloisiuskolleg in Bad Godesberg and graduated at Thomaeum High-School Kempen. After studies in Aachen he worked as a teacher of German and Biology in Viersen, where he created schoolgardens and worked out environmental projects joining the German Waldjugend. In 1997 he received the Klaus-Gundelach-Prize for his merits concerning his environmental protection and his youth novel Fjellwanderung.

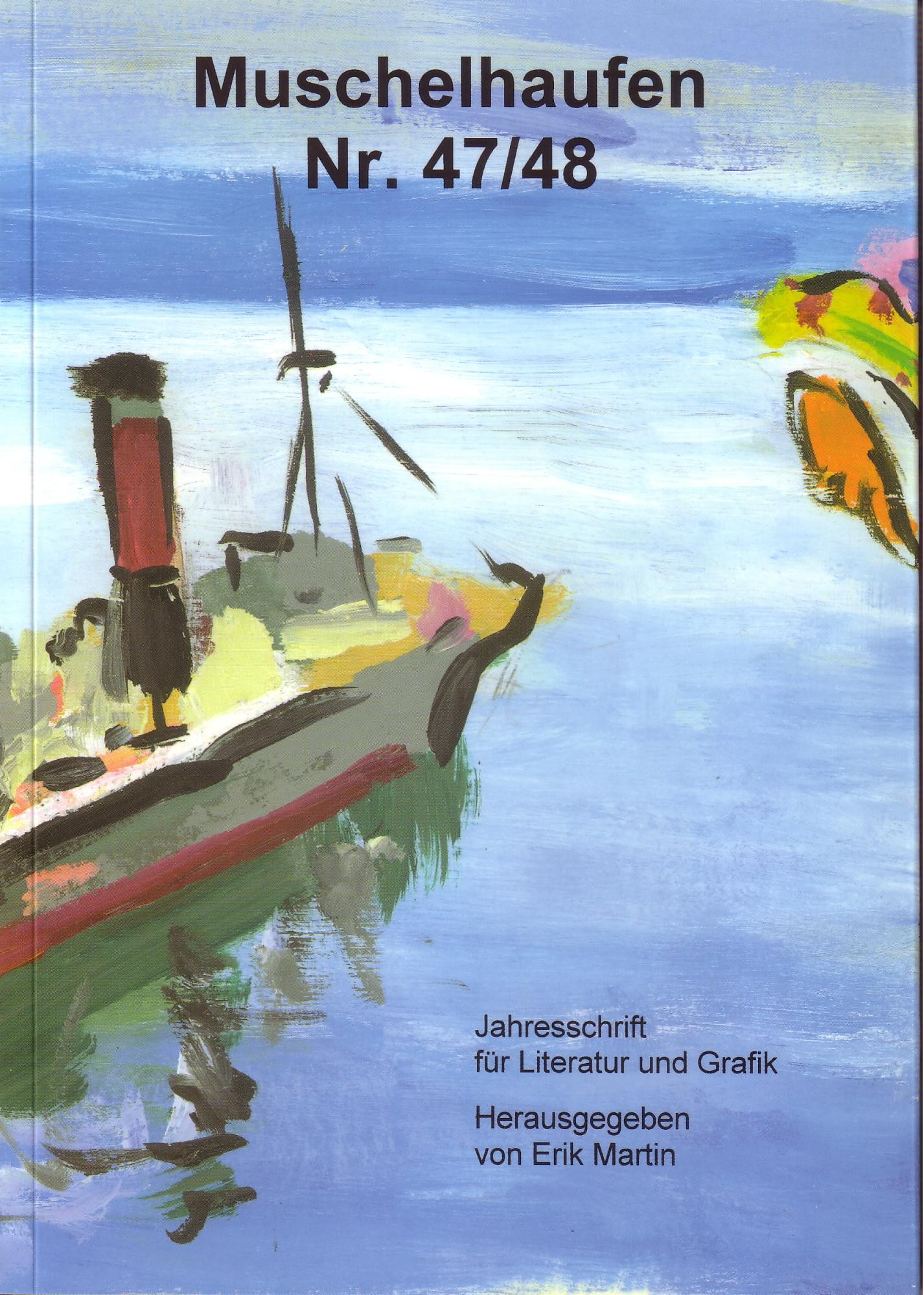
Muschelhaufen (Cover: Martin Lersch)

From 1969 to 2008 Erik Martin edited Muschelhaufen, an annual for literature and graphics. In numerous special editions he helped recover writers such as Albert Vigoleis Thelen, Margot Scharpenberg or Fritz Grasshoff. Stories and Poems by well-known writers such as Ernst Jandl, Annemarie Schimmel (honoured with the Peace Prize of the German Book Trade), Günter Kunert, Siegfried Lenz, Christoph Meckel and James Krüss were first published in Muschelhaufen. Artists like Elke Rehder or Clemens Weiss used to work for the magazine. With great care, Martin studied Werner Helwig's books and wrote essential essays on his work.

Martin's songs are well-known and often sung in the groups of the German Youth Movement, the German folk and the German Scout Movement. One of those is the popular Wenn der Abend naht (When the evening comes) . As youth leader for many years Martin led groups to whose members he was known as Mac. Up to this day he participates in the Deutsche Waldjugend activities and has written articles for several magazines, e.g. der eisbrecher, scouting and Fang. Two CDs with Martin's songs were edited by the Waldjugend.

Erik Martin was married. He had two sons and lived in Viersen-Dülken.

== Publications ==
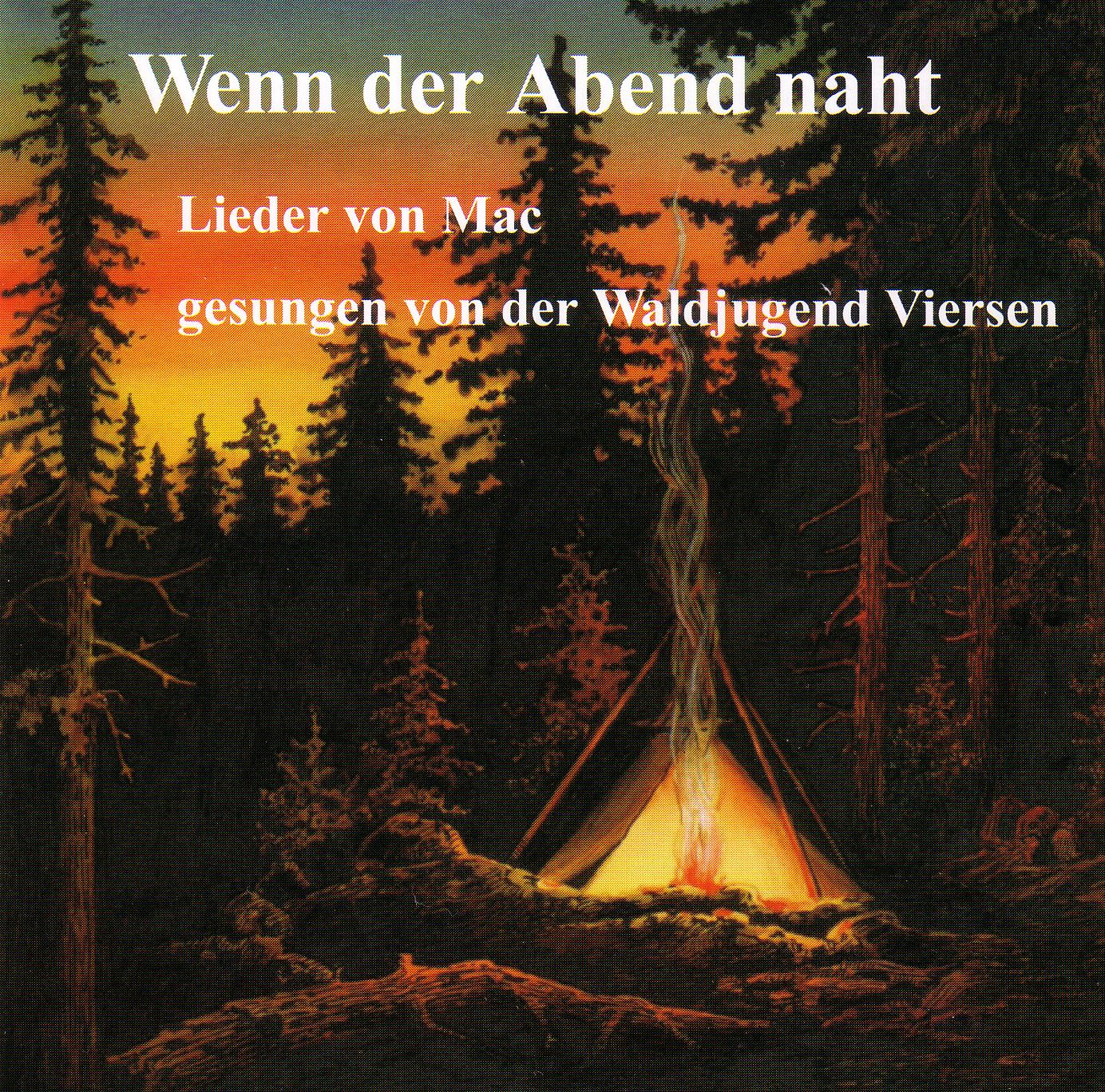
CD-Cover Wenn der Abend naht

- Macs Fahrtenbuch (1971)
- Vom Singen in den Gruppen (1981)
- Waldläuferheft für Nordlandfahrer und Liederfreunde (1982)
- Liederblätter deutscher Jugend. Vol. 27 (1984). ISSN 0342-4820
- Fjellwanderung. Novel. (1986). ISBN 3-88258-094-1
- Das kleine Grenzwaldbuch (= Muschelhaufen. Vol. 24/25-1987/88). ISSN 0085-3593
- Werner Helwig. Special edition Muschelhaufen. Vol. 26A (1991). ISSN 0085-3593
- Die schwierigen Jahre. Biography. (1995). ISBN 978-3-910172-31-9
- Etwas andere Geschichten zum Vorlesen (1996)
- Wenn der Abend naht. Lieder von Mac. CD. (1996 and 2000)
- Heut wird die Hexe verbrannt. CD. (2006)
