= Adolf Hofrichter =

German politician

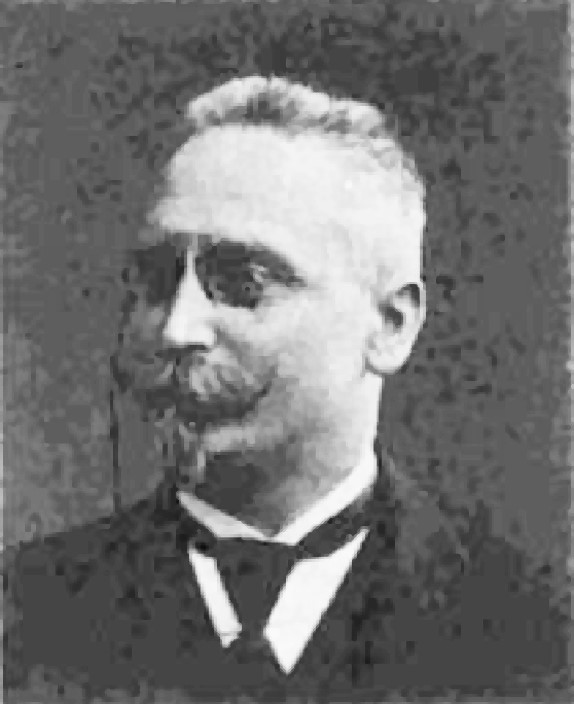
Adolf Hofrichter (16 March 1857 – 14 October 1916)

Adolf Hofrichter (16 March 1857 – 14 October 1916) was a German plumber and locksmith who became a Social Democratic (SPD) editor, party official, and politician. He stood for election to the Reichstag (parliament) in a succession of general elections between 1893 and 1912. Nationally, the Social Democratic Party received more votes than any other party in every general election between 1890 and 1912, but their votes were concentrated in urban electoral districts which had far larger electorates than the more conservative rural districts. 1912 was the first time that the party won the largest number of seats, and was also the first time that Hofrichter, elected to represent Cologne City Electoral District, won a seat in the Reichstag. He would remain a member until his death four and a half years later.

== Biography ==
Adolf Gustav Adalbert Hofrichter was born in Danzig (as Gdańsk was known to the city's German speaking majority, and to Anglophones before 1945). His father was a tax official. Slightly unusually for those times, he appears to have grown up in a family without public church connections. While still a child, he was evidently relocated to Prussia's Rhine Province. He attended school in Danzig and Kranenburg, and undertook his apprenticeship at Kaldenkirchen, near the Dutch border, in the extreme west of the country. Having learned the complementary trades of a locksmith and a plumber, he worked at these trades in various Rhine Province towns: by 1892 he was employed as a locksmith's assistant. He had already, in 1881, joined the (by some criteria illegal between 1878 and 1891) Social Democratic Party ("Sozialdemokratische Partei Deutschlands" / SPD). He had also served, between 1877 and 1880, in the 4th Westphalia Infantry Regiment.

At the start of 1890, the Reichstag refused to renew the Anti-Socialist Laws, and Chancellor Bismarck would resign a few months later. Over the next couple of years, it became apparent that the legislation had lapsed for good. During the early 1890s, Hofrichter served as chairman of the Cologne SPD. In January 1892, Adolf Hofrichter took over as chief executive ("Geschäftsführer") at the newly relaunched Rheinische Zeitung (newspaper), retaining the position until February 1894. He joined the editorial department in 1894 and remained with the paper as a contributor-journalist, backer, and publisher until 1901, though sources describing him simply as the publication's editor may be oversimplifying and overstating the situation. He subsequently became chair of the "Press Commission".

Hofrichter was elected local party chairman in 1895. Between 1897 and 1901, he headed the party's "Agitation Commission" for the Upper Rhine province. Then, until 1905, he led the city's newly created Labour Secretariat ("Arbeitersekretäriat"). He was then appointed Regional Party Secretary ("Bezirksparteisekretär") for the entire surrounding region, which at that time was frequently identified as the upper Rhine Province (roughly corresponding to the western half of the modern state of North Rhine-Westphalia). He served in this capacity between 1905 until his death in 1916. At the same time, he continued to serve as chairman of the party in Cologne and as a member of the party regional executive committee for the upper Rhine Province.

Following nearly 20 years of standing as a Reichstag candidate in various electoral districts in Cologne, Koblenz, and Trier, in 1912 Adolf Hofrichter became "the first Social Democrat in Cologne elected to the Reichstag". The outbreak of the First World War meant that there would not be another general election until 1919. Hofrichter was still a member of the Reichstag when he died in 1916. He served on various parliamentary committees including those concerned with Disciplinary Procedures [in the Reichstag], Business and Trade, Trade Monopolies, Budget Matters, Military Disloyalty, and Housing.
