= Walter Bauer (writer) =

German-Canadian writer (1904–1976)

- Born: November 4, 1904; Merseburg, Germany
- Died: December 23, 1976 (aged 72); Toronto, Ontario, Canada
- Occupations: biographer, novelist and poet

Walter Bauer (November 4, 1904 – December 23, 1976) was a German-Canadian biographer, novelist and poet.

Walter Bauer showed himself a promising poet in pre-Hitler Germany, but with the rise of the Nazis he found his poetry being banned. He became an elementary school teacher and after the war had high hopes for a literary life. However, in 1953, feeling the cynicism of the German Economic Miracle, he emigrated to Canada where, after a stint as a dishwasher, he became a professor in the German Department of the University of Toronto in Toronto, Ontario in 1954.

He wrote six novels, two collections of poetry and four biographies (including one on Van Gogh and another on Grey Owl). He also wrote plays and essays. He has been published in numerous literary magazines, such as Muschelhaufen.
