= Katrin Askan =

German author (born 1966)

Katrin Askan (1966) is a German author. She was born in East Germany, but in 1986, three years before the changes that finally adumbrated an end to the one-party dictatorship, she managed to escape to the west. A (slightly) fictionalised version of the long build-up to the event and of the escape itself, with a powerful resonance of authenticity, constitutes the core of her 2000 novel "Aus dem Schneider".

== Life and works ==
Katrin Askan was born in East Berlin. After passing her Abitur (school leaving exams), which under most circumstances would have cleared the path to university-level education, she was enrolled on a traineeship in a hospital. She subsequently found work in a book shop. In 1986 she succeeded in smuggling herself into West Berlin, apparently taking an indirect route that included, during the most critical stage in the exercise, three hours in the boot of a car from the west. This was followed by a lengthy stay in Sweden where one of the ways in which she supported herself was by undertaking translation work on programmes for radio stations. She went on to study Germanistics and Philosophy at the Free University in the part of the city known before 1990 as West Berlin. Then, in 1998, Askan moved to Germany's western media capital, Cologne, where she supports herself as a freelance author and Swedish language translator.

Askan's debut novel, "A-Dur", (Note: "A-Dur" translates into English as "A major") appeared in 1996. Set in Berlin, it deals with the lives in the German Democratic Republic of three different characters and the destruction of their three individual dreams. It also treats the more generalised disorientation characteristic of post-modern societies. It was well reviewed by critics. "Aus dem Schneider", (Note: "Aus dem Schneider" translates into English literally as "from the tailor" or "tailor-made". However, in colloquial usage it also sometimes refers to what in English approximates to "getting out of the soup". In both languages, this colloquial usage is becoming old fashioned, however.) which appeared four years later, was three times as long and founder a wider audience. It touched on a number of the same themes.

Since 1988, Askan has also been publishing poems and prose pieces in various journals and anthologies. An example is her short story "Der Skorpion" which appeared in Muschelhaufen. She has also authored a number of radio pieces for Rundfunk Berlin-Brandenburg's Ohrenbär, a producer of radio programmes for children aged between four and eight.

== Recognition ==
In 1998 Katrin Askan won the Friedrich Hölderlin Literary Award ("Förderpreis") from the municipality of Bad Homburg. In 1999 she was the recipient of the annual Rolf-Dieter Brinkmann Stipendium, funded and administered by her home city of Cologne. In 2001 she won the "3sat-Prize", one of several annual awards made at the (Klagenfurt) Festival of German-Language Literature, for her novella "Landläufig".

== Selected works ==
- Askan, Katrin (1998). A-Dur : Roman. Halle: Mitteldeutscher Verlag. ISBN 3-932776-15-1. OCLC 39628224.
- Askan, Katrin (1998). Eisenengel : Roman (in German). Halle: Mitteldeutscher Verlag. ISBN 3-932776-20-8. OCLC 39955163.
- Askan, Katrin (2000). Aus dem Schneider : Roman (in German). Berlin: Berlin Verlag. ISBN 3-8270-0358-X. OCLC 45209186.
- Askan, Katrin (2002). Wiederholungstäter : Erzählungen (in German). Berlin: Berlin Verlag. ISBN 3-8270-0421-7. OCLC 49333558.
