= Lutz Rathenow =

German writer and poet

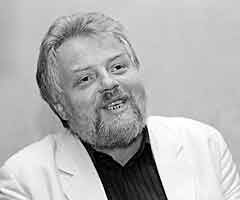
Lutz Rathenow (2005)

Lutz Rathenow (born 22 September 1952 in Jena) is a dissident German writer and poet who was haunted by the Secret Police until the German reunification. From then on, his fortunes changed, and he received several literary honors and awards.

== Life and work ==
Born in Jena, Thuringia, which in 1952 was part of the German Democratic Republic (GDR), Rathenow studied at the University of Jena after serving in the military. In 1976 he was relegated because he was one of the students who protested against the expatriation of Wolf Biermann, a prominent German singer and songwriter.

Moving to Berlin, Rathenow began to write, but he could not at all start his career as a free-lance writer. Having published his first collection of stories in the Federal Republic of Germany (FRG), Ratenow was arrested in December 1980. This first book of the young author, like many to follow, was considered unflattering to the German Democratic Republic. When released a month later after international protest, Rathenow continued to write satires, sketches and poems, refusing to emigrate. Moreover, the author was in a way acting as a spokesman for dissident writers within the GDR. Inside this country, his works were suppressed by the Ministry of Culture, but circulated privately. Such was the pantomime, Keine Tragödie ("No Tragedy"), cancelled a couple of days before its scheduled performance in Leipzig in 1984.

Despite close surveillance by the notorious Secret Police (Staatssicherheit or Stasi), Rathenow and his friends managed to smuggle manuscripts out to the West to be published there. Outstanding among his books are:

- Boden 411 ("Floor 411"), 1984), a collection of short plays;
- Die lautere Bosheit ("Outright Mischief", 1992), a collection of satires and short prose; and
- Der Wettlauf mit dem Licht ("Racing with Light", 1999), a collection of poems.

The last pieces of Rathenow are two prose collections which appeared in 2004: a book entitled Fortsetzung folgt ("To Be Continued") of 144 pages, and, under the same German title, various texts which are read by the author himself.

After the German reunification, Rathenow received several literary honours and prizes, e.g. the Deutschlandpreis for his collection of short stories, first published under the title, Sisyphos in 1995 ("Sisyphos. Erzählungen"; Berlin Verlag, 2004, 4th ed., 160 p.). As a cultural figure, Rathenow fills in the function of arts editor for the quarterly magazine, "Liberal" (sponsored by Friedrich-Naumann-Stiftung at Berlin), in an honorary capacity. Since 1977, Rathenow has lived as a free-lancer at Straußberger Platz, in the centre of Berlin, the new and old German capital.

== His books ==
The following is a list of all the books written by Rathenow, and published by Xenox Books and Jaron Publ., unless otherwise stated, in English and German:

- Contacts The Poet's Press (1995)
- Die lautere Bosheit. Satiren – Faststücke – Prosa. Maulwurf Verlag, Remchingen (1992), 128 Seiten ISBN 3-929007-11-8
- Oder was schwimmt da im Auge; m. Abbildungen v. Reinhard Kleist, hrgg. v. Axel Kutsch. Verlag Landpresse: Ed. Lyrik, Weilerswist (1993), 20 Seiten ISBN 3-930137-03-8
- Sisyphos. Erzählungen. Berlin: Berlin Verlag, (1995), 4. Auflage (2000), 160 Seiten ISBN 3-8270-0135-8
- Jahrhundert der Blicke. Neue Gedichte. Landpresse, Weilerswist (1997), 48 Seiten ISBN 3-930137-56-9
- Der Wettlauf mit dem Licht. Letzte Gedichte aus einem Jahrhundert. Landpresse, Weilerswist (1999), 48 Seiten; (2001³) ISBN 3-930137-82-8
- Vom DDR-Bürger zum EU-Bürger. Spezifische Integrationsschübe und Integrationshemmnisse aus der Sicht eines ostdeutschen Schriftstellers. Universität Bonn; Zentrum für Europäische Integrationsforschung, Bonn (2000), 21 Seiten [ISBN 3933307651
- Es war einmal ein Wolf. Texte für Kinder jeglichen Alters. Burgverlag, Weißensee (2000), 144 Seiten ISBN 3-931303-09-8
- Sterben will gelernt sein. Ein Jahrhundert tritt ab. Lyrische Prosa und prosaische Lyrik. Bilder von Frank van der Leeuw, Landpresse, Weilerswist (2000, 2002³), 56 Seiten ISBN 3-930137-94-1
- The Fantastic Ordinary World of Lutz Rathenow: Poems, Plays & Stories; Deutsch/Englisch, Xenos Books. Riverside/CA (2001, 2002³), 202 p. ISBN 1-879378-31-0
- Vom DDR-Grenzsoldaten zum Bürgerrechtler; hrgg.v.Wissenschaftlichen Forum für Internationale Sicherheit; Militärgeschichtliches Forschungsamt. Temmen Verlag: Edition Temmen, Bremen (2002), 32 Seiten ISBN 3-86108-023-0
- Das RR-Projekt. Texte Töne Trash. Heinz Ratz singt liest spielt Lutz Rathenow. CD mit Booklet, ca. 45 Minuten; Edition HörZeichenVerlag, Leipzig, (2002, 2003²) ISBN 3-934492-15-0
- Die Fünfzig. Gedichte. Landpresse, Weilerswist (2002), 79 Seiten; (2005²) ISBN 3-935221-10-X
- Fortsetzung folgt. Prosa zum Tage. Illustrationen von Frank von der Leeuw. Landpresse, Weilerswist (2003), 144 Seiten ISBN 3-935221-28-2
- Der Himmel ist heut blau. Geschichten und Gedichte für Kinder. Illustrationen Egbert Herfurth, Schulbuchausgabe, Auer Verlag, Donauwörth (2004), 64 Seiten. ISBN 3-403-04311-8
- Fortsetzung folgt. Prosa zum Tage. Hörbuch, gelesen vom Author. 2 CDs im Digipack mit Booklet, ca. 137 Minuten; HörZeichenVerlag, Leipzig. (2005) ISBN 3-934492-33-9
- Ost-Berlin. Leben vor dem Mauerfall ("Life before the Wall fell"). Fotos von/photographed by Harald Hauswald. Jaron Verlag, Berlin (2005, 2005³), 128 p. ISBN 3-89773-522-9

== Anthologies ==
Rathenow has contributed to several anthologies, e.g. "An Essay on the Path of Virtuousness" (Tugendvergewisserung: Ein Traum, was sonst? Preußische Tugenden, ed. Bernd Kaufmann; Wallstein, Göttingen, 2002); or his notes as a victim of the East German secret police ("Stasi") after having read his file (as published in: Stasi-Akten zwischen Politik und Zeitgeschichte. Eine Zwischenbilanz, ed. Siegfried Suckut/Jürgen Weber; Olzog, München 2003). He has published in numerous literary magazines, such as Muschelhaufen.

Moreover, there is a bulk of texts, e.g. political comments and other short pieces, within the World Wide Web: * Meine Stasiaufarbeitung (Juli 1977: Wiener Journal);

- Literatur und Bücher (Juli 1998: Berliner Lesezeichen);
- Das Weiterwirken der DDR durch ihr Verschwinden (November 1999: Kommune);
- Akten, Fakten und Politiker (April 2000: Deutschland Radio);
- Die Routine der Verzweiflung (Juli 2000: Wiener Journal).

Finally, a German scholar, Dr. Udo Scheer, published a study on the political and cultural opponents in Jena – including Rathenow as a student – since the middle of the 1970s: Vision und Wirklichkeit. Opposition in Jena in den 70er und 80er Jahren (Christoph Links, Berlin (2000³))
