= Helge Breloer =

German jurist (1937–2011)

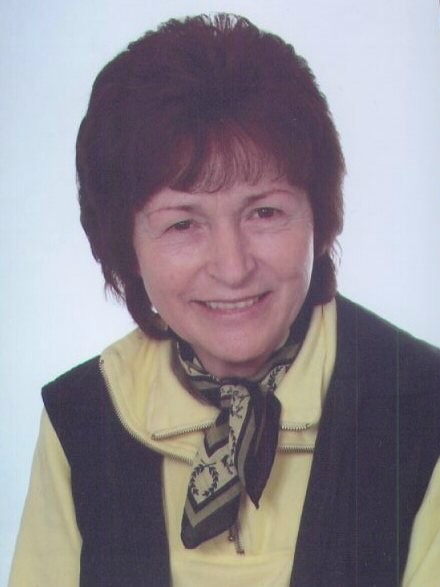
- Born: Helge Martin; October 28, 1937; Mönchengladbach, Germany
- Died: April 23, 2011 (aged 73); Dortmund, Germany
- Occupations: Jurist; tree-appraisal expert; author

Helge Breloer née Martin (October 28, 1937 – April 23, 2011) was a German jurist, tree-appraisal expert, and author of nonfiction books.

== Life and work ==
Helge Breloer was born in Mönchengladbach. She was the daughter of Illa und Ernst J. Martin, both dentists and dendrologists and founders of the Sequoiafarm Kaldenkirchen. She had two brothers, the landscape architect Reiner Martin and the author, editor and song composer Erik Martin. Breloer attended the School of Our Lady in Muelhausen at the Lower Rhine, Germany, and studied legal science in Cologne, Freiburg and Munich. Breloer was an expert at arboriculture, specialized in legal aspects and the appraisal of trees and shrubs. In these areas of expertise she was publicly appointed and sworn by the chamber of agriculture of North Rhine-Westphalia from 1982 to 2009. From 2001 to 2008 she lectured Applied Science at the University of Osnabrück.

From 1983 to 1993, Breloer worked with expert witness Werner Koch, who developed the first method for tree appraisal that was accepted by the Federal Court of Justice of Germany. After his death in 1993 she continued their mutual work further using the Koch method which is recognized by jurisdiction as well as in practice. With Claus Mattheck, professor at the Karlsruhe Institute of Technology, she worked on tree failure analysis.

Breloer published numerous articles in horticultural and silvicultural journals and is the author of the book and journal series Bäume und Recht (trees and the law). In addition, she focused on the protection of heritage trees, spoke publicly and published articles against tree topping.

Twice a year, she hosted a seminar called Round Table: trees and the law which was free of charge and open to beginners as well as experienced consulting arborists, bringing them up-to-date on tree jurisdiction. She was the initiator of the "Baum-Zentrum", a "tree center" (training center) founded in Tecklenburg in 2006. Together with Frank Rinn, Breloer developed an as simple as possible two-page form software for tree appraisal that helped many experts to determine the value of trees.

Breloer was a lecturer at several workshops throughout Germany, Austria and the Netherlands. She was continually engaged in the protection and preservation of trees, arguing against excessive safety requirements concerning the road traffic safety of trees.

Breloer, mother of three children, died at Easter 2011 in Dortmund after suffering severe inner injuries caused by a riding accident.

== Quote ==
She never ceased taking sides for trees and people working in tree-care and consultancy. In her approx. thirty years of dedicated work and fight for trees – arguing against excessive safety requirements concerning road traffic safety of trees, struggling for appropriate working conditions for the municipal tree wardens, proper tree care, fighting all remaining tree-injustices – she has left deep marks.

— Hans-Joachim Schulz

== Selected works ==
- Eingriffe in den Wurzelbereich von Bäumen. Beweissicherung, Ursachenermittlung, Schadensberechnung (together with Werner Koch, Gregor Blauermel). SVK-Verlag. Wilndorf 1984. ISBN 3-89061-031-5
- Baumwert und Baumschutzsatzung. Wertermittlung einer Ahorngruppe im Geltungsbereich der Baumschutzsatzung (together with Werner Koch. SVK-Verlag. Wilnsdorf 1986. ISBN 3-89061-064-1
- Gewährleistung bei Pflanzarbeiten: Schäden an Bäumen durch unzureichende Bodenvorbereitung und nicht fachgerechte Pflanzung. SVK-Verlag. Wilnsdorf 1986. ISBN 3-89061-065-X
- Wertermittlung von Bäumen und Sträuchern. Die vom Bundesgerichtshof anerkannte Methode Koch im Vergleich zu anderen Methoden. SVK-Verlag. Wilnsdorf 1988. ISBN 3-89061-082-X
- Baum und Strauch im Nachbarrecht. Grenzabstände in den Landesgesetzen. SVK-Verlag. Wilnsdorf 1988. ISBN 3-89061-078-1
- Verkehrssicherungspflicht bei Bäumen aus rechtlicher und fachlicher Sicht. SVK-Verlag. Wilnsdorf 1989. ISBN 3-89061-089-7
- Handbuch der Schadenskunde von Bäumen. Der Baumbruch in Mechanik und Rechtsprechung (together with Claus Mattheck). Rombach. Freiburg/Breisgau 1993. ISBN 3-7930-9085-X
- The body language of trees. A handbook for failure analysis. Claus Mattheck/Helge Breloer. Research for Amenity trees No. 4, HMSO Publications Centre. London 1994. ISBN 0-11-753067-0
- Handboek Boomveiligheid. De boombreuk in mechanica en rechtsspraak. Claus Mattheck/Helge Breloer. Pius Floris Produkties NL. Almere-Haven 1995. ISBN 90-802806-1-5
- Was ist mein Baum wert? Ein Ratgeber für Bürger. Thalacker. Braunschweig 1995. ISBN 3-87815-070-9
- Aktualisierte Gehölzwerttabellen. Bäume und Sträucher als Grundstücksbestandteile an Straßen, in Parks und Gärten sowie in der freien Landschaft; einschließlich Obstgehölze (Author Werner Koch, modified by Helge Breloer). – Auszug – VVW. Karlsruhe 1997. ISBN 3-88487-634-1
- Bäume, Sträucher und Hecken im Nachbarrecht. Grenzabstände in den Landesgesetzen. Thalacker-Medien. Braunschweig 1998. ISBN 3-87815-072-5
- La stabilità degli alberi. Fenomeni meccanici e implicazioni legali dei cedimenti degli alberi (by Claus Mattheck and Helge Breloer). Versione italiana a cura di: Coop. Demetra r.l. Trad.: Patrizia Gatti. Verde Ed. Milano 1998. ISBN 88-86569-06-8
- Grünflächen-Pflegemanagement. Dynamische Pflege von Grün. 45 Tabellen (Ed. Alfred Niesel). Ulmer. Stuttgart 2006. ISBN 978-3-8001-4948-3
