= Kaldenkirchen =

- Stadtteil of Nettetal
- Coat of arms
- Interactive map of Kaldenkirchen
- Location within Germany Location within North Rhine-Westphalia
- Coordinates: 51°19′N 6°17′E
- Country: Germany
- State: North Rhine-Westphalia
- Admin. region: Düsseldorf
- District: Viersen
- Town: Nettetal

Area
  - Total: 20.13 km^{2} (7.77 sq mi)
- Elevation: 40 m (130 ft)

Population (2020-12-31)
  - Total: 10,025
  - Density: 498.0/km^{2} (1,290/sq mi)
- Time zone: UTC+01:00 (CET)
  - Summer (DST): UTC+02:00 (CEST)
- Postal codes: 41334
- Dialling codes: 02153, 02157, 02158
- Vehicle registration: VIE

Kaldenkirchen (Limburgish: Kaldekerke) is a town in North Rhine-Westphalia in Germany, situated close to the Dutch border at Venlo. It is part of the municipality of Nettetal.

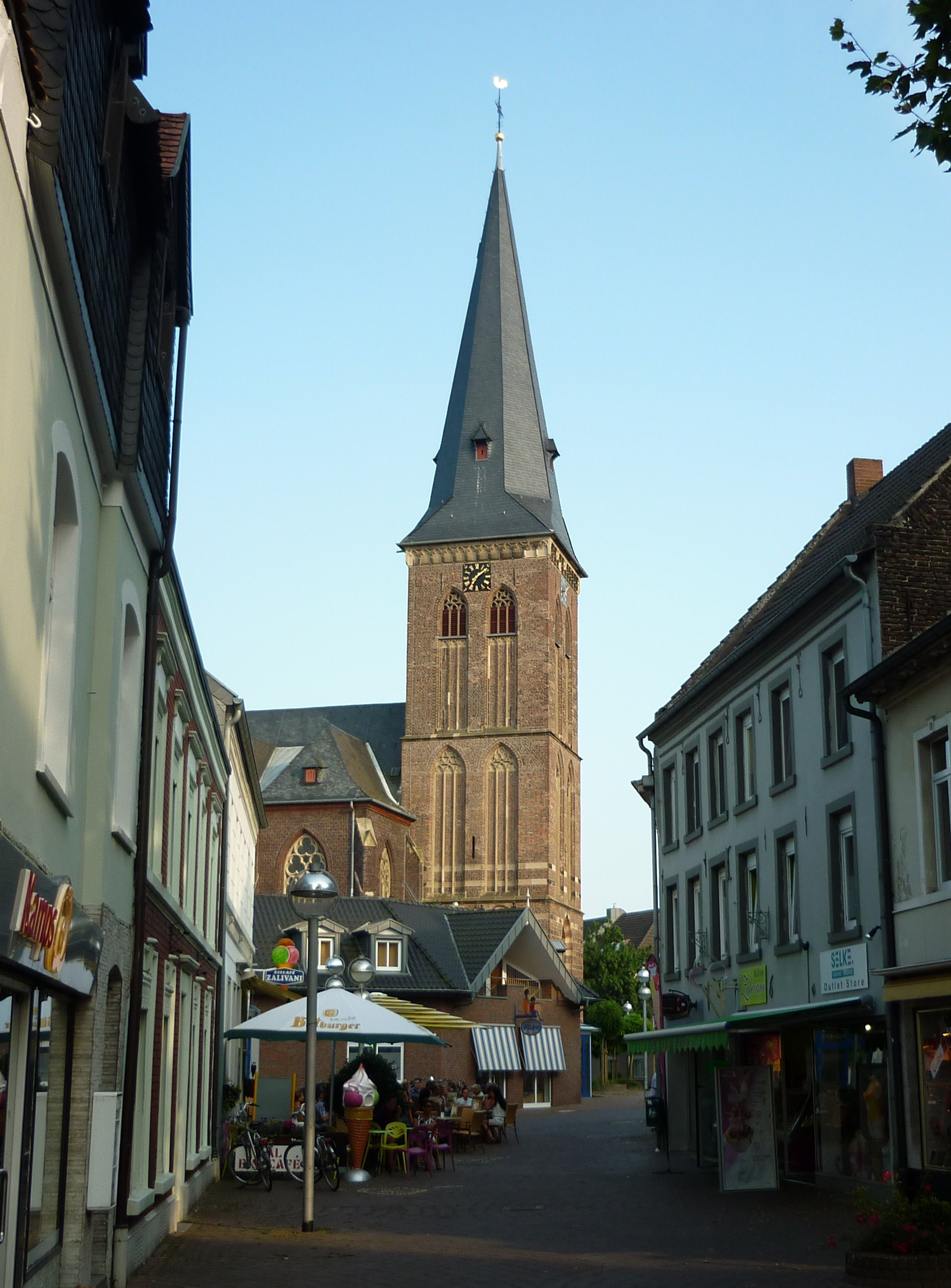
Church St. Clemens

== History ==
The earliest reference to “Caldenkirken” appears in a document dated 1206.

Until 1794 the city belonged to the Duchy of Jülich. After the Congress of Vienna in 1814 Kaldenkirchen lay within the borders of Prussia. In In 1856 King Frederick William IV of Prussia permitted the use of “town” for this city. 1903 the German Emperor Wilhelm II permitted the city arms.

The synagogue was destroyed during the Kristallnacht. The city was evacuated during the last weeks of the Second World War. In 1947 a fire destroyed 90% of the surrounding forest.

In 1961 Kaldenkirchen had a population of 6305, 23% of whom were refugees. On 1 January 1970 Kaldenkirchen became part of the newly founded city of Nettetal.

Families from Kaldenkirchen were among the earliest emigrants to Pennsylvania. In 1683 thirteen German families emigrated on the ship Concord sailing from Rotterdam to Philadelphia. These families were members of the Religious Society of Friends (aka "Quakers") and Mennonites. Most were from the town of Krefeld, but some were from Kaldenkirchen. These thirteen families founded Germantown. Subsequent emigrants from Kaldenkirchen to Germantown included Paulus and Gertrude Kuster, the great-great-great-great-grandparents of U.S. Army colonel George Armstrong Custer.

== Economy ==
For more than 150 years the economic life of Kaldenkirchen was characterized by the tobacco industry. At the turn of the century the roof tiles industry was active for some years due to the resources of clay in the Grenzwald (forest bordering Germany and the Netherlands).

As Kaldenkirchen is situated near the border it was an important reloading point with a main customs office and many freight forwarders until 1993. Currently there are various inter-regional companies like the plant nursery Lappen, the producer of sound cards TerraTec, the food company Halal Mekkafood and the German Branch Office of Panini Comics.

== Transport ==
Kaldenkirchen has direct access to the autobahn A61 and has three exits. It also has a train station with double-tracked passenger and freight traffic to Venlo/NL and single-tracked traffic to Mönchengladbach.

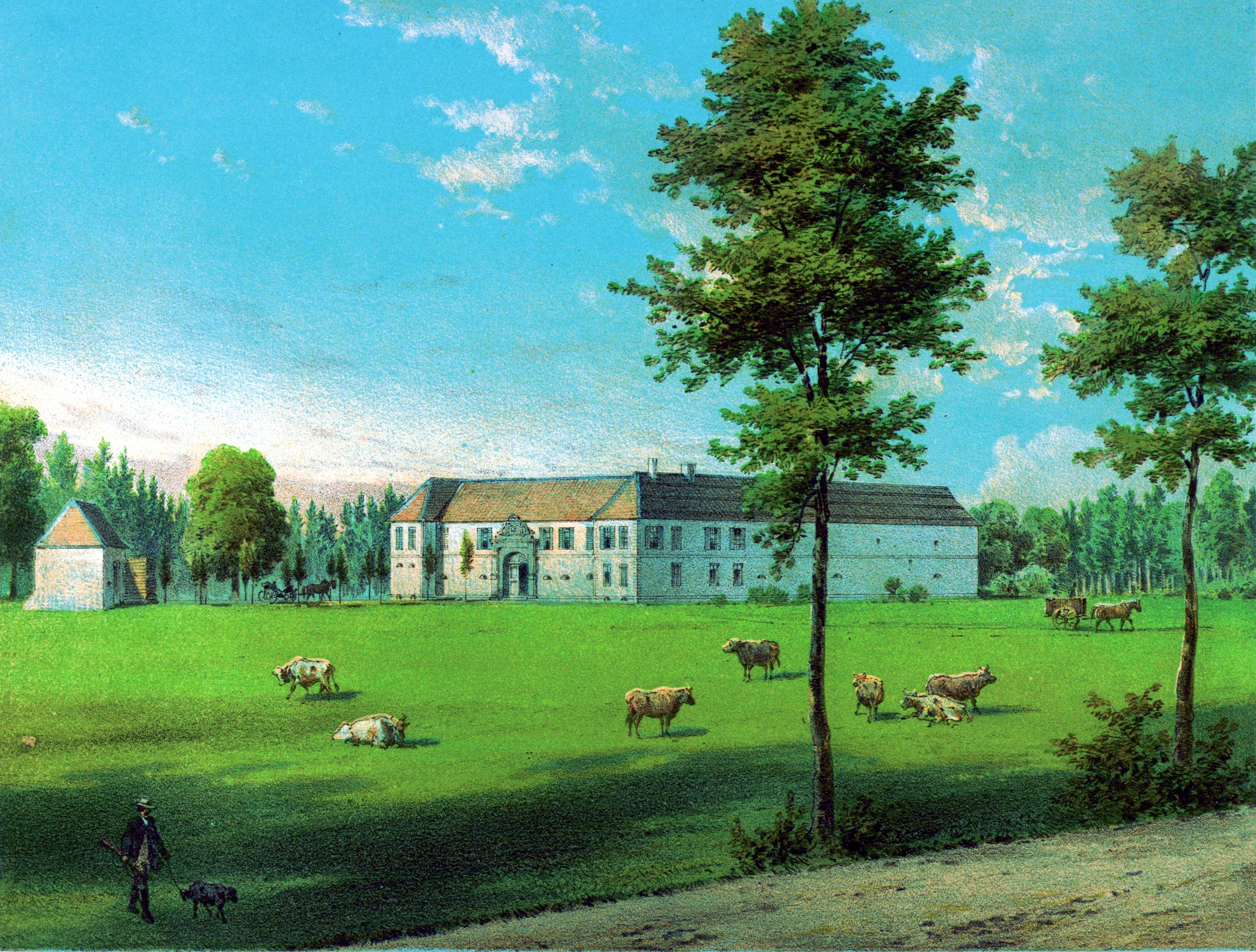
Christian Hohe: Manor house Altenhof

== Main sights ==
The main sights are the Catholic Parish Church St. Clemens, the Protestant Church and the Rokoko Pavillon built in the second half of the 18th century. . The manor house Altenhof was almost 500 years the property of Earl of Spee. The nearby Grenzwald is a popular Recreation area and Nature reserve.

Right at the border there is the Sequoiafarm Kaldenkirchen, a precious Arboretum that has been used as a Biological institute for many years and has much historical interest.

== Notable people ==
- August von Brandis (1862-1947), artist. He spent a lot of time in the garden pavilion of his parents-in-law in Kaldenkirchen.
- Anton van Eyk (1911–2004), artist
- Wilhelm Imkamp (b. 1951), German Catholic prelate
- Illa Martin (1900–1988), dendrologist, botanist, conservationist and dentist
- Leo Peters (born 1944), historian

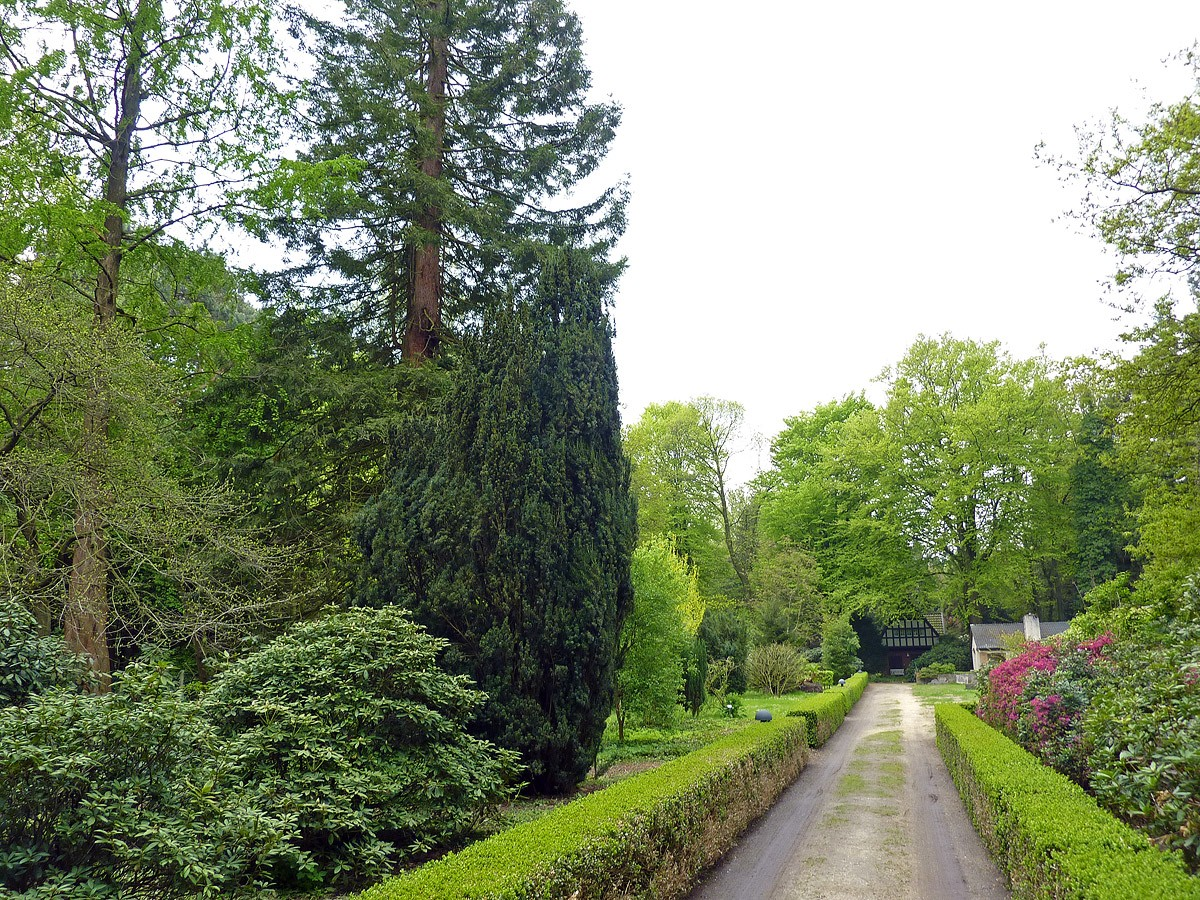
Entrance to Sequoiafarm

== Kaldenkirchen Raceway ==
The village had its own Stock Car circuit which hosted major international events including the Superstox World Championship in 1975, 1978 and 1987. It also staged the first running of the Stock Saloon World Championship on 19 September 1982. The track was closed at the end of the 1987 racing season.
