= Clemens Weiss =

German artist

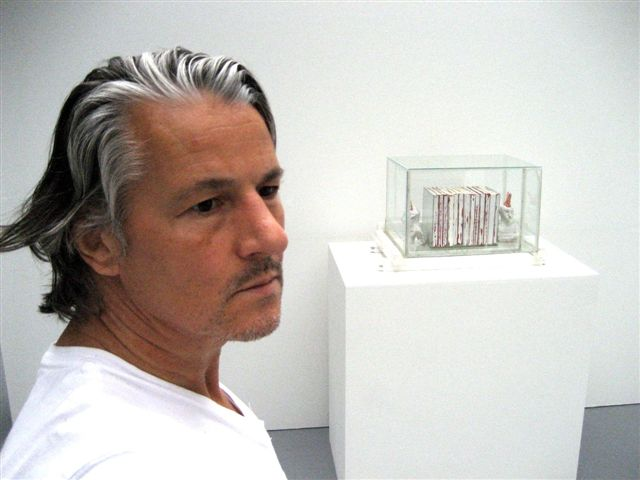
Clemens Weiss

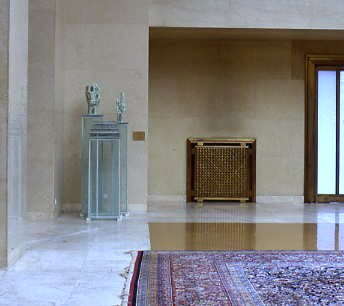
Installation UN-Palais des Nations, Geneva (Switzerland)

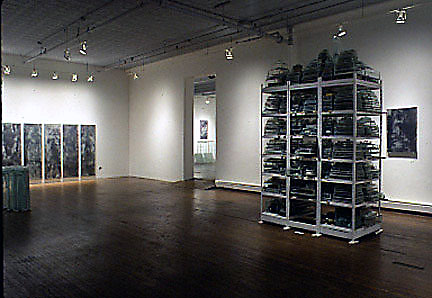
Installation (Ronald Feldman Gallery, NYC)

Clemens Weiss (born 1955) is a German artist living in the United States.

== Youth and Education ==
Clemens Weiss grew up in the Region of the Lower Rhine Valley where he received technical training in mechanical engineering from 1970 to 1973. From 1977 to 1982, he studied art, philosophy, medicine and geology in Krefeld and Düsseldorf (Germany], and Vienna (Austria). Beginning in 1974, he also worked as an independent artist. In 1983 he moved to the small town of Süchteln in Germany in order to concentrate on his own philosophical and visual work. Since 1986 he has maintained a studio in Mönchengladbach in Germany (where he finished and documented his body of work) and, in 1987, moved to New York where he established his main studio and residence.

== Work and Projects ==
Weiss is represented by the Ronald Feldman Gallery in New York and had his first exhibition there in 1988. Since then, he has exhibited in galleries, art foundations and museums, often in conjunction with lectures and panels, and has shown many other art, theater and public sculptural projects in the United States and in Europe. Clemens Weiss has also acted as curator of large transatlantic arts and media projects, including a project for the German publication Juni (which was also published in a New York edition for the occasion), that consisted of an exhibition in Germany of specially-created print editions by New York artists in 1991.

He is engaged in international cultural exchange to oppose the large dangers threatening mankind. His sculpture Regarding Non-Proliferation of Nuclear Weapon was permanently installed in 1996 at the Palace of Nations (UN) in Geneva, as an official present from the Federal Republic of Germany to the United Nations. The sculpture consists of a group of steles with forty-two handwritten texts related to international nuclear treaties and covers the complexity of the nuclear age until 1995, the year the sculpture was finished.

Weiss investigates, and attempts by means of Installation and other groups of works, to bridge the different disciplines of art and philosophy. His installations are transparent glass constructions that often contain drawings, text, paintings, and objects and he uses a similar technique in his theater productions.

Clemens Weiss lives and works in New York City.

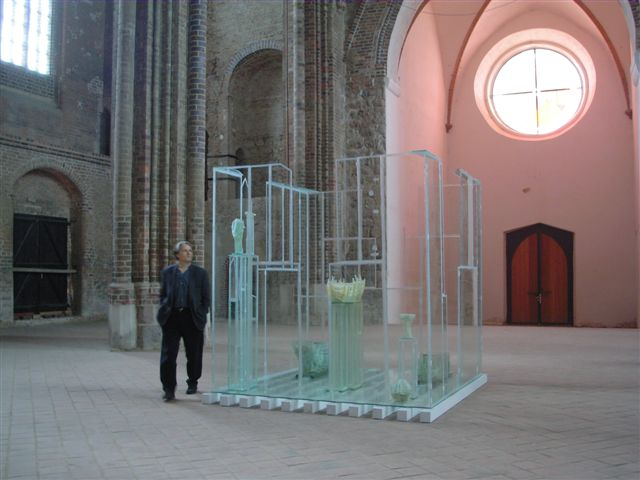
Installation in the St. Marien Church, Prenzlau (2005)

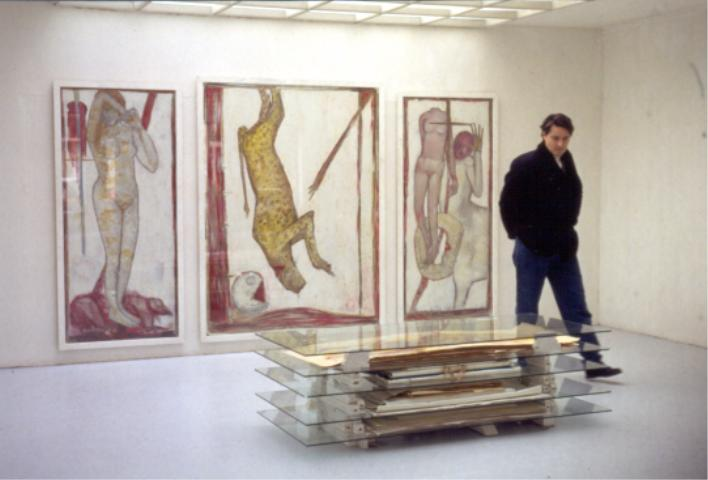
Installation (1990)

== Individual exhibitions (selection) ==
- 2025 kunstraumno.10, Moenchengladbach/Germany
- 2020 Gartenpavillon im Malkasten Park, Duesseldorf/Germany
- 2019 Galerie H1 Hoehr-Grenzhausen/Germany
- 2019 kunstraumno.10, Moenchengladbach/Germany
- 2013 Galerie Kabuth, Gelsenkirchen, (Germany)
- 2012 Leibnitz University, Hanover, (Germany)
- 2011 Galleria Cortina, Milan, (Italy)
- 2011 Museum Kunst Palast, Düsseldorf (Germany)
- 2010 Redline Foundation Milwaukee, Wisconsin
- 2008 Kunstverein Herzogenrath, Germany
- 2007 Ronald Feldman Fine Arts, New York
- 2004 Galerie Bernd Lutze, Friedrichshafen (Germany)
- 2004 kunstraumno.10, Mönchengladbach (Germany)
- 2002 Kunstraum Syltquelle, Sylt
- 1998 Museum Bochum, Bochum (Germany)
- 1996 Palace of Nations, United Nations, Geneva (Switzerland)
- 1994 Galerie Seippel, Cologne (Germany)
- 1992 Neuer Aachener Kunstverein, Aachen (Germany)
- 1989 Josef-Haubrich-Kunsthalle, Cologne
- 1989 Art Cologne, Förderkoje Galerie Lohrl, Cologne (Germany)
- 1989 Anderson Gallery, Virginia Commonwealth University, Richmond (USA)

== Group exhibitions (selection) ==
- 2021 Royal Danish Academy, Bornholm Art Museum and Grønbechs Gård
- 2021 Osthaus Museum, Hagen/Germany
- 2013 Owens Art Gallery, New Brunswick, (Canada)
- 2012 Boulder Museum of Art, Boulder, Colorado
- 2009 RedLine Foundation, Denver/Colorado
- 2008 Kunst: Raum Syltquelle Rantum/Sylt (Germany)
- 2006 Suermond-Ludwig Museum, Aachen (Germany)
- 2005 Glaspalast, Heerlen, (Netherlands)
- 2004 Schick Art Gallery, Skidmore College, Saratoga Springs, NY
- 2001 Folkwang Museum, Essen. (Neuerwerbungen) (Germany)
- 2001 Museum Schloss Morsbroich, Leverkusen. (Darlings) (Germany)
- 2000 Expo 2000, Hannover. (post edition) (Germany)
- 1999 Neue Nationalgalerie, Berlin (Das XX. Jahrhundert – 100 Jahre Kunst in Deutschland)
- 1991 Ludwig Forum für Internationale Kunst, Aachen. (Transzendenz/Transparenz)

== Collections ==
Clemens Weiss has works in the collections of the Museum of Modern Art, Folkwang Museum (Essen), Hamburger Bahnhof (Berlin), New York Public Library (The Spencer Collection), Pushkin Museum (Moscow), Palace of Nations (Geneva), University of South Florida (Art Museum), Von der Heydt Museum (Wuppertal, Germany) and Wadsworth Atheneum, Hartford (USA).
