= Kaldenkirchen Sequoia Farm =

Arboretum in Lower Rhine region of Germany

Coordinates: 51°18′32″N 6°10′20″E

Kaldenkirchen Sequoia Farm (Sequoiafarm Kaldenkirchen)
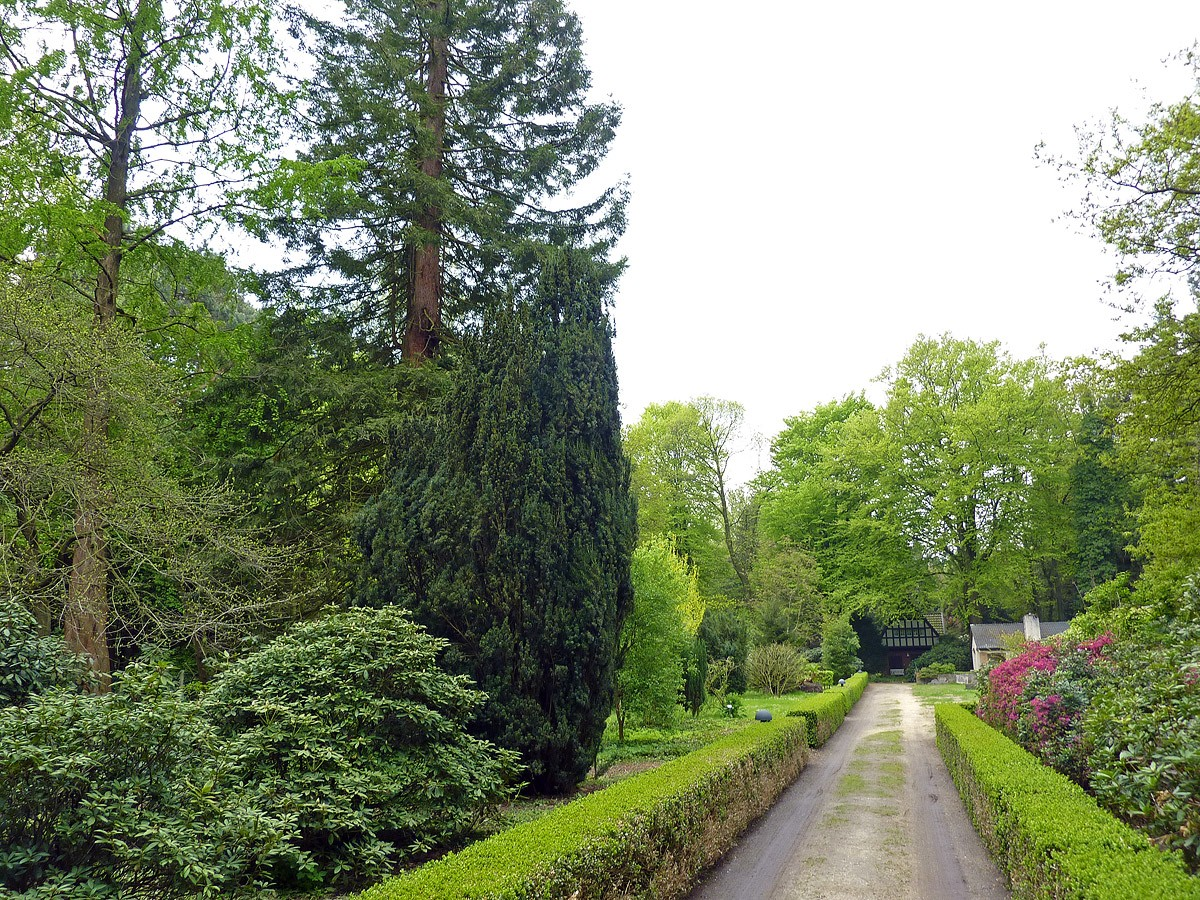
- Entrance to the Sequoia Farm
- Interactive map of Kaldenkirchen Sequoia Farm (Sequoiafarm Kaldenkirchen)
- Type: Arboretum
- Location: Nettetal, Germany
- Area: 3.5 hectares (8.6 acres)
- Created: 1950
- Operator: Society Sequoiafarm e.V.
- Open: April to October on Sundays and holidays
- Website: Sequoiafarm

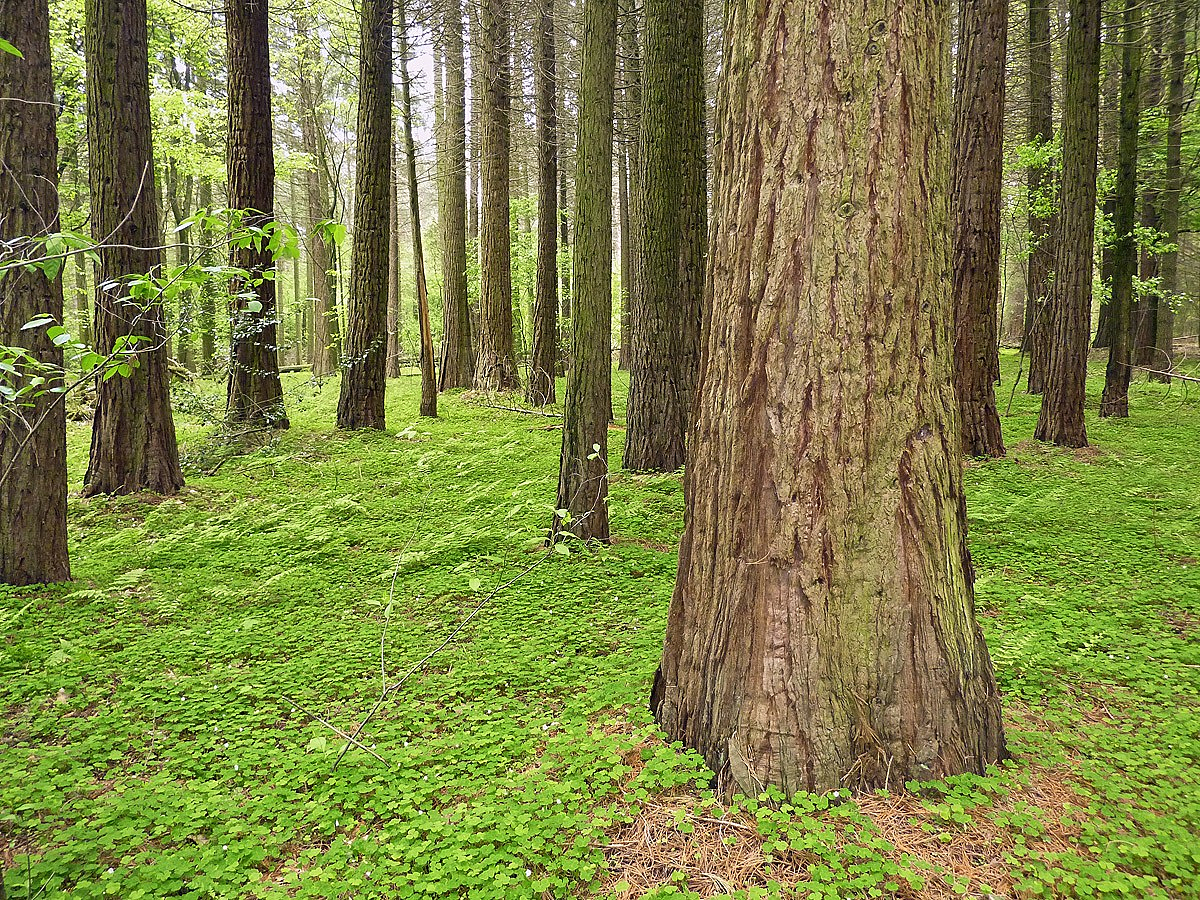
60-year-old stock of Sequoiadendron giganteum in a test site (2010)

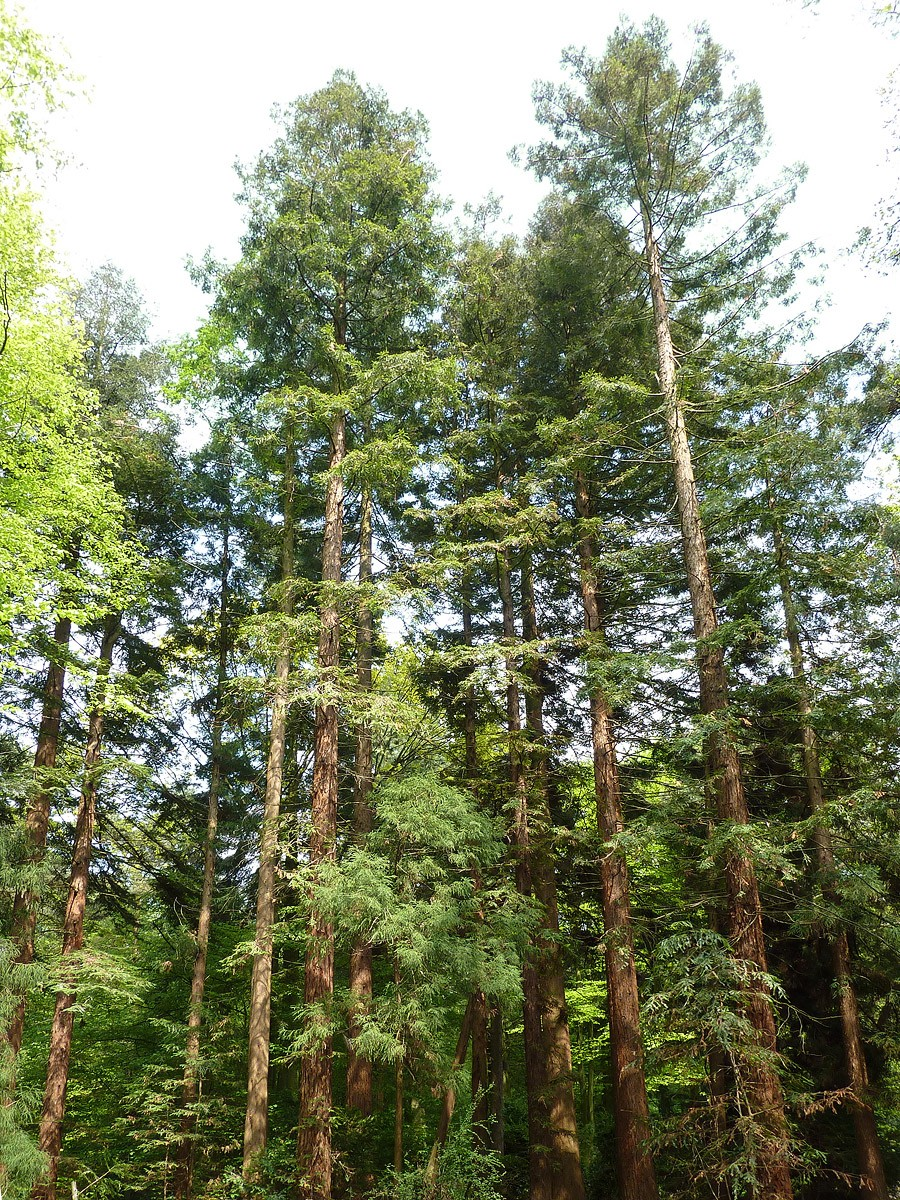
58-year-old group of Sequoia sempervirens within the Sequoiafarm (2010)

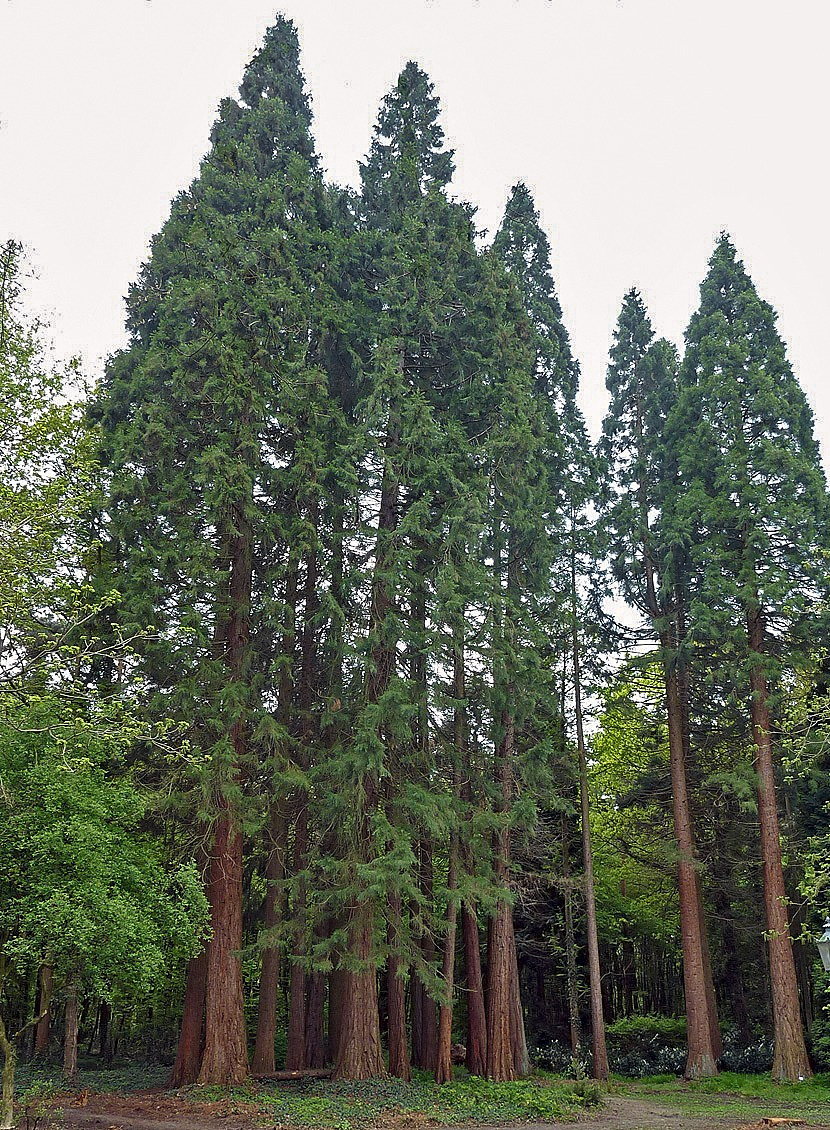
Sequoiadendron giganteum in the Sequoiafarm

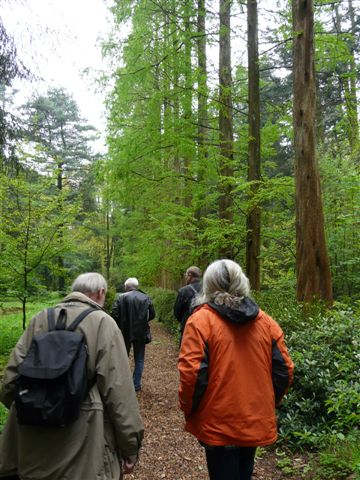
Visiting the dawn redwoods

The Kaldenkirchen Sequoia Farm (German: Sequoiafarm Kaldenkirchen) is a German arboretum that has been used as a biological institute for many years. Part of the protected area in the city of Nettetal, it is situated in the "Kaldenkirchen Grenzwald" (forest bordering Germany and the Netherlands). Nettetal lies in the Lower Rhine region of Germany.

== History and use ==
In 1946, Illa Martin and Ernst J. Martin, both dentists and dendrologists in Kaldenkirchen, founded an arboretum close to the Dutch border. There, and in a nearby laboratory-plantation several acres wide from 1952 on, they cultivated 1,500 giant sequoia (Sequoiadendron giganteum) seedlings from seeds of US origin from Martin's nephew Albert A. Martin of Santa Barbara, CA. The seeds were collected in Sequoia National Forest at different elevations, wrapped in burlap to preserve them and sent to Germany. They wanted to find out if the giant sequoia, which had existed in Germany before the ice age, could be introduced to German forestry. There was on the one hand an area of purely giant sequoia, on the other an experimental arboretum with trees such as Abies grandis, Abies concolor var. lowiana and Coast Douglas-firs. The project was financially supported by the German Research Foundation and met with great interest from dendrological circles, particularly in Great Britain and in the USA. Part of the field exclusively planted with giant sequoia was reserved for obtaining results of productivity by the "Ecology and Forestry Department" of North Rhine-Westphalia (NRW).

The two dendrologists made further experiments growing seedlings of coast redwood, dawn redwood and numerous kinds of southern beeches and pine trees. More than 13,000 were handed over to forestry officers, to scientists and to plant nurseries. As time went by, the park known as the "Sequoia Farm" became bigger and bigger, developing into a highly respected arboretum. It has more than 400 varieties of trees and interesting ground flora and is part of the "Protected area of Maas-Schwalm-Nette", so-called after the three rivers that run through the area.

After the death of Ernst J. Martin in 1967, North Rhine-Westphalia (NRW) took over the farm. At first, the teacher-training institute of NRW, later on the University of Cologne, and, between 1987 and 2007, the University of Duisburg-Essen made it a centre of dendrological studies. Since 2013 the arboretum has been in possession of the registered society "Sequoiafarm e.V.". From April to October it is open to the public on Sundays and holidays.

== Notable trees (selection) ==
Binomial nomenclature	English name	Country of origin
Acer runifere	Redvein Maple, Honshū Maple	Japan
Abies concolor	Sierra Nevada White Fir	Western North America
Abies grandis	Grand Fir, Giant Fir	Western North America
Ailanthus altissima	Tree of heaven	China, Taiwan
Calocedrus decurrens	California incense cedar	Western North America
Cercidiphyllum japonicum	Katsura	China, Japan
Gunnera manicata	Gunnera manicata	South Brasilia
Magnolia kobus	Kobushi Magnolia	Japan
Nothofagus obliqua (the largest specimen in Germany)	Roble beech	Chile, Argentina
Parrotia persica	Persian ironwood	Northern Iran
Pinus ayacahuite (the largest specimen in Germany)	Mexican White Pine	Mexico, Central America
Sequoia sempervirens	Coast redwood	Western North America
Sequoiadendron giganteum	Giant sequoia	California
Thuja plicata	Western redcedar	British Columbia
Tsuga sieboldii	Southern Japanese Hemlock	Japan
Wollemia nobilis	Wollemia	Australia
Zanthoxylum simulans	Japanese pepper	Japan

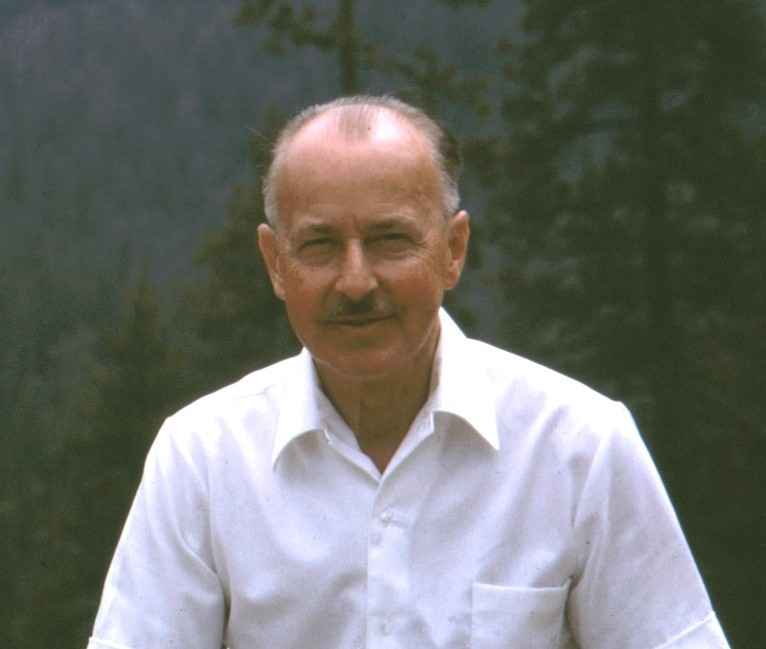
Ernst J. Martin (1900–1967), founder of the farm

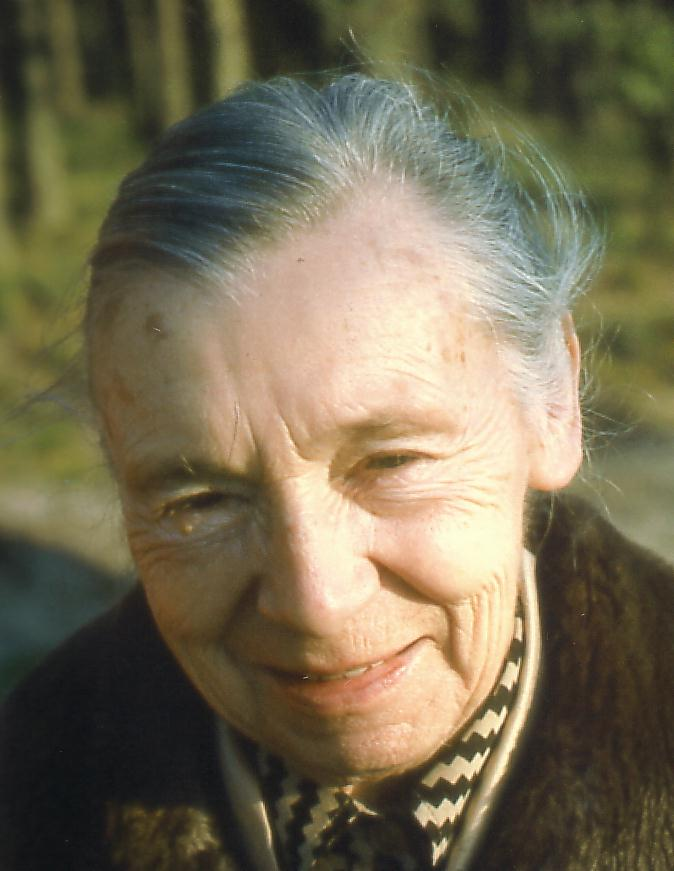
Illa Martin (1900–1988), co-founder of the farm
