= Crimson =

Strong, bright, deep reddish purple color

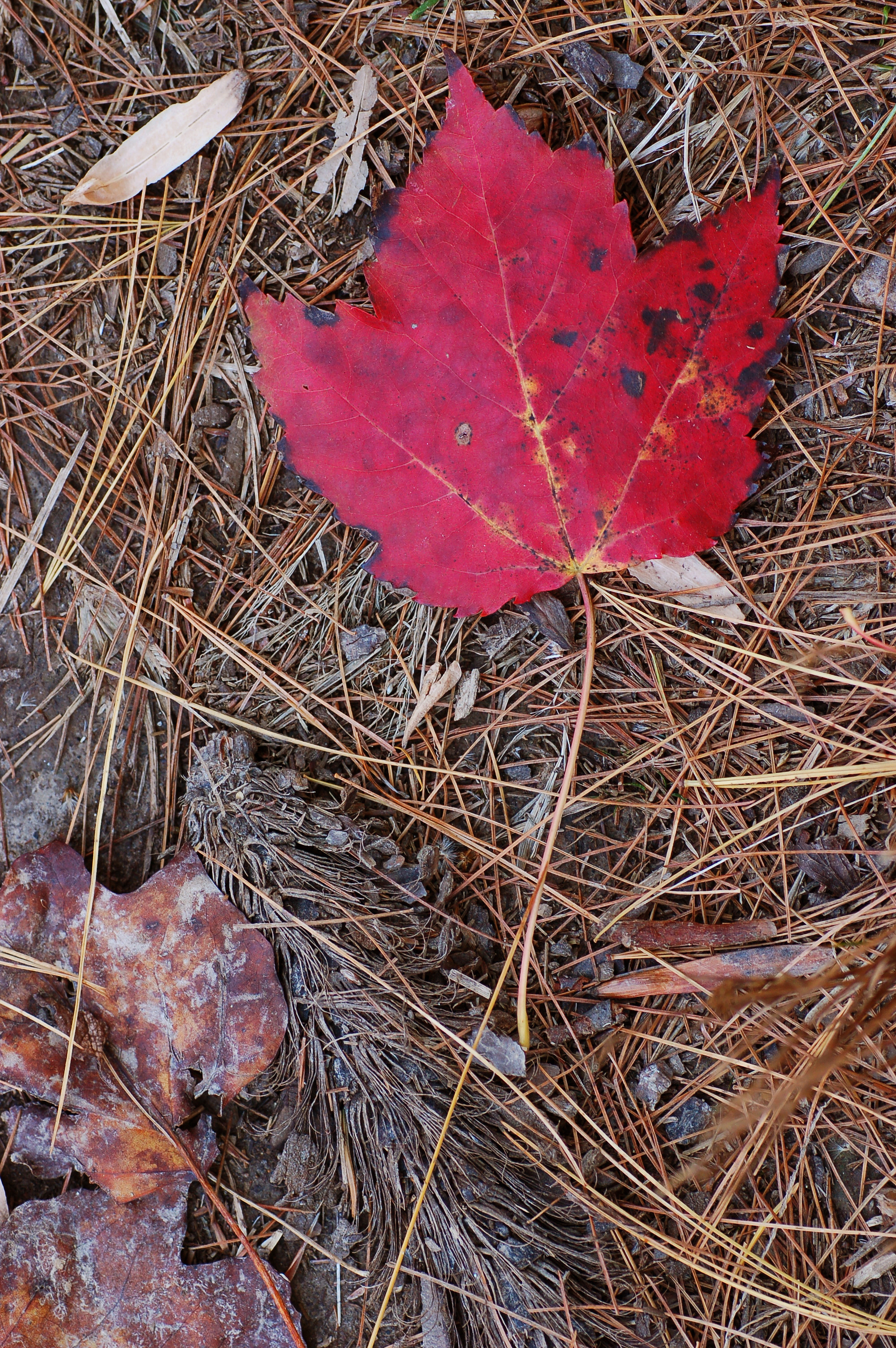
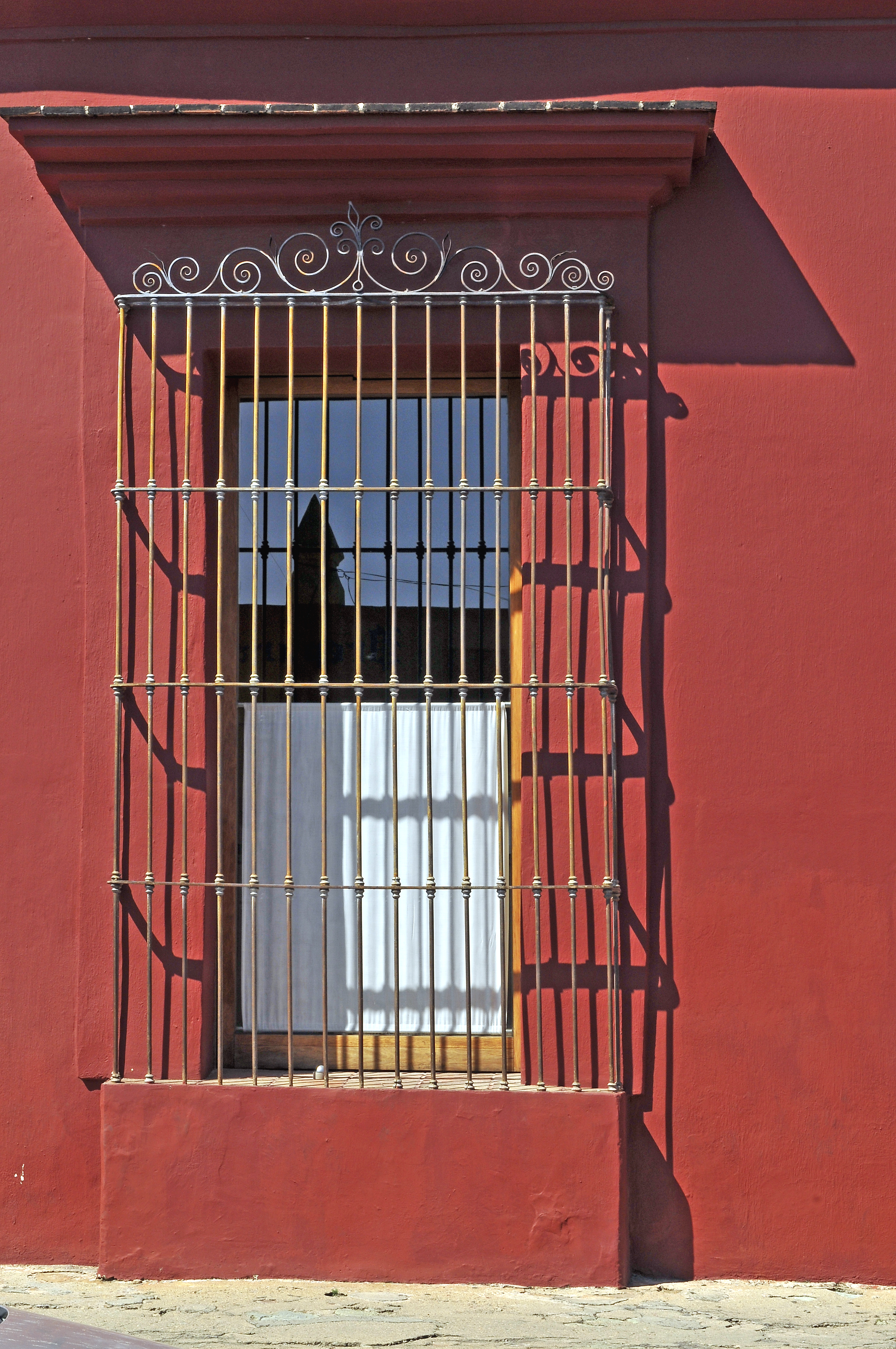
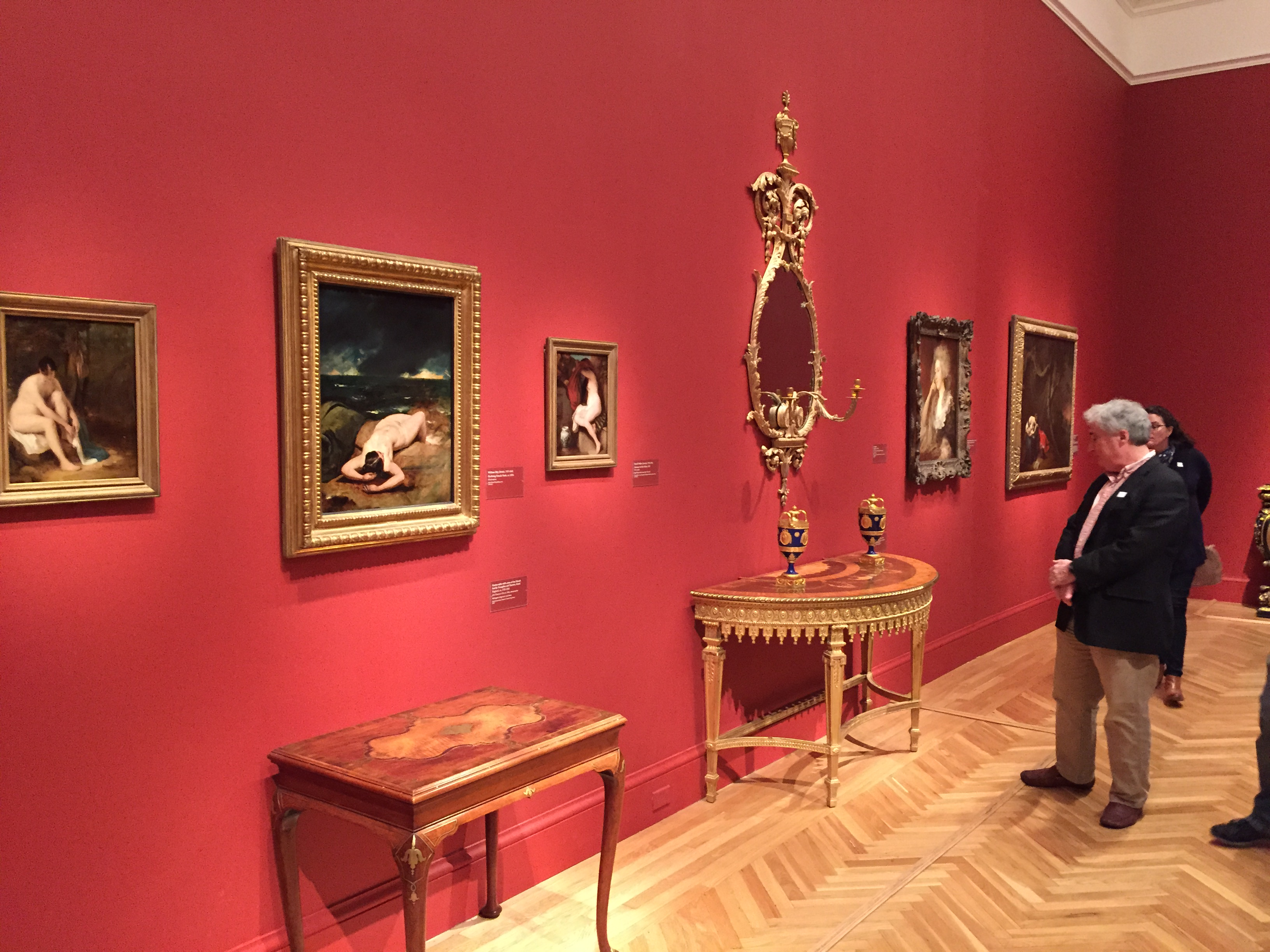
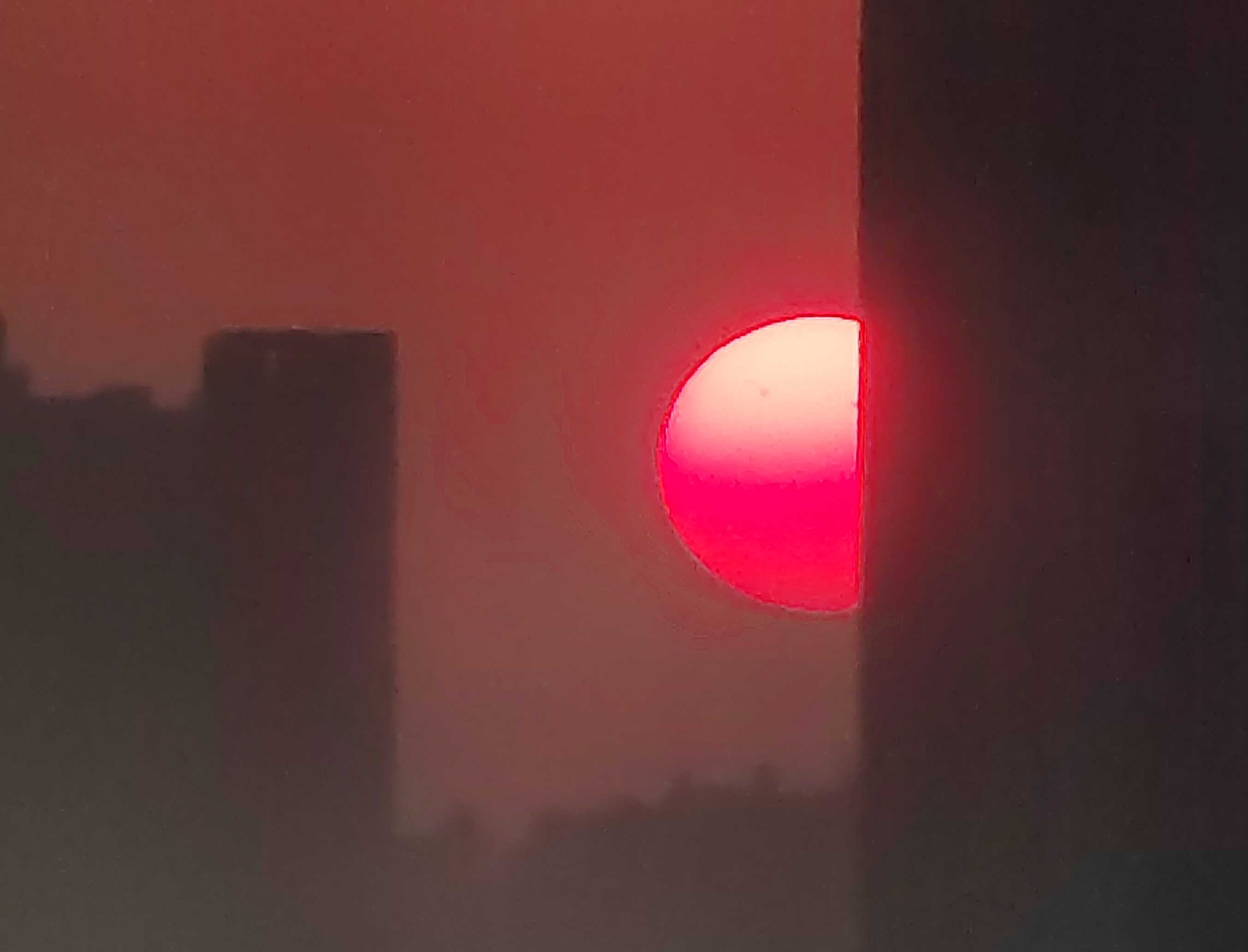
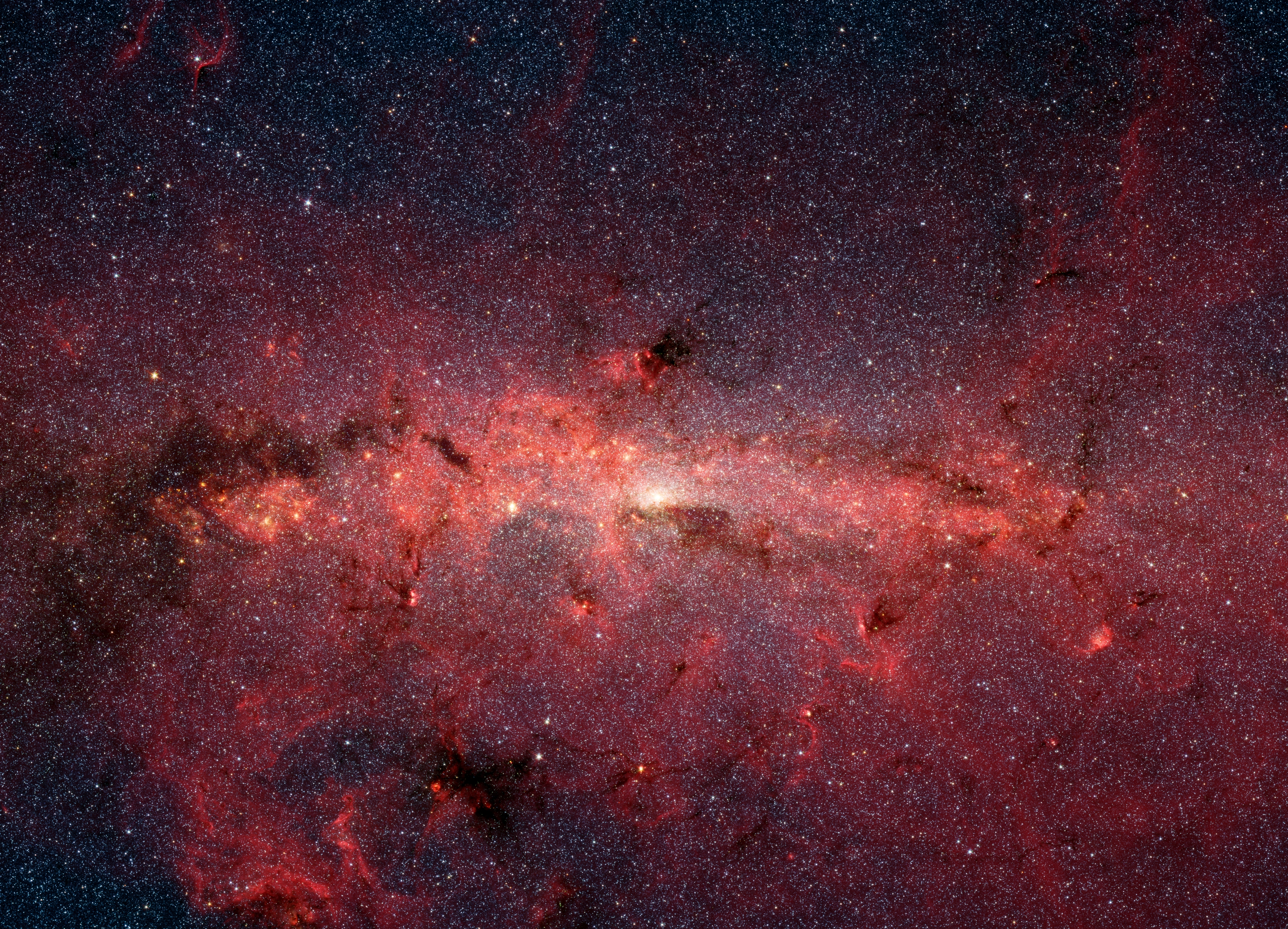
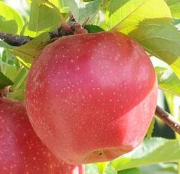
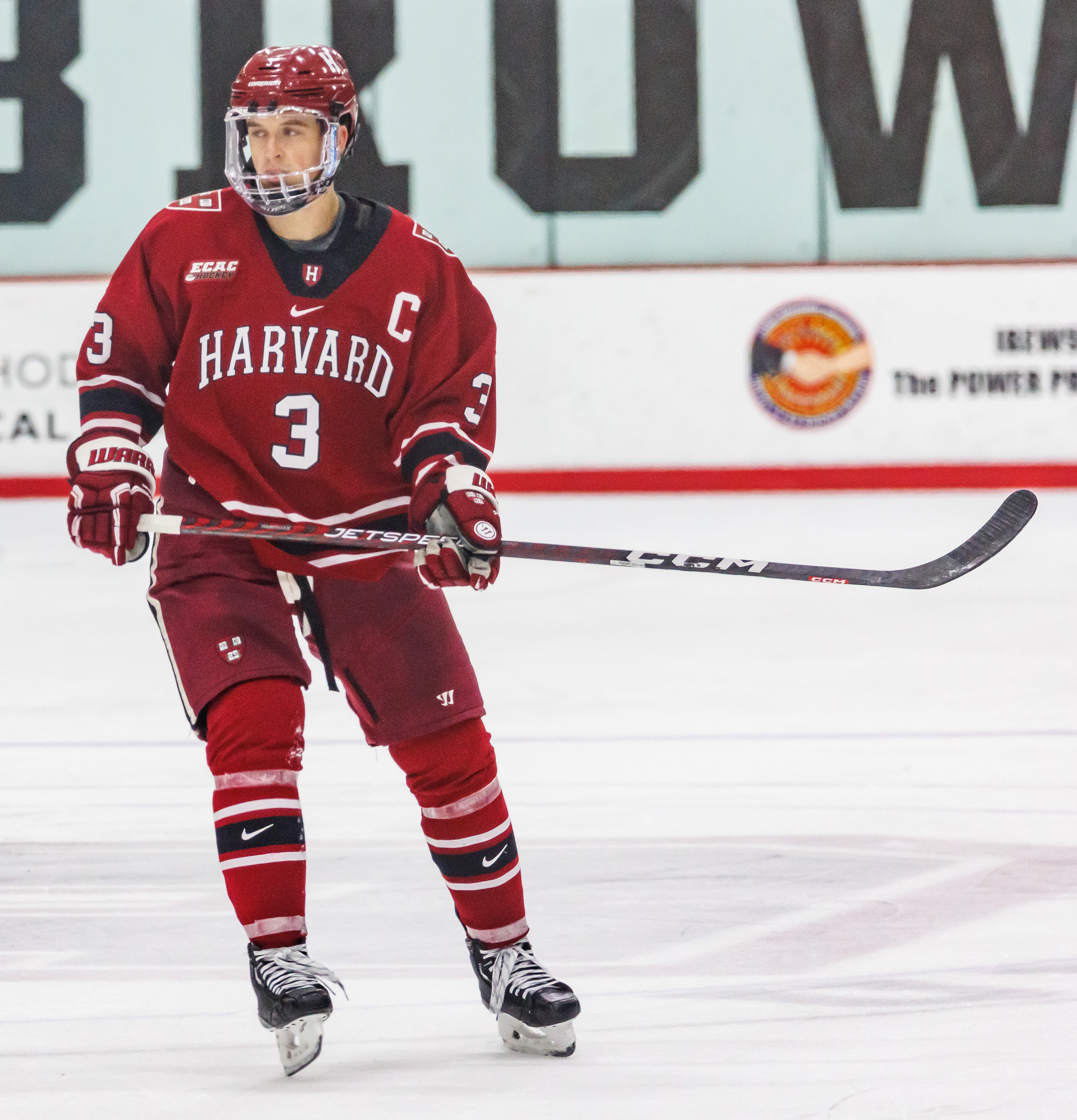
- Clockwise, from top left: Dropped maple leaf; Facade of a house in Oaxaca de Juárez; The Milky Way; Henry Thrun playing for the Harvard Crimson; Crimson Delight apple; California Palace of the Legion of Honor; Sunset over Wuhan.

Color coordinates
- Hex triplet: #DC143C
- sRGB^{B} (r, g, b): (220, 20, 60)
- HSV (h, s, v): (348°, 91%, 86%)
- CIELCh_{uv} (L, C, h): (47, 140, 8°)
- Source: HTML/CSS
- ISCC–NBS descriptor: Vivid red
- B: Normalized to [0–255] (byte)

Crimson is a rich, deep red color, inclining to purple. It originally meant the color of the kermes dye produced from a scale insect, Kermes vermilio, but the name is now sometimes also used as a generic term for slightly bluish-red colors that are between red and rose. It is the national color of Nepal.

== History ==
Crimson (NR4) is produced using the dried bodies of a scale insect, Kermes, which were gathered commercially in Mediterranean countries, where they live on the kermes oak, and sold throughout Europe. Kermes dyes have been found in burial wrappings in Anglo-Scandinavian York. They fell out of use with the introduction of carmine, also made from scale insects, because although the dyes were comparable in quality and color intensity, ten to twelve times as much kermes is needed to produce the same effect as carmine.

In Europe, cochineal dyes from the Western Hemisphere replaced kermes dyes from the Mediterranean during the Columbian exchange in the 15th century, as cochineal dyes are more potent. Crimson was one of the insect-dye shades of red that was popularized during the Renaissance.

Carmine is a slightly different shade of red, extracted from a different insect (female cochineal), although these denominations are sometimes confused or exchanged on purpose. Cochineal appears to have been brought to Europe by the Spaniard Hernán Cortés during the conquest of the Aztec Empire and the name 'carmine' is derived from the French carmin. It was first described by Pietro Andrea Mattioli in 1549. The pigment is also called cochineal after the insect from which it is made.

Alizarin crimson was invented in 1868. Alizarin (PR83) is a pigment that was first synthesized in 1868 by the German chemists Carl Gräbe and Carl Liebermann and replaced the natural pigment madder lake. Alizarin crimson is a dye bonded onto alum which is then used as a pigment and mixed with ochre, sienna and umber. It is not totally colorfast.

Several historical color models have described crimson as a basic color:

- Aristotle listed phoinikoun as one of the basic colors, which is customarily translated as crimson. He described it as having harmony with the color purple in his Sense and Sensibilia.
- The 1708 edition of Traité de la Peinture en Mignature listed crimson red as a secondary color made up of red and blue, which is used to create other colors. It is listed alongside fire red, which mixes red and yellow.
- Entomologist Ignaz Schiffermüller included crimson red in his 12-color color wheel in 1772. He placed it between red and violet red, with fire red included on the other side of red.
- Physicist Thomas Young listed crimson as one of seven basic colors in 1807, distinguishing it from red.
- Printing technologist Frederic Eugene Ives defined the color as the opposite of green in 1902, naming it "minus green".
- Art historian Arthur Upham Pope described alizarine crimson as well as rose madder as the ideal pigment for a basic red in 1929.

Cochineal dyes are commonly used in modern consumer products, including food, medicines, and cosmetics.

=== Three-color photography ===
In three-color photography, crimson can be used to contrast with dark green. Edward John Wall of the American Photographic Publishing Company grouped crimson—defined as equivalent to pink and magenta—with peacock blue and yellow for three-color photography as the best way to produce images with black and gray. He cited Arthur von Hübl, who grouped crimson with yellow and blue-green, which results in vermilion, violet-blue, and green. Color scientist J. C. Arch suggested using alizarin crimson with chrome yellow, Prussian blue, and ultramarine blue for a subtractive process in three-color photography.

Early photography scientists A. J. Newton and A. J. Bull described "light crimson" as one of the six colors used in gradation of photographic plates in three-color photography as the contrast to dark green. They warned that green ink records poorly relative to the other colors because of its low luminosity, and that crimson ink will print on green more than it does on white. This degrades the green if it is not equally recorded with white.

== Etymology ==
Crimson is a type of red. English dictionaries define crimson as a deep red, a rich red, or a purplish red. Adobe defines crimson as a near-pink that is lighter than shades of red like carmine or burgundy.

The word crimson refers to the kermes insect used to create the kermes dye. It comes from the Arabic word for the kermes insect, which was adapted to Medieval Latin and then Middle English, where it referred to both the insect and the dye c. 1400.

Earlier forms include cremesin, crymysyn and cramoysin (cf. cramoisy, a crimson cloth). These were adapted via Old Spanish from the Medieval Latin cremesinus (also kermesinus or carmesinus), the dye produced from Kermes scale insects, and can be traced back to Arabic qirmizi (قرمزي) ("red") [qrmzj], also borrowed in Turkic languages kırmız and many other languages, e.g. German Karmesin, Italian cremisi, French cramoisi, Portuguese carmesim, Dutch karmozijn, etc. (via Latin). The ultimate source from Classical Persian کرمست (kirmist), from Middle Persian; Proto-Indo-Iranian *kŕ̥miš. Cognate with Sanskrit कृमिज (kṛmija). Doublet of kermes; also see carmine. A shortened form of carmesinus also gave the Latin carminus, from which comes carmine.

Other cognates include the Persian ghermez "red" derived from "kermest" the red worm, Old Church Slavonic чрьвл҄ѥнъ (črьvl'enъ), archaic Russian чермный (čermnyj), Bulgarian червен (cherven), and Serbo-Croatian crven "red". Cf. also vermilion.

== Connotations ==
The connotations of crimson are similar to those of the color red. In descriptive writing, crimson is sometimes used to emphasize the color red in a more intense usage and invoke a stronger emotional connotation. Crimson is used in art to draw attention.

Crimson is sometimes used to describe the color of blood. Crimson sometimes described the color of blushing, though brighter reds such as scarlet may also be used in this context.

Crimson is associated with passionate emotions like love, hate, anger, and revenge. The color can be used negatively to describe anger or malice. It may alternatively be associated with style or class, especially in the context of fashion or interior design.

Adobe describes crimson as Victorian when paired with bronze or maroon, or autumnal when paired with brown or gold.

== Dyes ==
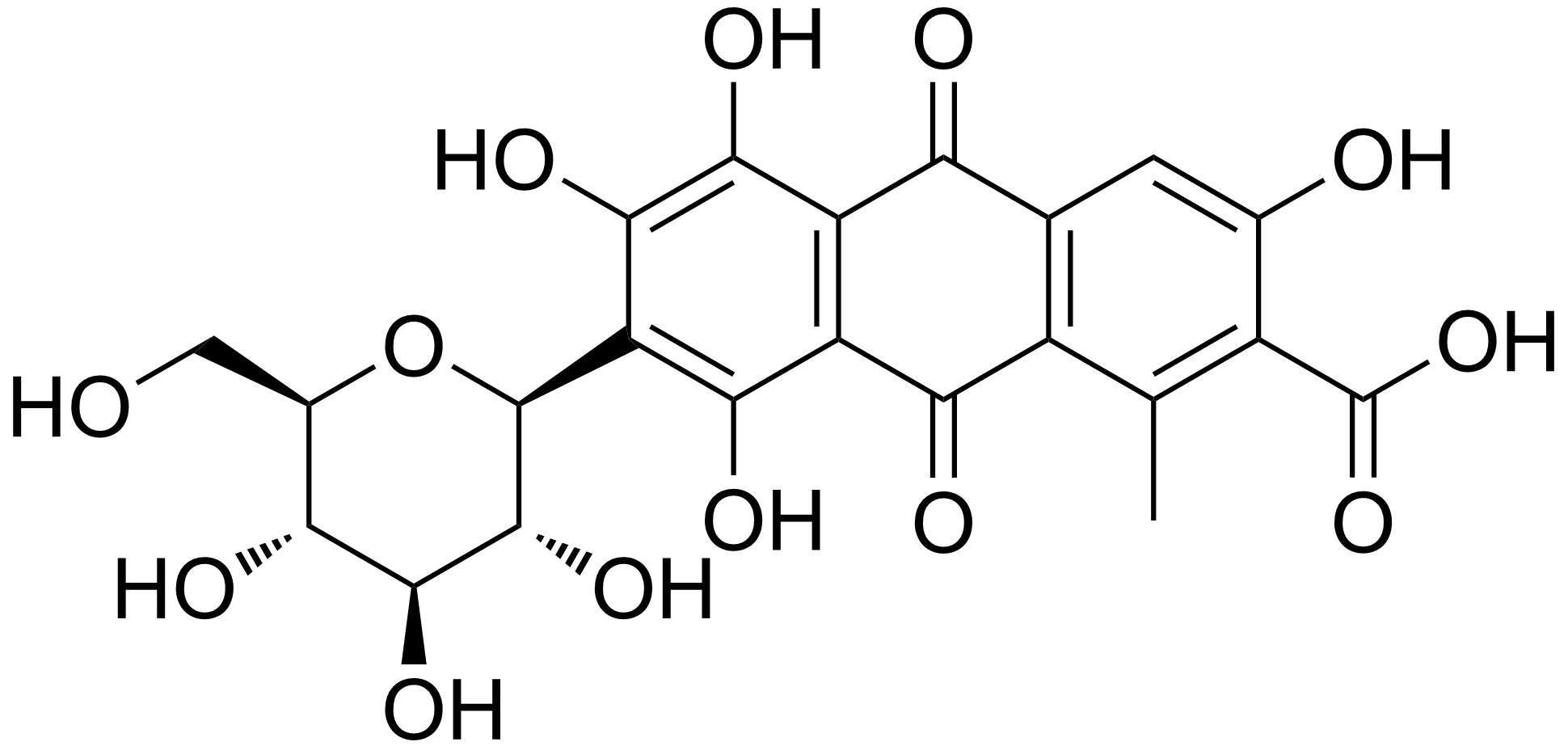
Carminic acid

Carmine dyes, which give crimson and related red and purple colors, are based on an aluminium and calcium salt of carminic acid. Carmine lake is an aluminium or aluminium-tin lake of cochineal extract, and crimson lake is prepared by striking down an infusion of cochineal with a 5 percent solution of alum and cream of tartar. Purple lake is prepared like carmine lake with the addition of lime to produce the deep purple tone. Carmine dyes tend to fade quickly.

Crimson dye is made from the same insects as carmine and vermillion.

Carmine dyes were once widely prized in both the Americas and in Europe. They were used in paints by Michelangelo and for the crimson fabrics of the Hussars, the Turks, the British Redcoats, and the Royal Canadian Mounted Police.

Nowadays carmine dyes are used for coloring foodstuffs, medicines and cosmetics. As a food additive in the European Union, carmine dyes are designated E120, and are also called cochineal and Natural Red 4. Carmine dyes are also used in some oil paints and watercolors used by artists.

Erythrosine can produce crimson in three-color photography through dry erythrosine collodion. Using erythrosine instead of carmine ensures that the image results in vermilion instead of orange when combined with yellow.

== In nature ==
- The crimson tide which sometimes occurs on beaches is caused by a type of algae known as Karenia brevis.

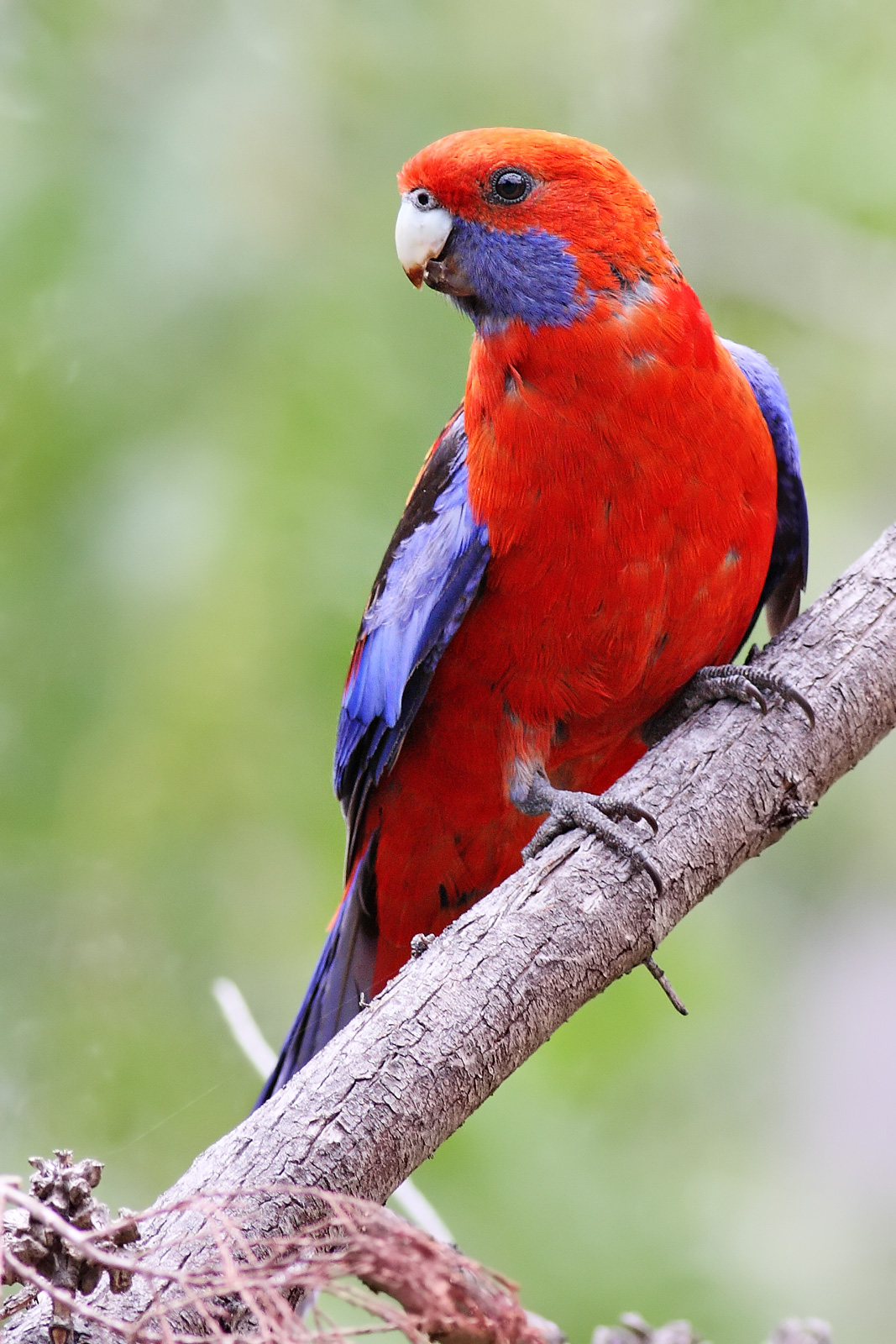
Crimson rosella

- Crimson rosellas are a subspecies of parrot that are common in Australia.
- The crimson sunbird is the national bird of Singapore.
- The crimson-breasted gonolek is an African bushshrike with a bright crimson breast.
- Crimson clover (Trifolium incarnatum) is a clover species native to Europe
- Crimson glory vine (Vitis coignetiae) is a vine species native to Asia
- Hind's Crimson Star is an alternative name of the deep orange-red variable star R Leporis

== In culture ==
Crimson (UA)

Color coordinates
- Hex triplet: #9E1B32
- sRGB^{B} (r, g, b): (158, 27, 50)
- HSV (h, s, v): (349°, 83%, 62%)
- CIELCh_{uv} (L, C, h): (35, 91, 7°)
- ISCC–NBS descriptor: Vivid red
- B: Normalized to [0–255] (byte)

In Polish, karmazyn (crimson) is a synonym for a magnate, i.e., a member of the rich, high nobility as only they may wear robing dyed from the scale insect.

The artist Michelangelo frequently used crimson for his reds.

In scriptures of the Baháʼí Faith, crimson stands for tests and sacrifice, among other things.

Crimson is used by several militaries, including the United States Army Ordnance Corps, the British King's Royal Hussars, the ceremonial uniform of the Danish Guard Hussar Regiment, and the historical British Redcoats.

Crimson is a common color for universities like Harvard University and the University of Alabama, and for American Greek letter organizations like Kappa Alpha Order and Kappa Alpha Psi.

Crimson is the national color of Nepal, and it appears on the flags of Nepal and Poland.

== See also ==
- Alizarin crimson (color)
- List of colors
  - Amaranth (color)
  - Carmine (color)
  - Ruby (color)
  - Scarlet
- Kermes (dye)
- National symbols of Nepal
- Red dye insects:
  - Armenian cochineal
  - Polish cochineal
