= Alizarin crimson (color) =

Shade of red

Alizarin Crimson

Color coordinates
- Hex triplet: #E32636
- sRGB^{B} (r, g, b): (227, 38, 54)
- HSV (h, s, v): (355°, 83%, 89%)
- CIELCh_{uv} (L, C, h): (49, 142, 10°)
- Source: ColorHexa
- ISCC–NBS descriptor: Vivid reddish orange
- B: Normalized to [0–255] (byte)

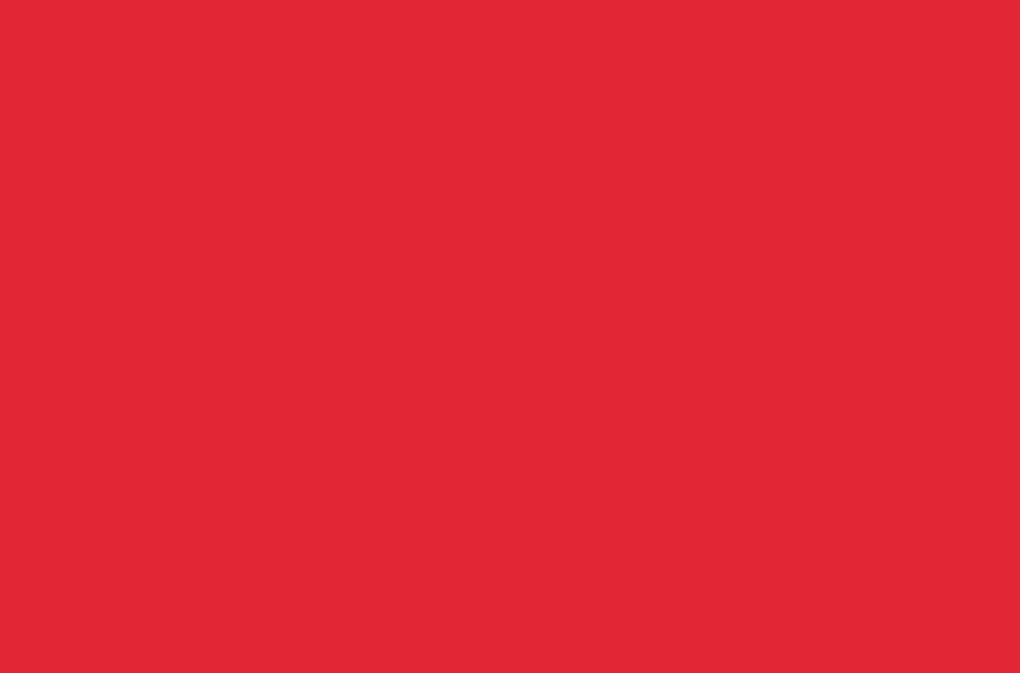
Alizarin Crimson(color)

Alizarin crimson is a deep red color with a blue undertone. It is named after the organic dye alizarin, found in the madder plant, and the related synthetic lake pigment alizarin crimson (PR83 in the Color Index).

== History ==
Alizarin crimson can create a wide range of rich, permanent purples and browns. The dye was prominently used for dyeing clothes and traces were found in Ancient Egypt, Persia and the ruins of Pompeii. By the seventh century BC, the dye had been made into a lake pigment and was used across Europe, the Middle East and Asia. By this time the use of madder dye and pigment were widespread, but they remained costly and time-consuming to produce.

William Henry Perkin had co-discovered a way to synthesize the pigment alizarin, which became known as the color alizarin crimson. Its consistency and lightfastness quickly made it a favourite red pigment for artists.

In 1826, French chemists Jean-Jacques Colin and Pierre Jean Robiquet advanced the study of madder by isolating two distinct dyes: alizarin and purpurin. Subsequently, in 1869, German chemists Carl Gräbe and Carl Liebermann distilled alizarin with zinc, resulting in the discovery of anthraquinone.

== In culture ==
Alizarin crimson was a popular color Bob Ross used on his show The Joy of Painting.

== See also ==
#E32636

Alizarin Crimson
#E32636

- Madder
- Alizarin
- Crimson
- Lists of colours
- Shades of red
