= Alizarin crimson =

Alizarin crimson may refer to:

- Alizarin crimson (color), a particular shade of red
- Alizarin, a paint pigment

== See also ==
- Rose madder
