= Silk Road Fashion =

German interdisciplinary research project

Silk Road Fashion is an interdisciplinary research project whose purpose is to investigate communication through clothing during the 1st millennium BC in East Central Asia. Understanding is sought about technology and body understanding, social structures, resource availability, economic history, and trade routes in East Central Asia from ca. 1200 BC to 300 AD. The project is one component of the "Language of Objects" (Sprache der Objekte) priority funding category of the German Federal Ministry of Education and Research.

Interest in the project intensified with the discovery in 2014 of the world's oldest-known trousers.

== Project partners ==
The German project partners are the German Archaeological Institute, the Saxony-Anhalt Department of Historic Monument Preservation and Archaeology, the State Museum of Prehistory in Halle, several institutes of Martin Luther University of Halle-Wittenberg and of Free University of Berlin, the Institute of Zoo and Wild Animal Research of the Leibniz Association, and the Berlin-Brandenburg Academy of Sciences and Humanities.

The Chinese project partners are the Chinese Academy of Cultural Heritage and the Monument Preservation Office of the Xinjiang Uyghur Autonomous Region. The cooperation agreement was signed on 11 April 2013.

== Methodology ==
Research and excavation concentrates on two sites containing graves dating over several centuries. The excavations, typically lasting decades, are to be integrated into the current state of research with the help of an interdisciplinary team. Collaboration with different institutions makes multi-layered research possible by combining the methodologies of archaeology, textile and leather research, dye, weaving and style analysis, ornament research, paleopathology, vegetation study, climate research, and linguistics. Twenty complete outfits including about 100 individual artifacts and objects found in the Turpan and Hami regions will be studied.

The following questions are being addressed: When was this clothing worn? Who wore which clothing? When was it produced? Are there gender, age, or social-class-related characteristics? Were there specific fashions for individual groups? What conclusions can be drawn from the clothing about the geoclimatic situation and the trade routes of the time?

The analysis includes a comparison with neighboring regions, specifically with the Pazyryk culture in the Altai Mountains, the graves of Xiongnu nomads in Mongolia, Chinese textiles and style models, and Greco-Roman portrayals of clothing and accessories.

== Research results ==
Graves containing up to 3000 years old textiles have been found in the autonomous Uygur region of Xinjiang, located in the Turpan oasis in northwestern China. At that time, nomadic pastoral farming was spreading out in Asia. Increasing extreme aridity ensured natural conservation. A pair of woven wool trousers some 3,200 years old, consisting of two legs and a stepped gusset, has since early 2014 been oldest known trousers. Researchers have determined that the material was not cut to size but woven custom fit for each individual. Based on the other grave relics like typical weapons and bridles, the assumption is that these trousers were worn by horseback riders. This is also suggested by the wide crotch gusset, which allows the rider to easily sit astride a horse.

Clothing artifacts from the 7th to 3rd century BC could be assigned to groups of herders who either dwelt there or had migrated into the area. Finds dating later, from the 3rd to 1st century BC, show the clear influence of migrants and travelers from China, the Greco-Roman world, Parthia, Sogdia, and the Kushan Empire in Saka city states at the southern border of the Tarim Basin, confirming already-suspected contacts and trade routes. The Greeks advanced eastward, the Chinese westward, trade prospered and assured frequent contact among these ethnic groups. The beginnings of these contacts and the mutual influence can be identified in their clothing.

Analysis of the fibers and dyes revealed the use of alizarin, purpurin, rubiadin, quinizarin, indigo and indirubin. Locally grown madder was primarily used for the red shades; indigo for the blue shades was probably imported. This is not only evidence of trade, but also of one of the oldest scientifically confirmed uses of madder and indigo to dye textiles in the Xinjiang region.

Material analysis and documentation of finds help in the development of methodologies as well as conservation and restoration measures for the physical preservation of cultural heritage in Xinjiang and the improvement of its virtual availability worldwide.

National history insights come not only from studying the burial grounds themselves, but also from the associated discovery of dwellings, Buddhist cloister and temple buildings, stupas, streets, workshops, irrigation systems, city walls, and nearby gardens and fields. Primary data of unprecedented quality and quantity are being obtained from studying the outfits of individuals, their climatic environment, and texts in local languages.

Starting in 2017, teaching material, six dissertations, several museum exhibitions, and an international fashion show presenting the effect of the clothing on a moving body will be produced.

== Literature ==
- Academia Turfanica Xinjiang, Xinjiang Institute of Cultural Relics and Archaeology, Excavation on the Yanghai Cemetery in Shanshan (Piqan) County, Xinjiang. Kaogu Xuebao 2011, 1: 99–150.
- Bunker E.C., "The cemetery at Shanpula, Xinjiang. Simple burials, complex textiles". In: Keller D., Schorta R. (ed.), Fabulous creatures from the desert sands. Central Asian woolen textiles from the second century BC to the second century AD (Riggisberger Berichte 10). Riggisberg: Abegg-Stiftung 2001: 15–45.
- Hulsewé A.F.P., "China in Central Asia: The early stage: 125 BC- AD 23". An annotated translation of chapters 61 and 96 of the History of the Former Han dynasty, with an introduction by M.A.N. Loewe. Leiden 1979.
- Liu J., Guo D., Zhou Y., Wu Z.Y., Li W.Y., Zhao F., Zheng X.M., "Identification of ancient textiles from Yingpan, Xinjiang, by multiple analytical techniques". In Journal of Archaeological Science 2011, 38: 1763–1770.
- Schorta R., "A group of Central Asian woolen textiles in the Abegg-Stiftung collection". In: Keller D., Schorta R. (ed.), Fabulous creatures from the desert sands. Central Asian woolen textiles from the second century BC to the second century AD (Riggisberger Berichte 10). Riggisberg: Abegg-Stiftung 2001: 79–114.
- Wagner M., Wang B., Tarasov P., Westh-Hansen S.M., Völling E., Heller J., "The ornamental trousers from Sampula (Xinjiang, China): their origins and biography". Antiquity 2009, 83: 1065–1075.
- Wang B.H., The ancient corpses of Xinjiang. Ürümqi 1999.
- Wang B., Xiao X.Y., "A general introduction to the ancient tombs at Shanpula, Xinjiang, China". In: Keller D., Schorta R. (ed.), Fabulous creatures from the desert sands. Central Asian woolen textiles from the second century BC to the second century AD (Riggisberger Berichte 10). Riggisberg: Abegg-Stiftung 2001: 47–78.
