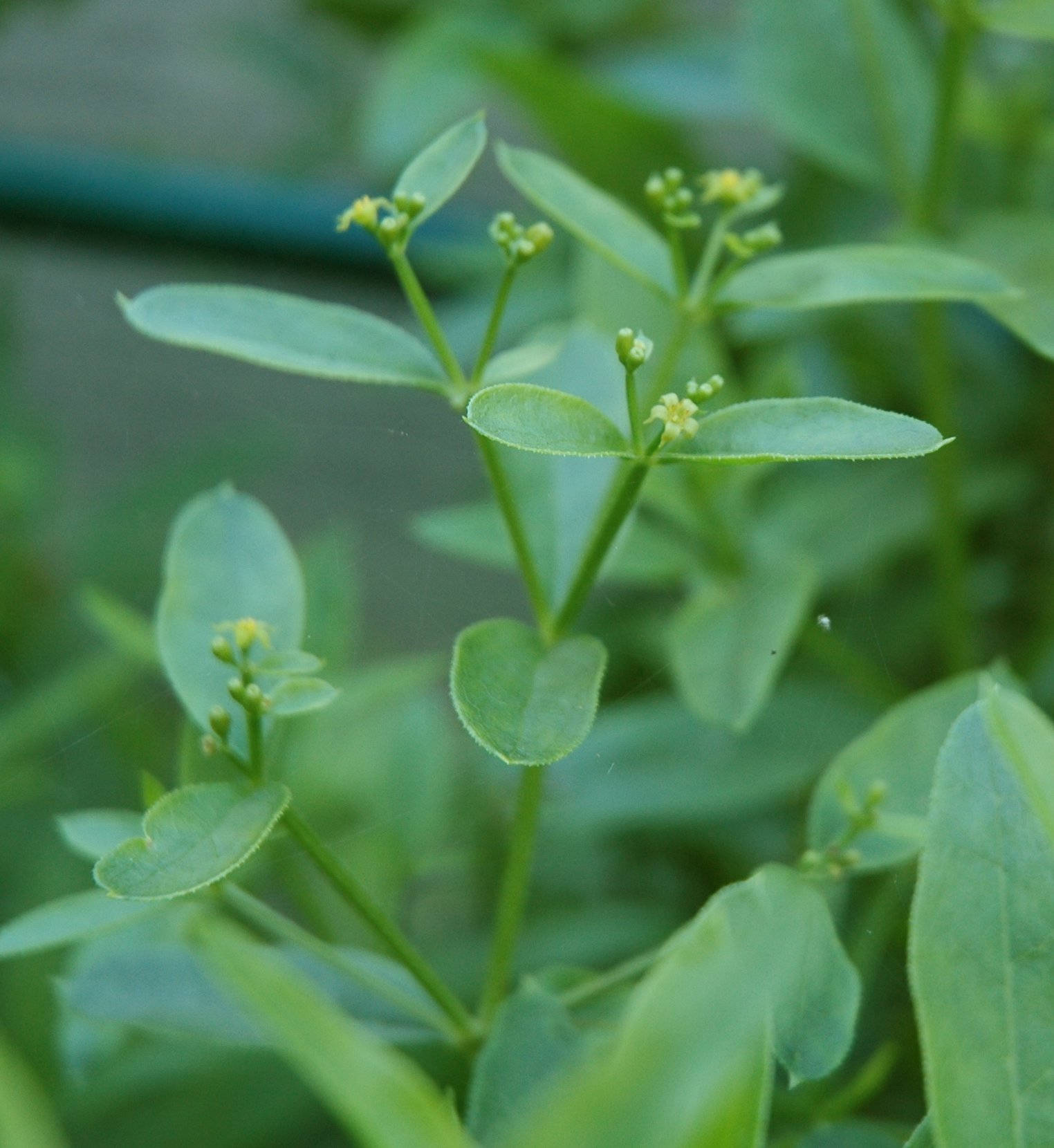

Scientific classification
- Kingdom: Plantae
- Clade: Tracheophytes
- Clade: Angiosperms
- Clade: Eudicots
- Clade: Asterids
- Order: Gentianales
- Family: Rubiaceae
- Genus: Rubia
- Species: R. tinctorum

Binomial name
- Rubia tinctorum L.

= Rubia tinctorum =

Species of flowering plant (rose madder)

Rubia tinctorum, the rose madder or common madder or dyer's madder, is a herbaceous perennial plant species belonging to the bedstraw and coffee family Rubiaceae. The type genus of the whole Rubiaceae family of around 80 flowering plants is called Rubia.

== Description ==
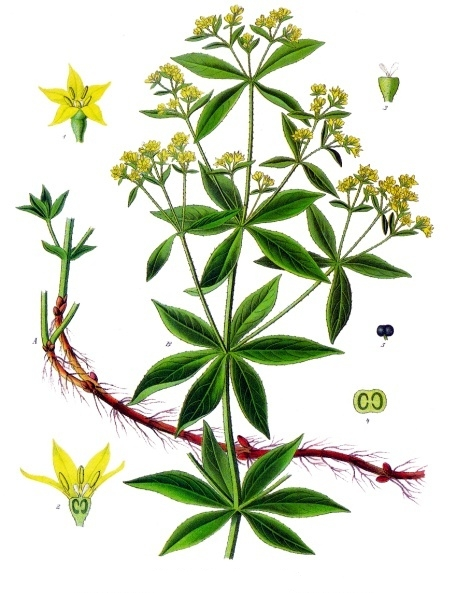

The common madder can grow up to 1.5 m in height. The evergreen leaves are approximately 5–10 cm long and 2–3 cm broad, produced in whorls of 4–7 starlike around the central stem. It climbs with tiny hooks at the leaves and stems. The flowers are small (3–5 mm across), with five pale yellow petals, in dense racemes, and appear from June to August, followed by small (4–6 mm diameter) red to black berries. The roots can be over a metre long, up to 12 mm thick and are the source of red dyes known as rose madder and Turkey red. It prefers loamy soils (sand and clay soil) with a constant level of moisture, as well as creek beds. Madder is used as a food plant by the larvae of some Lepidoptera species including the hummingbird hawk moth.

== Uses ==
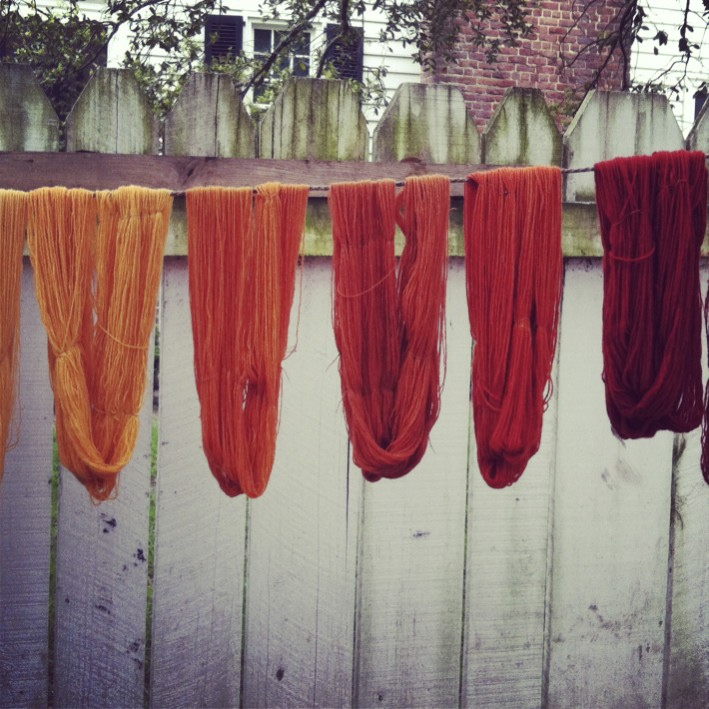
Naturally dyed skeins made with madder root, Colonial Williamsburg, Virginia, USA

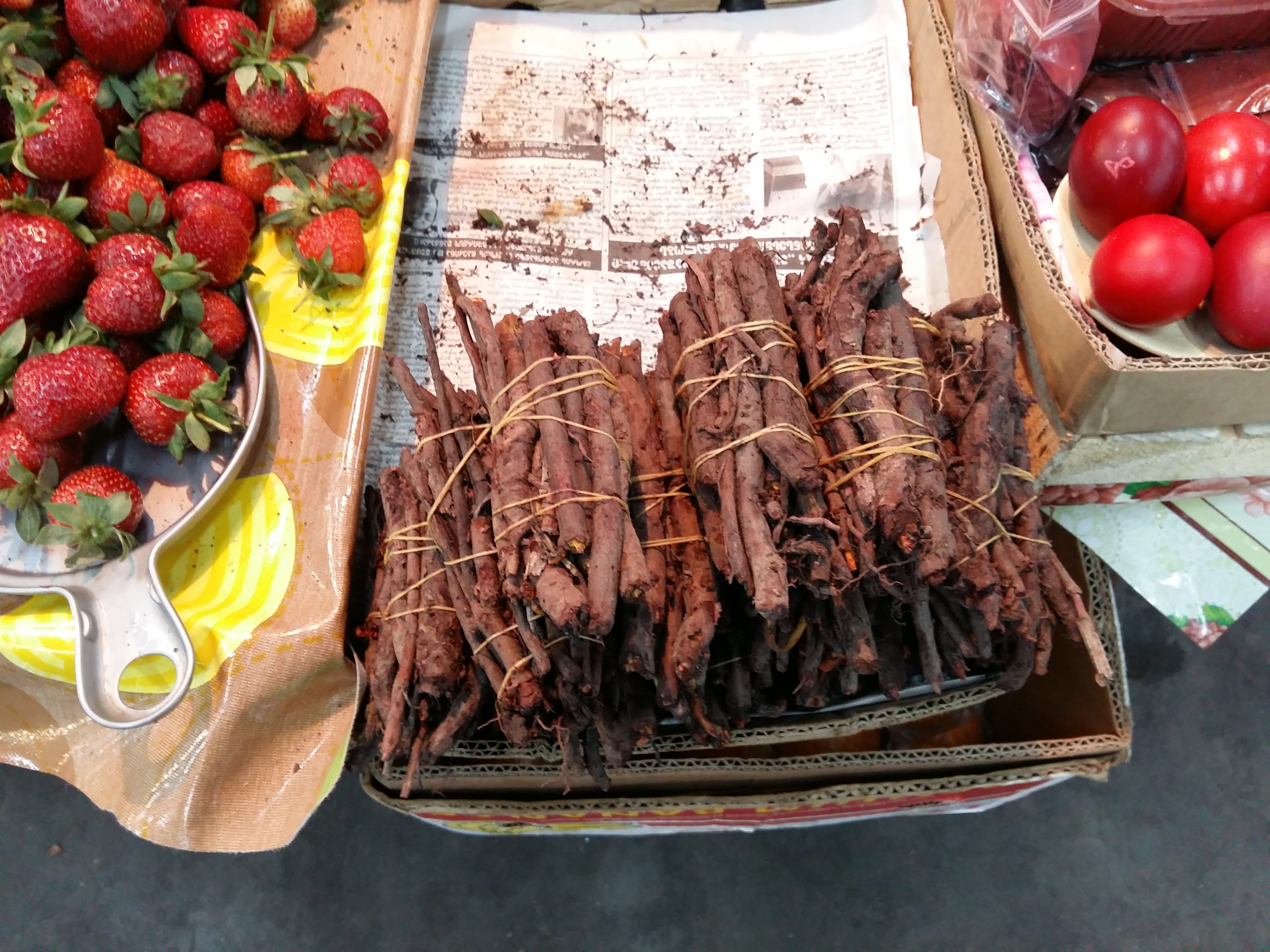
Madder roots, traditionally used to paint Easter eggs red by boiling them together, on sale in Kutaisi

It has been used since ancient times as a vegetable red dye for leather, wool, cotton and silk. For dye production, the roots are harvested after two years. The outer red layer gives the common variety of the dye, the inner yellow layer the refined variety. The dye is fixed to the cloth with help of a mordant, most commonly alum. Madder can be fermented for dyeing as well (Fleurs de garance). In France, the remains were used to produce a spirit.

The roots contain the glycoside ruberythric acid. By drying, fermenting, or treating with acids, this is hydrolyzed into free sugars, alizarin and purpurin, which were first isolated by the French chemist Pierre Jean Robiquet in 1826. Purpurin is normally not coloured, but is red when dissolved in alkaline solutions. Mixed with clay and treated with alum and ammonia, it gives a brilliant red colorant (madder lake).

The pulverised roots can be dissolved in sulfuric acid, which leaves a dye called garance (the French name for madder) after drying. Another method of increasing the yield consisted of dissolving the roots in sulfuric acid after they had been used for dyeing. This produces a dye called garanceux. By treating the pulverized roots with alcohol, colorine was produced. It contained 40–50 times the amount of alizarin of the roots.

The chemical name for the pigment is alizarin, of the anthraquinone-group, and was used to make the alizarine ink in 1855 by Professor Leonhardi of Dresden, Germany. In 1869, the German chemists Graebe and Liebermann synthesised artificial alizarin, which was produced industrially from 1871 onwards, effectively ending the cultivation of madder. In the 20th century, madder was only grown in some areas of France.

The plant's roots contain several polyphenolic compounds, such as 1,3-Dihydroxyanthraquinone (purpuroxanthin), 1,4-Dihydroxyanthraquinone (quinizarin), 1,2,4-Trihydroxyanthraquinone (purpurin) and 1,2-dihydroxyanthraquinone (alizarin). This last compound gives it its red colour to a textile dye known as rose madder. It was also used as a colourant, especially for paint, that is referred to as madder lake. The substance was also derived from another species, Rubia cordifolia.

Madder root-derived dyes have been used as textile dyes, lake pigments, food and cosmetic ingredients, and in medicine.

== History ==
Early evidence of dyeing comes from India where a piece of cotton dyed with madder has been recovered from the archaeological site at Mohenjo-daro (3rd millennium BCE). In Sanskrit, this plant is known by the name Manjishtha. It was used by hermits to dye their clothes saffron. Dioscorides and Pliny the Elder (De Re Natura) mention the plant (which the Romans called rubia passiva). In Viking Age levels of York, remains of both woad and madder have been excavated. The oldest European textiles dyed with madder come from the grave of the Merovingian queen Arnegundis in Saint-Denis near Paris (between 565 and 570 AD). In the "Capitulare de villis" of Charlemagne, madder is mentioned as "warentiam". The herbal of Hildegard of Bingen mentions the plant as well. The red coats of the British Redcoats were dyed with madder; earlier and perhaps officer's fabric being dyed with the better but more expensive cochineal. Madder is mentioned in the Talmud (e.g., tractate Sabbath 66b) where the madder plant is termed "puah" in Aramaic.

Turkey red was a strong, very fast red dye for cotton obtained from madder root via a complicated multistep process involving "sumac and oak galls, calf's blood, sheep's dung, oil, soda, alum, and a solution of tin." Turkey red was developed in India and spread to Turkey. Greek workers familiar with the methods of its production were brought to France in 1747, and Dutch and English spies soon discovered the secret. A sanitized version of Turkey red was being produced in Manchester by 1784, and roller-printed dress cottons with a Turkey red ground were fashionable in England by the 1820s.

Purple dyes were also produced with madder, by combining it with indigo, or using an iron mordant.
