= 1,2,4-Trihydroxyanthraquinone =

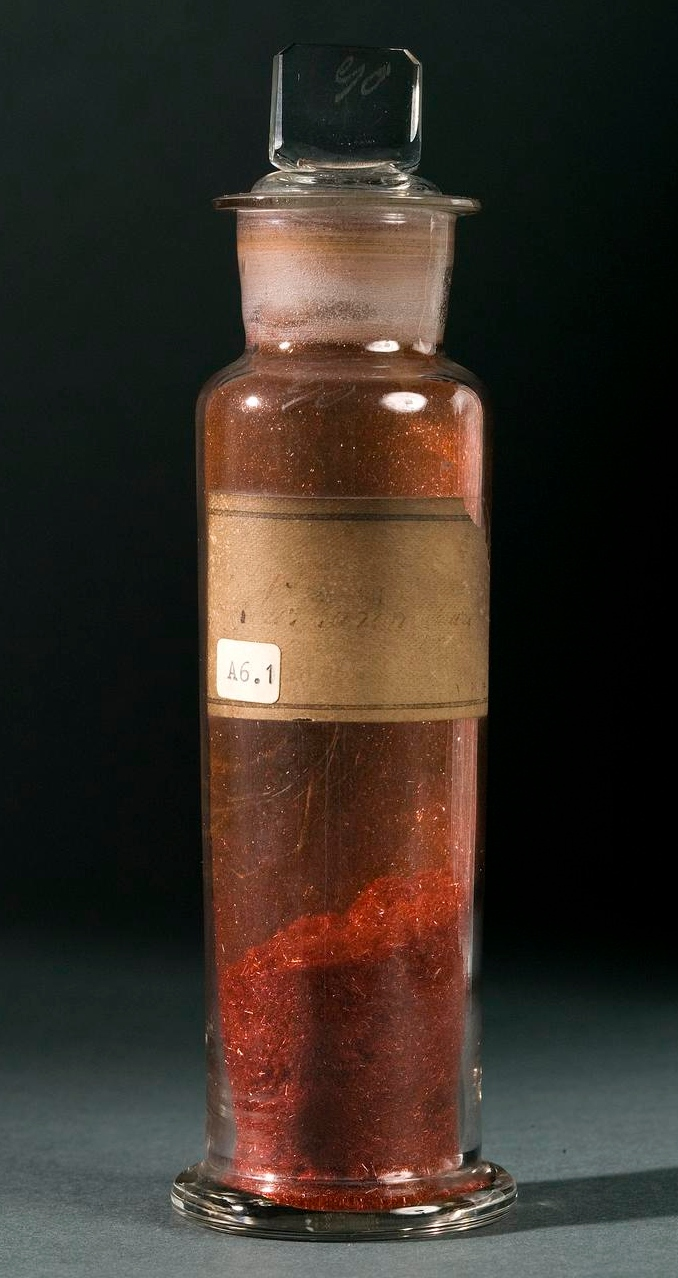

- Skeletal formula

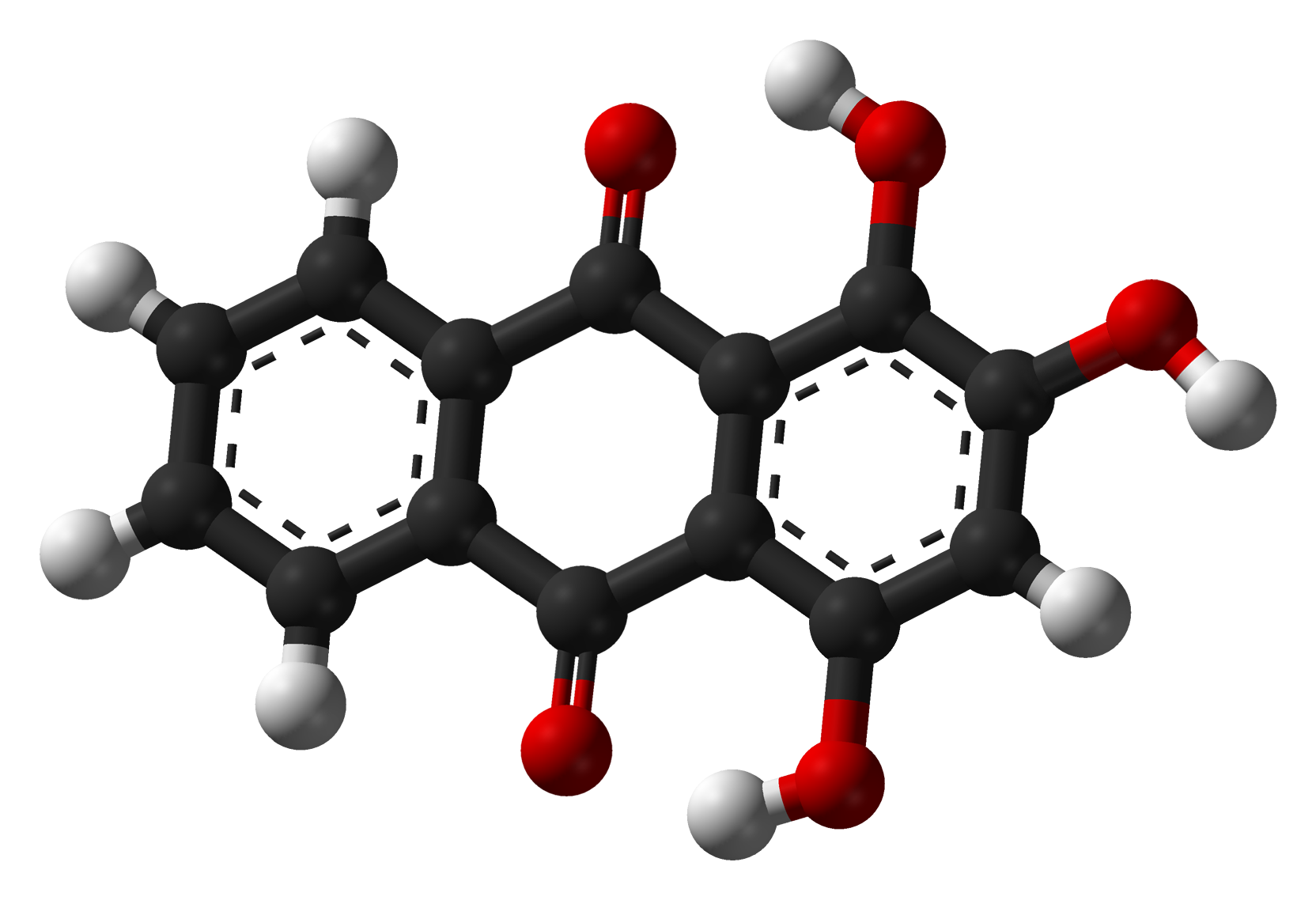
- Ball-and-stick model

Names
- Preferred IUPAC name 1,2,4-Trihydroxyanthracene-9,10-dione
- Other names Purpurin, Purpurine, Hydroxylizaric acid

Identifiers
CAS Number	81-54-9
3D model (JSmol)	Interactive image; Interactive image
ChEBI	CHEBI:8645
ChEMBL	ChEMBL294264
ChemSpider	6431
ECHA InfoCard	100.001.237
KEGG	C10395
PubChem CID	6683
UNII	L1GT81LS6N
CompTox Dashboard (EPA)	DTXSID4021214
- InChI: InChI=1S/C14H8O5/c15-8-5-9(16)14(19)11-10(8)12(17)6-3-1-2-4-7(6)13(11)18/h1-5,15-16,19H Key: BBNQQADTFFCFGB-UHFFFAOYSA-N; InChI=1/C14H8O5/c15-8-5-9(16)14(19)11-10(8)12(17)6-3-1-2-4-7(6)13(11)18/h1-5,15-16,19H Key: BBNQQADTFFCFGB-UHFFFAOYAW
- SMILES: C1=CC=C2C(=C1)C(=O)C3=C(C2=O)C(=C(C=C3O)O)O; O=C2c1ccccc1C(=O)c3c2c(O)cc(O)c3O

Properties
Chemical formula	C_{14}H_{8}O_{5}
Molar mass	256.21 g/mol
Melting point	259 °C (498 °F; 532 K)
- Except where otherwise noted, data are given for materials in their standard state (at 25 °C [77 °F], 100 kPa). verify (what is ?) Infobox references

1,2,4-Trihydroxyanthraquinone, commonly called purpurin, is an anthraquinone. It is a naturally occurring red/yellow dye. It is formally derived from 9,10-anthraquinone by replacement of three hydrogen atoms by hydroxyl (OH) groups.

Purpurin is also called verantin, smoke Brown G, hydroxylizaric acid, and C.I. 58205. It is a minor component of the classical lake pigment "madder lake" or Rose Madder.

Purpurin is a strong inhibitor of CYP1A1, CYP1A2 and CYP1B1, as well as a weak inhibitor of CYP2A6 and CYP2E1.

== History ==
Madder root has been used for dying cloth at least since 1500 BC. Purpurin and alizarin were isolated from the root by Pierre Robiquet and Colin, two French chemists, in 1826. They were identified as anthracene derivatives by Gräbe and Liebermann in 1868. They also synthesized alizarin from bromoanthraquinone, which, together with the conversion of alizarin into purpurin published previously by M. F. De Lalande, provided the first synthetic route to purpurin. The positions of the OH groups were determined by Bayer and Caro in 1874–1875.

== Natural occurrence ==
Purpurin occurs in the roots of the madder plant (Rubia tinctorum), together with alizarin (1,2-dihydroxyanthraquinone). The root actually contains colorless glycosides of the dyes.

== Properties ==
Purpurin is a crystalline solid, that forms orange-red needles melting at 259 °C (498 °F). It becomes red when dissolved in ethanol, and yellow when dissolved with alkalis in boiling water. It is insoluble in hexane but soluble in chloroform, and can be obtained from chloroform as reddish needles. Unlike alizarin, purpurin is dissolved by boiling in a solution of aluminium sulfate, from which it can be precipitated by acid. This procedure can be used to separate the two dyes.

Like many dihydroxy- and trihydroxyanthraquinones, pupurin has a purgative action, although only 1/20 as effective as 1,2,7-trihydroxyanthraquinone (anthrapurpurin).

== Uses ==
Purpurin is a fast dye for cotton printing and forms complexes with various metal ions. It fades faster than alizarin on exposure to sunlight.

A study published in Nature journal Scientific Reports suggests that the purpurin could replace cobalt in lithium-ion batteries. Eliminating cobalt would mean eliminating a hazardous material, allow batteries to be produced at room temperature, and lower the cost of recycling batteries. Extracting purpurin from farmed madder is a simple task; alternately, the chemical could be synthesized in a lab.

== See also ==
- Trihydroxyanthraquinone
- Pierre Robiquet, discoverer of purpurin in 1826
