= Garance =

Origin
- Word/name: French
- Meaning: Rubia tinctorum.

Garance is a given name that is derived from Garance des teinturiers, which is the French name of the plant Rubia tinctorum. It also refers to the deep red color, also known as rose madder, from the dye derived from the plant.

Notable people with the name include:

- Garance Doré (born 1975), French photographer
- Garance Genicot (born 1974), Belgian-American economist
- Garance Le Guillermic (born 1997), French actress
- Garance Marillier (born 1998), French actress

The fictional character of the courtesan in the film Children of Paradise was Claire "Garance" Reine played by Arletty.
