= Pierre Jean Robiquet =

French chemist

Pierre Robiquet
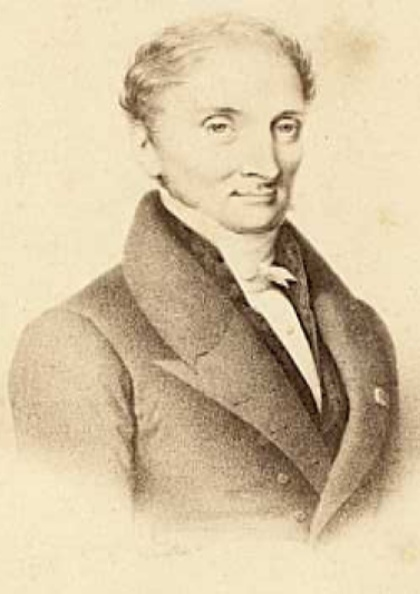
- Portrait c. 1825–1830
- Born: 14 January 1780; Rennes, Brittany, Kingdom of France
- Died: 29 April 1840 (aged 60); Paris, Kingdom of the French
- Occupation: Chemist

Pierre Jean Robiquet (French pronunciation: [pjɛʁ ʒɑ̃ ʁɔbikɛ]; 13 January 1780 – 29 April 1840) was a French chemist. He laid founding work in identifying amino acids, the fundamental building blocks of proteins. He did this through recognizing the first of them, asparagine, in 1806, while working as an assistant for Louis Nicolas Vauquelin. He likewise laid founding work in the industry's adoption of industrial dyes, with the identification of alizarin in 1826, and in the emergence of modern medications, through the identification of codeine in 1832, an opiate alkaloid substance of widespread use with analgesic and antidiarrheal properties.

Robiquet was born in Rennes. He was at first a pharmacist in the French armies during the French Revolution years, and became a professor at the École de pharmacie in Paris, where he died.

Notable scientific achievements were among other things his isolation and characterization of properties of asparagine (the first amino acid to be identified, from asparagus, achieved. In 1806, with Louis Nicolas Vauquelin), cantharidin (1810), the sigma-1 receptor agonist noscapine (1817), caffeine (1821), alizarin (later on moved to mass industrial production by Carl Gräbe and Carl Theodore Liebermann in Germany, and by William Henry Perkin in Great Britain) and purpurin (1826), Orcin (1829), amygdalin (1830), as well as codeine (1832). Some of these discoveries were made in collaboration with other scientists.

== Academic titles and distinctions ==
Registered Pharmacist (1808), lecturer in chemistry at the École Polytechnique (1811), Deputy Professor in History of pharmaceutical matters (1811) then Professor (1814) then Administrator-Treasurer (1824) at the Ecole de Pharmacie now the Faculté de Pharmacie see [3], member then Secretary General (1817) and President (1826) of the Société de Pharmacie later on known as Académie Nationale de Pharmacie see [8], member of the Académie de Médecine (1820), member of the Académie des Sciences (1833), one of the founders and first President of the Société de Prévoyance des Pharmaciens see [6](1820).

Distinguished with the order of the Légion d'Honneur (1830).

== Discovery of asparagine, the first amino acid ever identified ==
In the fall of 1805, Robiquet, then a young help working in the laboratory of Louis Nicolas Vauquelin, started analyses, with what rudimentary methods were then available, with asparagus juice. After a number of operations he obtained a crystallized white matter, which he and Vauquelin tried to characterize in 1806 as day by day their attempts found it to be some kind of new "chemical principle" with hitherto unknown properties, nothing like well known mineral salts classically obtained in the 18th century. Duly convinced this is something completely new, they call this matter "asparagin", after the asparagus plant they extracted it from. Asparagine will turn out to be one of the 22 amino acids that build-up all living matter on earth, the first ever identified and understood as belonging to a new class of molecules. Progress in isolating the other amino acids was very slow, with less than a handful in total during the whole 19th century.

== Discovery of various dyes ==
Even until the middle of 19th century, all dyes used for colouring cloth were natural substances, many of which were expensive and labour-intensive to extract. Furthermore, many lacked stability through washing or exposure to sunlight, or fastness.

For instance, the colour purple, which had been a mark of aristocracy and prestige since ancient times in Rome, the Middle East and Egypt, was especially expensive and difficult to produce—the dye used, known as Tyrian purple, was made from the glandular mucus of certain molluscs. Its extraction was variable and complicated, and dependent on the availability of the very specific type of shell (actually two types, now known the one as Bolinus brandaris, and the other as Hexaplex trunculus, nowadays classified within two different genera) from which it was extracted.

Another type of natural red dye used from times immemorial was obtained from madder root in Central Asia and Egypt, where it was grown as early as 1500 BC. Cloth dyed with madder root pigment was found in the tomb of the Pharaoh Tutankhamun and in the ruins of Pompeii and ancient Corinth. In the Middle Ages, Charlemagne encouraged madder cultivation. It grew well in the sandy soils of the Netherlands and became an important part of the local economy. By 1804, the English dye maker George Field had introduced new techniques known as lake madder, that extended the use of the tincture to paints.

Robiquet obtained from madder root two distinct molecules with dye properties, the one producing a magnificent red, that he called alizarin, which proved as well extremely stable, and another, of less stable properties, that he called purpurin.

Some 30 years later in April 1856, William Henry Perkin, then a mere youngster working as assistant at the Royal College of Chemistry in London within a team intent on research over the synthesis of quinine, a potent drug, discovered a process that obtained a purple dye (which he called mauveine) from aniline, which in turn could be easily obtained from coal tar; over the next ten years Perkin set up the first industrial model of molecules obtained through synthesis from coal tar and his success had prompted intense research from numerous teams all over Europe on coal tar by-products, while he himself pursued such a work on top of his industrial activity.

Thus it came that in 1868, in turn alizarin was proved to be obtainable from anthracene, in parallel by Perkin and by Carl Gräbe and Carl Theodore Liebermann, both working in Germany for the BASF company; unfortunately Perkin missed the patent priority by one single day, alizarin's extraordinary properties made it become the first really mass industry-produced dye and enabled the rise of BASF to first rank in the chemistry industry world.

== Discovery and industrialization of codeine ==
Codeine is probably Robiquet's most important contribution, that prevails still today with a very strong presence and impact on daily life; in effect, until the beginning of the 19th century, raw opium was used in diverse preparations known as laudanum (see Thomas de Quincey's "Confessions of an English Opium-Eater"), paregoric elixirs (a number of them, very popular in England since the beginning of the 18th century), and health or even death hazards to users from improper preparation or improper use were frequent.

The isolation of codeine by Robiquet from opium's several active components while working on refined morphine extraction processes, opened the path to the elaboration of a new generation of specific antitussive and antidiarrheal potions of much safer use, based on codeine only, which became immediately extremely popular.

Codeine is nowadays by far the most widely used opiate in the world and very likely even the most commonly used drug overall according to numerous reports over the years by organizations such as the World Health Organization and its League of Nations predecessor agency and others. It is one of the most effective orally-administered opioid analgesics and has a wide safety margin. It is from 8 to 12 percent of the strength of morphine in most people; differences in metabolism can change this figure as can other medications, depending on its route of administration.

While codeine can still be directly extracted from opium, its original source, most codeine is nowadays synthesized from morphine through the process of O-methylation.

== Sundry researches in pharmacology; missing by a hair's breadth the identification of the benzoyl radical in 1830 ==
Robiquet has analysed the chemical byproducts that could be obtained from a variety of plants: asparagus, madder root, as already mentioned, with the important associated discoveries, and also others, which mostly helped in consolidating the existence of some molecules in a wide range of plants. Thus, in 1809, Robiquet extracts from liquorice root a sweetish matter which he dubs glycyrrhizin, from Glycirrhiza, the denomination of the genus to which belongs liquorice. He also obtained an oily fraction (0.8%), small quantities of a matter with properties of a gum, albuminic substances, tannins, starch, a yellowish dye, a fraction with bitter taste, and, as from asparagi, a fraction that can be crystallized and seemingly close to asparagin, which it will be indeed proven to be in 1828 by Plisson.

Robiquet likewise analysed a variety of animal tissues. Thus in 1810, he isolated from Lytta vesicatoria, an insect, a molecule that he calls cantharidin, which he proves is the cause of the severe irritations and blisters provoked by that insect, and is present in a variety of unrelated species that use the molecule as a protection of their eggs from predation [1] (Two families of insects belonging to the order of Coleoptera synthetase that molecule : Meloidae and Oedemeridae. The first family, to the which Lytta vesicatoria belongs in the Lytta genus, is rich of several thousands of species)

In fact, even back into the days of the early classical period civilizations of the western Mediterranean, some types of flies from Spain had a reputation for inducing aphrodisiac effects when used in preparations after having been desiccated. Cantharidin has never been proven to provide such collateral benefits, whereas Robiquet demonstrated it had very definite toxic and poisonous properties comparable in degree to that of the most violent poisons known in the 19th century, such as strychnine.

This particular study, that demonstrated, as early as in 1810, the possibility to separate, using "energetic" methods, a simple "principle" that was the actual effective fraction of a traditional natural compound obtained by "soft" methods has been exemplary for the burgeoning community of chemists in the early 19th century, and will prompt very rapidly a flurry of similar attempts that will yield within a few decades an incredible number of molecules from an ever growing number of research groups throughout Europe, and soon in the trail, in the US. In the frame of that same investigation, Robiquet in addition evidences the presence of uric acid within insects feeding on plant tissues.

Over a period of some fifteen years, Pierre Robiquet will also conduct a series of investigations on bitter almonds oil, a complex substance obtained from Prunus dulcis. In 1816, together with Jean-Jacques Colin, they obtain a new component which they call "éther hydrochlorique", (1,2-dichloroethane), which they will try to promote as a reinvigorating medicine.

In 1830, together with Antoine Boutron-Charlard, Robiquet obtains a new molecule which he calls amygdalin; this component presented strange properties and was the first glycoside to be evidenced. This discovery was opening the door to the huge family of aromatic molecules, that are based on the cyclic 6 carbon benzenoic structure. In their various attempts at breaking down amygdalin in by-products, Robiquet and Boutron-Charlard obtained benzaldehyde but they failed in working out a proper interpretation of the structure of amygdalin that would account for it, and thus missed the identification of the benzoyl radical C_{7}H_{5}O. This last step was achieved some few months later (1832) by Friedrich Wöhler and Justus Liebig, these two got all the credit for this breakthrough result that was opening an entirely new branch for the industry of chemicals with wide-ranging applications.

Amygdalin and related molecules have been used throughout the 19th (promoted by Ernst T. Krebs) and 20th centuries as anti-cancer drugs, however with inconclusive results as to actual benefits, while it was demonstrated in 1972 in a study at the Sloan-Kettering Cancer Institute that amygdalin (often sold under the brand name of "Laetrile") could be toxic as it breaks down in the body to form cyanide.

== Main published works ==
- 1805 : Essai analytique des asperges Annales de chimie, 55 (1805), 152–171
- 1806 : La découverte d'un nouveau principe végétal dans le suc des asperges L.N.Vauquelin et P.J.Robiquet, Annales de Chimie, 57, p88–93.
- 1810 : Expériences sur les cantharides, Robiquet, Annales de Chimie, 1810, vol. 76, pp. 302–322.
- 1812 : Observations sur la nature du kermès, Robiquet, Annales de Chimie, 81 (1812), 317–331.
- 1816 : Recherches sur la nature de la matière huileuse des chimistes hollandais, Robiquet, Colin, Annales de Chimie et de Physique, 1816, vol. 1, pp. 337–45.
- 1817 : Observations sur le memoire de M. Sertuerner relatif à l’analyse de l’opium, Robiquet, Annales de Chimie et de Physique,5 (1817), 275–278;
- 1822 : Nouvelles experiences sur l’huile volatile d’amandes ameres, Robiquet, Annales de Chimie et de Physique, 21 (1822), 250–255.
- 1826 : De l'emploi du bicarbonate de soude dans le traitement médical des calculs urinaires
- 1826 : Sur un nouveau principe immédiat des végétaux (l’alizarine) obtenu de la garance Robiquet, Colin, Journal de pharmacie et des sciences accessories, 12 (1826), 407–412
- 1827 : Nouvelles recherches sur la matière colorante de la garance, Robiquet, Colin, Annales de chimie et de physique, 34 (1827), 225–253
- 1829 : Essai analytique des lichens de l’orseille, Robiquet, Annales de chimie et de physique, 42 (1829), 236–257
- 1830 : Nouvelles expériences sur les amandes amères et sur l'huile volatile qu'elles fournissent Robiquet, Boutron-Charlard, Annales de chimie et de physique, 44 (1830), 352–382
- 1831 : Nouvelles expériences sur la semence de moutarde
- 1832 : Nouvelles observations sur les principaux produits de l’opium, P.J.Robiquet, Annales de chimie et de physique, 51 (1832), 225–267
- 1832 : Notice historique sur André Laugier (suivie d'une autre notice sur Auguste-Arthur Plisson)

== See also ==
- Joseph Bienaimé Caventou
- Theodore Nicolas Gobley
- Carl Gräbe
- Carl Theodore Liebermann
- William Henry Perkin
- Pierre Joseph Pelletier
- Louis-Nicolas Vauquelin

== Sources ==
- "Pierre Jean Robiquet", in Louis-Gabriel Michaud, old and modern universal Biography: history alphabetically of the public and private life of all the men with the collaboration of exactly 367 scientists and literary men French or foreign, 2e edition, 1843–1865
- Warolin, C (1999). "[Pierre-Jean Robiquet]". Rev Hist Pharm (Paris). 47 (321): 97–110. doi:10.3406/pharm.1999.4935. PMID 11625518. comprehensive document using the obituary by Antoine Bussy for life details, and with modern insights into the researches of Robiquet, in French
- Pierre Jean Robiquet (1780–1840), dans "Figures pharmaceutiques françaises", 3 p, de Pierre Crété.
- Antoine Bussy Eloge de Pierre Robiquet. J. pharm., avril 1841 (Obituary)
