= George Field (chemist) =

Chemist

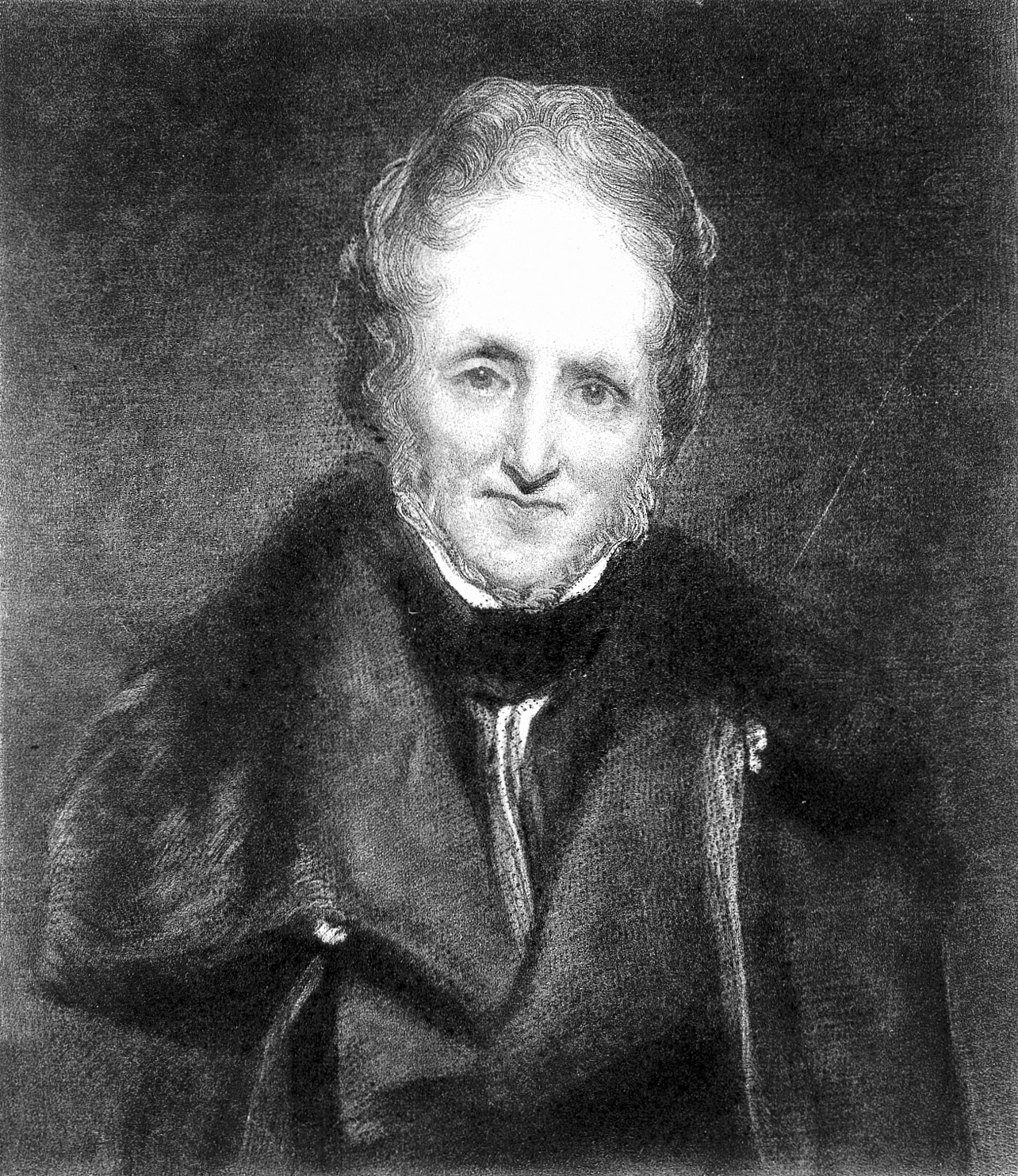
George Field. Credit: Wellcome Library

George Field (1777?–1854), was an English chemist. He was born in or about 1777 at Berkhamsted, Hertfordshire, of a family long settled in that town, and was educated at St. Peter's school there. When about eighteen years of age he came to London to seek a profession. He thought he saw an opening in the careful application of chemistry to pigments and dyes. War on the continent, by stopping the supply of madder from Holland, threatened to impede his progress. This obstacle, however, led him to consider the nature of its cultivation, and with a well-devised project he waited on Sir Joseph Banks for his advice, and, as he hoped, his co-operation. Sir Joseph, after unsuccessfully attempting to cultivate madder in Essex, had made up his mind that it could not be done in England.

== Horticulture and inventions ==
Field then commenced the cultivation in his own garden, and from roots of his own growth produced beautiful specimens of colouring matter. A contrivance, both mechanical and chemical, was still wanted to reduce the liquor to its finest consistence. His invention of the ‘physeter’ or percolator by atmospheric pressure admirably accomplished this purpose. He exhibited his percolator, together with an improved drying stove and press, before the Society of Arts, and was awarded their gold Isis medal in 1816 ‘for his apparatus for preparing coloured lakes.’ Both apparatus are figured and described by him in the Society's ‘Transactions,’ xxxiv. 87–94. Oddly enough the percolator was patented by others several years after, and applied to the clearing of sugar. Field continued his application of science to the purposes of the artist with good effect; his dexterity and care in the preparation of delicate colours set all competition at defiance. Among his other inventions may be mentioned his metrochrome and his conical lenses, which produced a continuous rainbow with varied effects of refractions.

== Death and bequests ==
Field died at Syon Hill Park Cottage, Isleworth, Middlesex, on 28 September 1854, aged 77. He bequeathed to the Royal Institute of British Architects six architectural drawings by J. L. Bond; to the Hanwell Lunatic Asylum ‘The Maniac,’ by R. Dawes, R.A.; while to the library of London University he gave a portrait of Dr. William Harvey, by Mirevelt.

== Writings ==
Field's reputation as an author rests on his Chromatography; or, a Treatise on Colours and Pigments, and of their Powers in Painting, London, 1835. A revised edition by T. W. Salter, appeared in 1869, and a third by J. S. Taylor, on the basis of Salter's, in 1885. Another professional treatise, his Rudiments of the Painter's Art; or, a Grammar of Colouring (London, 1850), was revised and in part rewritten by R. Mallet in 1870, and again in 1875 by E. A. Davidson, who added sections on painting in sepia, water-colours, and oils. Field's other writings were:

- Tritogenea; or, A brief Outline of the Universal System, in vol. ix. of The Pamphleteer (1813–26); 3rd edit., London, 1846.
- Dianoia. The third Organon attempted; or, Elements of Logic and Subjective Philosophy, in vol. xii. of the same publication.
- The Analogy of the Physical Sciences indicated, in vol. xv. of the same.
- Æsthetics; or, the Analogy of the Sensible Sciences indicated, with an appendix on light and colours, in vol. xvii. of the same.
- Ethics; or, the Analogy of the Moral Sciences indicated, in vol. xxiii. of the same.
- Outlines of Analogical Philosophy, being a primary view of the principles, relations, and purposes of Nature, Science, and Art, 2 vols., London, 1839.
