= Arthur von Hübl =

Austrian military officer, chemist and cartographer (1853–1922)

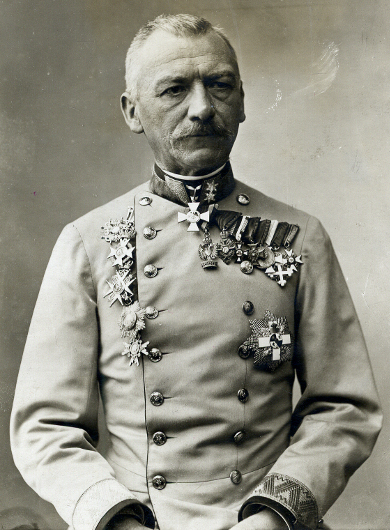
- Born: 20 March 1853; Grosswardein, Austrian Empire
- Died: 7 April 1932 (aged 79); Vienna, Austria
- Education: TU Wien
- Known for: Hübl method
- Scientific career
- Fields: Chemistry, photography, cartography

Baron Arthur von Hübl (20 March 1853 – 7 April 1932) was an Austrian military officer, chemist and cartographer. He developed the Hübl method for determining the iodine value and modernized cartography in Austria.

He was born to the Austrian army officer Franz Freiherr von Hübl and Emilie Jilg in Grosswardein, which was then part of Austro-Hungarian empire, and now belongs to Romania. After graduating from the Technical Military Academy in Vienna, he joined the Austrian army as an artillery lieutenant. In 1879–1881 he studied at the chemistry department of TU Wien, where he developed his method of iodine value determination, and mostly worked in the fields of oleochemistry and photochemistry.

Later he also made several achievements in photogrammetry, a 3D mapping technique that uses two or more photographic images taken from different positions, and in photography. Together with a fellow Austrian officer Giuseppe Pizzighelli he modified the platinum print photographic process invented by William Willis in England. For this 1882 work, Hübl and Pizzighelli received the Golden Voigtländer Medal of the Vienna Photographic Society in 1883.

In 1885, Hübl moved to the Institute for Military Geography in Vienna, where he was responsible for reproduction and printing of Austrian maps. There he optimized several techniques in the fields of lithography, color photography and photogrammetry, and in 1910 established a department of photogrammetry at the institute. In 1909 he introduced offset printing to Austria. He retired from military service in 1913, and in 1916–1918 headed the Institute for Military Geography. In 1918 he received an honorary doctorate from the TU Wien. Later, from 1920 to 1924, he worked in Brazil, popularizing photogrammetry there and helping establish the Brazilian Cartographic Institute.

Baron von Hübl died in 1932 in Vienna. The Hübl Peak in Antarctica is named after him.
