= Alizarine ink =

Type of ink

Alizarine ink was created in 1855 by Professor Christian August Leonhardi of Dresden, Germany, by adding alizarin dye (derived from the root of the madder plant) to conventional iron gall ink. This added an attractive coloration to the ink, which was quite popular until it was replaced by more modern chemical inks.

An 1881 recipe for Alizarine ink may be found in the Household Cyclopedia of General Information.

== See also ==
- Alizarin
