= Rose madder =

Red paint made from the madder plant

Rose Madder
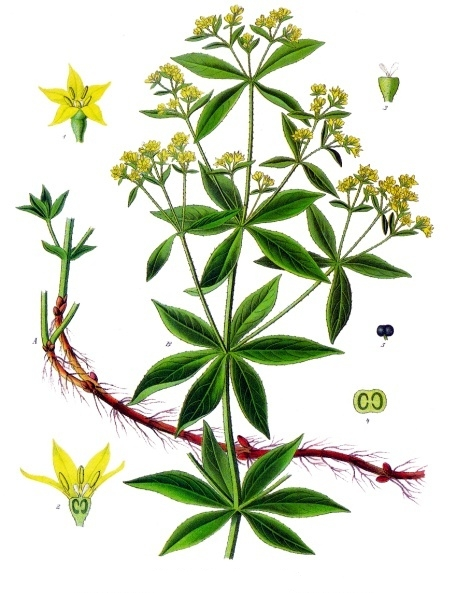
- Rubia tinctorum, from whose root the colour is extracted

Color coordinates
- Hex triplet: #E32636
- sRGB^{B} (r, g, b): (227, 38, 54)
- HSV (h, s, v): (355°, 83%, 89%)
- CIELCh_{uv} (L, C, h): (49, 142, 10°)
- B: Normalized to [0–255] (byte)

Rose madder (also known as madder) is a red paint made from the pigment madder lake, a traditional lake pigment extracted from the common madder plant Rubia tinctorum.

Madder lake contains two organic red dyes: alizarin and purpurin. As a paint, it has been described as a fugitive, transparent, nonstaining, mid valued, moderately dull violet red pigment in tints and medium solutions, darkening to an impermanent, dull magenta red in masstone.

== History ==
Madder has been cultivated as a dyestuff since antiquity in Central Asia, South Asia, and Egypt, where it was grown as early as 1500 BC. Cloth dyed with madder root dye was found in the tomb of the Pharaoh Tutankhamun and on an Egyptian tomb painting from the Graeco-Roman period, diluted with gypsum to produce a pink color. It was also found in ancient Greece (in Corinth), and in Italy in the Baths of Titus and the ruins of Pompeii. It is referred to in the Talmud as well as mentioned in writings by Dioscorides (who referred to it as ἐρυθρόδανον, "erythródanon"), Hippocrates, and other literary figures, and in artwork where it is referred to as rubio and used in paintings by J. M. W. Turner and as a color for ceramics. In Spain, madder was introduced and then cultivated by the Moors.

The production of a lake pigment from madder seems to have been first invented by the ancient Egyptians. Several techniques and recipes developed. Ideal color was said to come from plants 18 to 28 months old that had been grown in calcareous soil, which is full of lime and typically chalky. Most were considered relatively weak and extremely fugitive until 1804, when the English dye maker George Field refined the technique of making a lake from madder by treating it with alum and an alkali. The resulting madder lake had a less fugitive color and could be used more efficaciously, for example by blending it into a paint. Over the following years, other metal salts, including those containing chromium, iron, and tin, were found to be usable in place of alum to give madder-based pigments of various other colors.

In 1827, the French chemists Pierre-Jean Robiquet and Colin began producing garancine, the concentrated version of natural madder. They then found that madder lake contained two colorants, the red alizarin and the more rapidly fading purpurin. Purpurin is only present in the natural form of madder and gives a distinctive orange/red generally warmer tone that pure synthetic alizarin does not. Purpurin fluoresces yellow to red under ultraviolet light, while synthetic alizarin slightly shows violet. Alizarin was discovered before purpurin, by heating the ground madder with acid and potash. A yellow vapor crystallized into bright red needles: alizarin. This alizarin concentrate comprises only 1% of the madder root.

Natural rose madder supplied half the world with red, until 1868, when its alizarin component became the first natural dye to be synthetically duplicated by Carl Gräbe and Carl Liebermann. Advances in the understanding of chemistry, such as chemical structures, chemical formulas, and elemental formulas, aided these Berlin-based scientists in discovering that alizarin had an anthracene base. However, their recipe was not feasible for large-scale production; it required expensive and volatile substances, specifically bromine.

William Perkin, the inventor of mauveine, filed a patent in June 1869 for a new way to produce alizarin without bromine. Gräbe, Liebermann, and Heinrich Caro filed a patent for a similar process just one day before Perkin did – yet both patents were granted, as Perkin's had been sealed first. They divided the market in half: Perkin sold to the English market, and the scientists from Berlin to the United States and mainland Europe.

Because this synthetic alizarin dye could be produced for a fraction of the cost of the natural madder dye, it quickly replaced all madder-based colorants then in use (in, for instance, British army red coats that had been a shade of madder from the late 17th century to 1870, and French military cloth, often called "Turkey Red"). In turn, alizarin itself has now been largely replaced by the more light-resistant quinacridone pigments originally developed at DuPont in 1958.

It is still manufactured in traditional ways to meet the demands of the fine art market.

== Other names ==
- Alizarin's chemical composition: 1,2 dihydroxyanthraquinone (C_{14}H_{8}O_{4})
- Alizarin crimson, a paint very similar in color to Rose Madder Genuine but derived from synthetic Alizarin
- Lacca di robbia, Italian name
- Laque de garance, French name
- Natural Red 9 abbreviated NR9, Color Index name
- Purpurin's chemical composition: 1,2,4 trihydroxyanthraquinone (C_{14}H_{8}O_{5})
- Rose madder genuine, sometimes used to specify a paint derived from the root of the madder plant in the traditional manner It is still manufactured and used by some, but is too fugitive for professional artistic use.
- Rose madder hue, sometimes used to specify a paint made from other pigments but meant to approximate the color of rose madder
- Rubia tinctorum, the herbaceous perennial from which the rose madder pigment is derived
- Turkey red

== Substitutes ==
As all madder-based pigments are fugitive, artists have long sought a more permanent and lightfast replacement for rose madder and alizarin. Alternative pigments include:

- Anthraquinone red (PR177), a chemical cousin of Alizarin
- Benzamida carmine (PR176)
- Perylene maroon (PR179), for mixing dull violets
- Pyrrole rubine (PR264)
- Quinacridone magenta (PR122), for a brighter violet
- Quinacridone pyrrolodone
- Quinacridone rose (PV19), for a brighter violet
- Quinacridone violet (PV19), particularly dark and reddish varieties

== In art, entertainment, and media ==
- Rose Madder is the title of a 1995 novel by Stephen King, in which a woman named Rose Daniels escapes her abusive husband and travels through time by entering a painting of a woman in a gown dyed with rose madder.
- "Madder Red" is the title of a 2009 song by Yeasayer on the album Odd Blood.
- Jonathon Keats uses the gradual fading of rose madder oil paint to record a single image over the course of 1000 years in his "millennium camera".
- Blue Madder is the third album released by Savoy Brown in May 1969 on Decca Records.
- The Maddermarket Theatre in Norwich has connections with the use of madder as a dye in the city.
- Madder Lake is an enduring Australian progressive rock band.
