= Alizarin =

Chemical compound and histologic stain

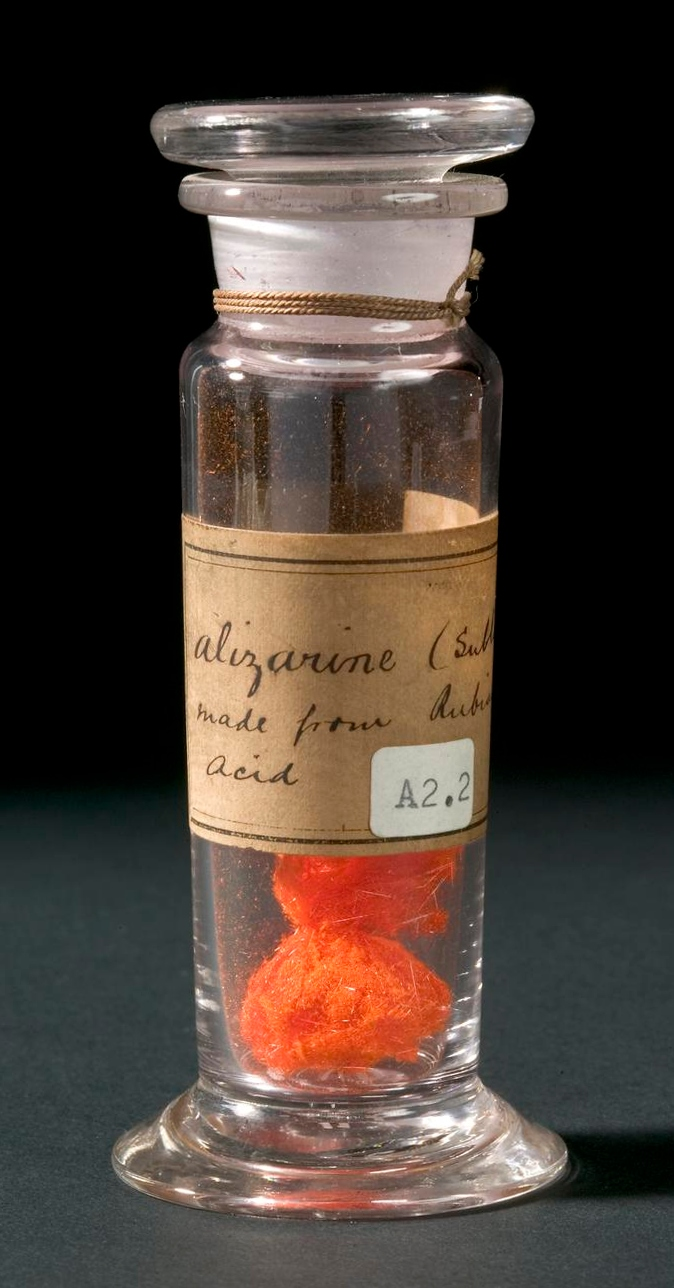

- Ball-and-stick model of alizarin

Names
- Preferred IUPAC name 1,2-Dihydroxyanthracene-9,10-dione
- Other names 1,2-Dihydroxy-9,10-anthracenedione; 1,2-Dihydroxyanthraquinone; Turkey red Mordant red 11; Alizarin B Alizarin red

Identifiers
CAS Number	72-48-0
3D model (JSmol)	Interactive image
Beilstein Reference	1914037
ChEBI	CHEBI:16866
ChEMBL	ChEMBL55814
ChemSpider	6056
ECHA InfoCard	100.000.711
Gmelin Reference	34541
KEGG	C01474
PubChem CID	6293
UNII	60MEW57T9G
CompTox Dashboard (EPA)	DTXSID5045960
- InChI: InChI=1S/C14H8O4/c15-10-6-5-9-11(14(10)18)13(17)8-4-2-1-3-7(8)12(9)16/h1-6,15,18H Key: RGCKGOZRHPZPFP-UHFFFAOYSA-N; InChI=1/C14H8O4/c15-10-6-5-9-11(14(10)18)13(17)8-4-2-1-3-7(8)12(9)16/h1-6,15,18H Key: RGCKGOZRHPZPFP-UHFFFAOYAG
- SMILES: O=C2c1ccccc1C(=O)c3c2ccc(O)c3O

Properties
Chemical formula	C_{14}H_{8}O_{4}
Appearance	orange-red crystals or powder
Density	1.540 g/cm^{3}
Melting point	289.5 °C (553.1 °F; 562.6 K)
Boiling point	430 °C (806 °F; 703 K)
Solubility in water	slightly to sparingly soluble
Acidity (pK_{a})	6.94

Hazards
- GHS labelling
Pictograms	(GHS07: Exclamation mark)
Signal word	Warning
Hazard statements	H302, H315, H319
Precautionary statements	P264, P264+P265, P270, P280, P301+P317, P302+P352, P305+P351+P338, P321, P330, P332+P317, P337+P317, P362+P364, P501
NFPA 704 (fire diamond)	2 1 0
Safety data sheet (SDS)	External MSDS

Related compounds
Related compounds	anthraquinone, anthracene
- Except where otherwise noted, data are given for materials in their standard state (at 25 °C [77 °F], 100 kPa). verify (what is ?) Infobox references

Alizarin (also known as 1,2-dihydroxyanthraquinone, Mordant Red 11, C.I. 58000, and Turkey Red) is an organic compound with formula C_{14}H_{8}O_{4} that has been used throughout history as a red dye, principally for dyeing textile fabrics. Historically it was derived from the roots of plants of the madder genus. In 1869, it became the first natural dye to be produced synthetically.

Alizarin is the main ingredient for the manufacture of the madder lake pigments known to painters as rose madder and alizarin crimson. Alizarin in the most common usage of the term has a deep red color, but the term is also part of the name for several related non-red dyes, such as Alizarine Cyanine Green and Alizarine Brilliant Blue. A use of alizarin in modern times is as a staining agent in biological research because it stains free calcium and certain calcium compounds a red or light purple color. Alizarin continues to be used commercially as a red textile dye, but to a lesser extent than in the past.

Alizarin is a strong inhibitor of CYP1A1, CYP1A2 and CYP1B1, as well as a weak inhibitor of CYP2A6 and CYP2E1.

== History ==
Madder has been cultivated as a dyestuff since antiquity in central Asia and Egypt, where it was grown as early as 1500 BC. Cloth dyed with madder root pigment was found in the tomb of the Pharaoh Tutankhamun, in the ruins of Pompeii, and ancient Athens and Corinth. In the Middle Ages, Charlemagne encouraged madder cultivation. Madder was widely used as a dye in Western Europe in the Late Medieval centuries. In 17th century England, alizarin was used as a red dye for the clothing of the parliamentary New Model Army. The distinctive red color would continue to be worn for centuries (though also produced by other dyes such as cochineal), giving English and later British soldiers the nickname of "redcoats".

alizarin color

The madder dyestuff is combined with a dye mordant. Depending on which mordant is used, the resulting color may be anywhere from pink through purple to dark brown. In the 18th century, the most valued color was a bright red known as "Turkey Red". The combination of mordants and overall technique used to obtain the Turkey Red originated in the Middle East or Turkey (hence the name). It was a complex and multi-step technique in its Middle Eastern formulation, some parts of which were unnecessary. The process was simplified in late 18th-century Europe. By 1804, dye maker George Field in Britain had refined a technique to make lake madder by treating it with alum, and an alkali, that converts the water-soluble madder extract into a solid, insoluble pigment. This resulting madder lake has a longer-lasting color, and can be used more efficaciously, for example by blending it into a paint. Over the following years, it was found that other metal salts, including those containing iron, tin, and chromium, could be used in place of alum to give madder-based pigments of various other colors. This general method of preparing lakes has been known for centuries but was simplified in the late 18th and early 19th centuries.

In 1826, the French chemist Pierre-Jean Robiquet found that madder root contained two colorants, the red alizarin and the more rapidly fading purpurin.

=== Age of synthetic alizarin ===
Alizarin became the first natural dye to be synthetically duplicated. In 1868 the German chemists Carl Graebe and Carl Liebermann, working for BASF, found a way to produce it from anthracene. The Bayer AG company draws its roots from alizarin as well. About the same time, the English dye chemist William Henry Perkin independently discovered the same synthesis, although the BASF group filed their patent before Perkin by one day. The subsequent discovery (made by Broenner and Gutzhow in 1871) that anthracene could be abstracted from coal tar further advanced the importance and affordability of alizarin's artificial synthesis. Synthetic alizarin can be produced for a fraction of the cost of the natural product, and the market for madder collapsed virtually overnight. One synthesis entailed bromination of anthraquinone to give 1,2-dibromoanthraquinone followed by substitution treatment of the latter with potassium hydroxide at 170 °C, and then followed by treatment with strong acid. It is now produced commercially by oxidation of anthraquinone or its sulfonate in alkali media.

Alizarin, as a dye, has been largely replaced today by the more light-resistant quinacridone pigments developed at DuPont in 1958.

== Structure and properties ==
1,4-Dihydroxyanthraquinone, also called quinizarin, is an isomer of alizarin.

Alizarin is one of ten dihydroxyanthraquinone isomers. It is soluble in hexane and chloroform, and can be obtained from the latter as red-purple crystals, melting point 277–278 °C.

Alizarin changes color depending on the pH of the solution it is in, thereby making it a pH indicator.

== Applications ==
Alizarin Red is used in a biochemical assay to determine, quantitatively by colorimetry, the presence of calcific deposition by cells of an osteogenic lineage. As such it is an early stage marker (days 10–16 of in vitro culture) of matrix mineralization, a crucial step towards the formation of calcified extracellular matrix associated with true bone.

Alizarin's abilities as a biological stain were first noted in 1567, when it was observed that when fed to animals, it stained their teeth and bones red. The chemical is now commonly used in medical studies involving calcium. Free (ionic) calcium forms precipitates with alizarin, and tissue block containing calcium stain red immediately when immersed in alizarin. Thus, both pure calcium and calcium in bones and other tissues can be stained. These alizarin-stained elements can be better visualized under fluorescent lights, excited by 440–460 nm. The process of staining calcium with alizarin works best when conducted in acidic solution (in many labs, it works better in pH 4.1 to 4.3).

In clinical practice, it is used to stain synovial fluid to assess for basic calcium phosphate crystals. Alizarin has also been used in studies involving bone growth, osteoporosis, bone marrow, calcium deposits in the vascular system, cellular signaling, gene expression, tissue engineering, and mesenchymal stem cells.

In geology, it is used as a stain to differentiate the calcium carbonate minerals, especially calcite and aragonite in thin section or polished surfaces.

Madder lake had been in use as a red pigment in paintings since antiquity.

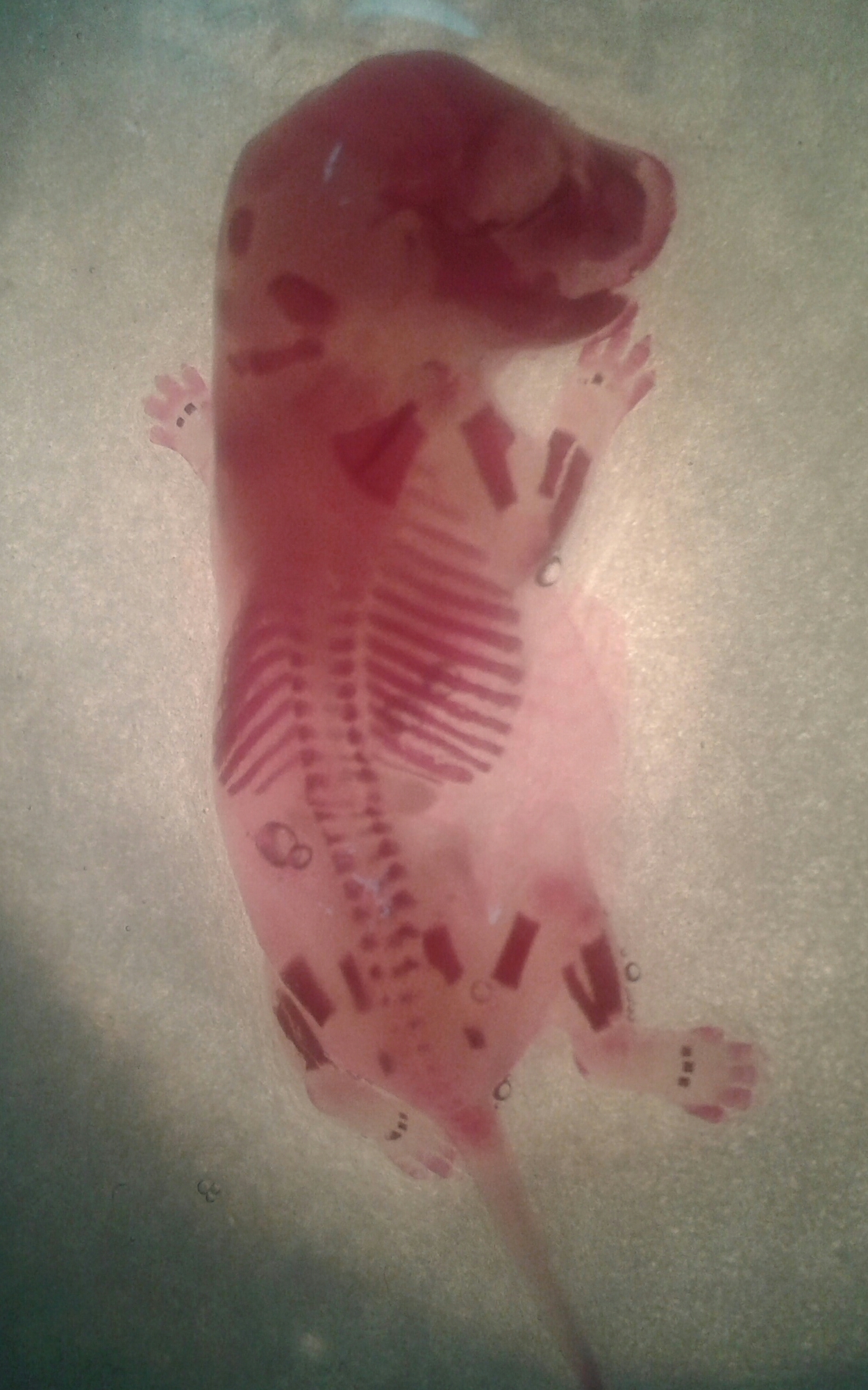
Red alizarin staining of rat's embryonic bones for osteogenesis study

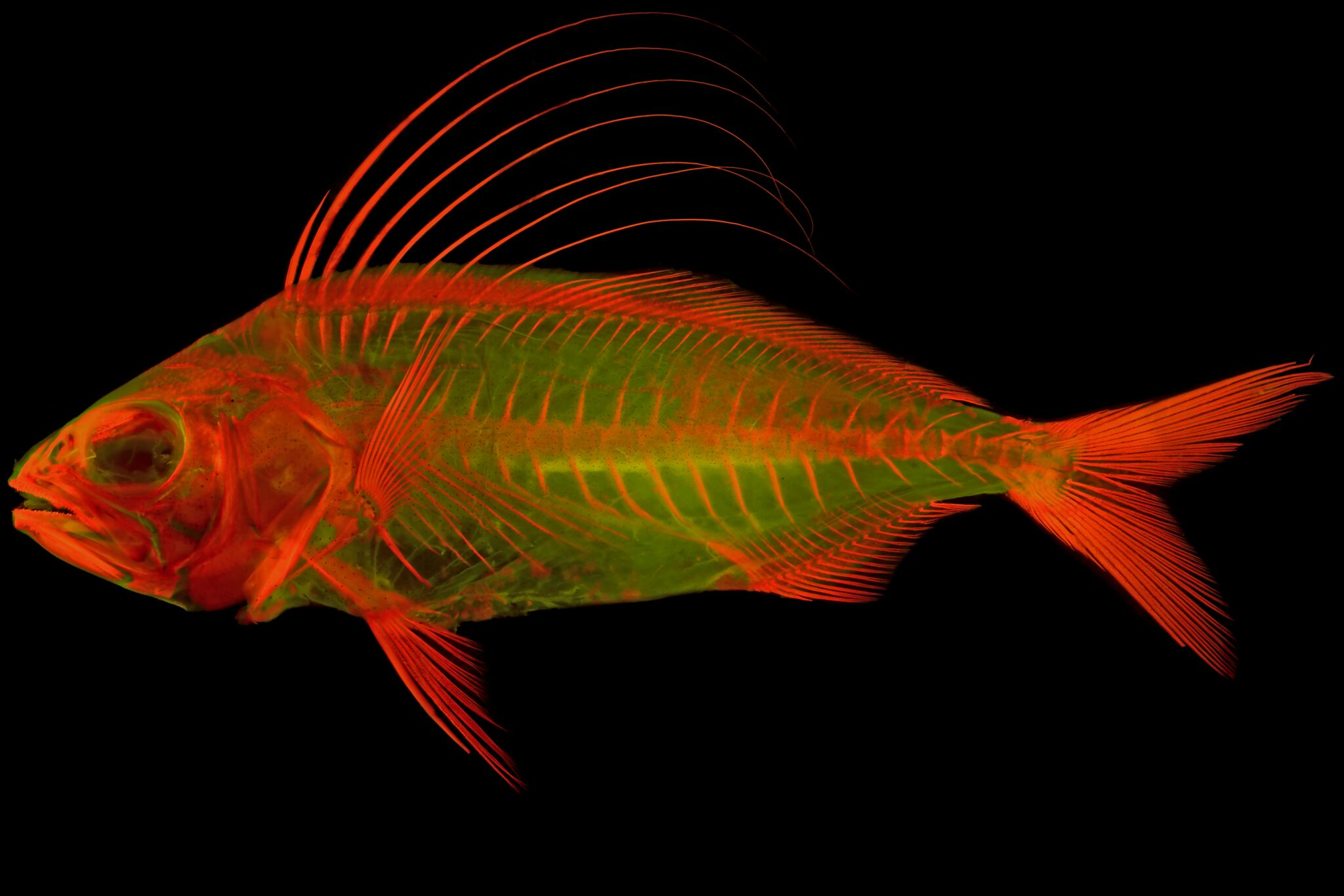
Red alizarin stained juvenile Roosterfish (Nematistius pectoralis) lit by fluorescent light.

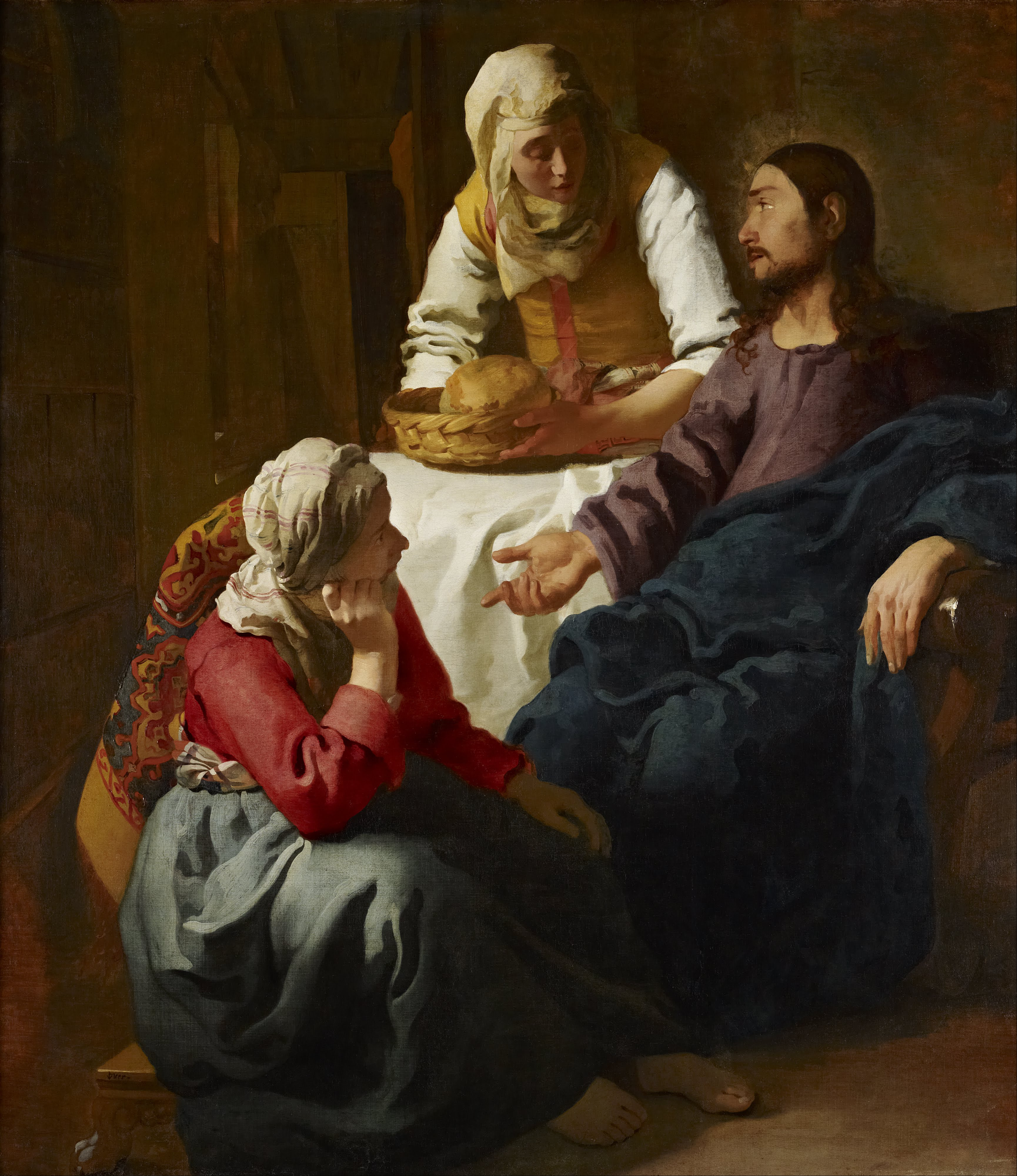
Johannes Vermeer, Christ in the House of Martha and Mary, 1654-56. The red jacket worn by Mary is painted in madder lake

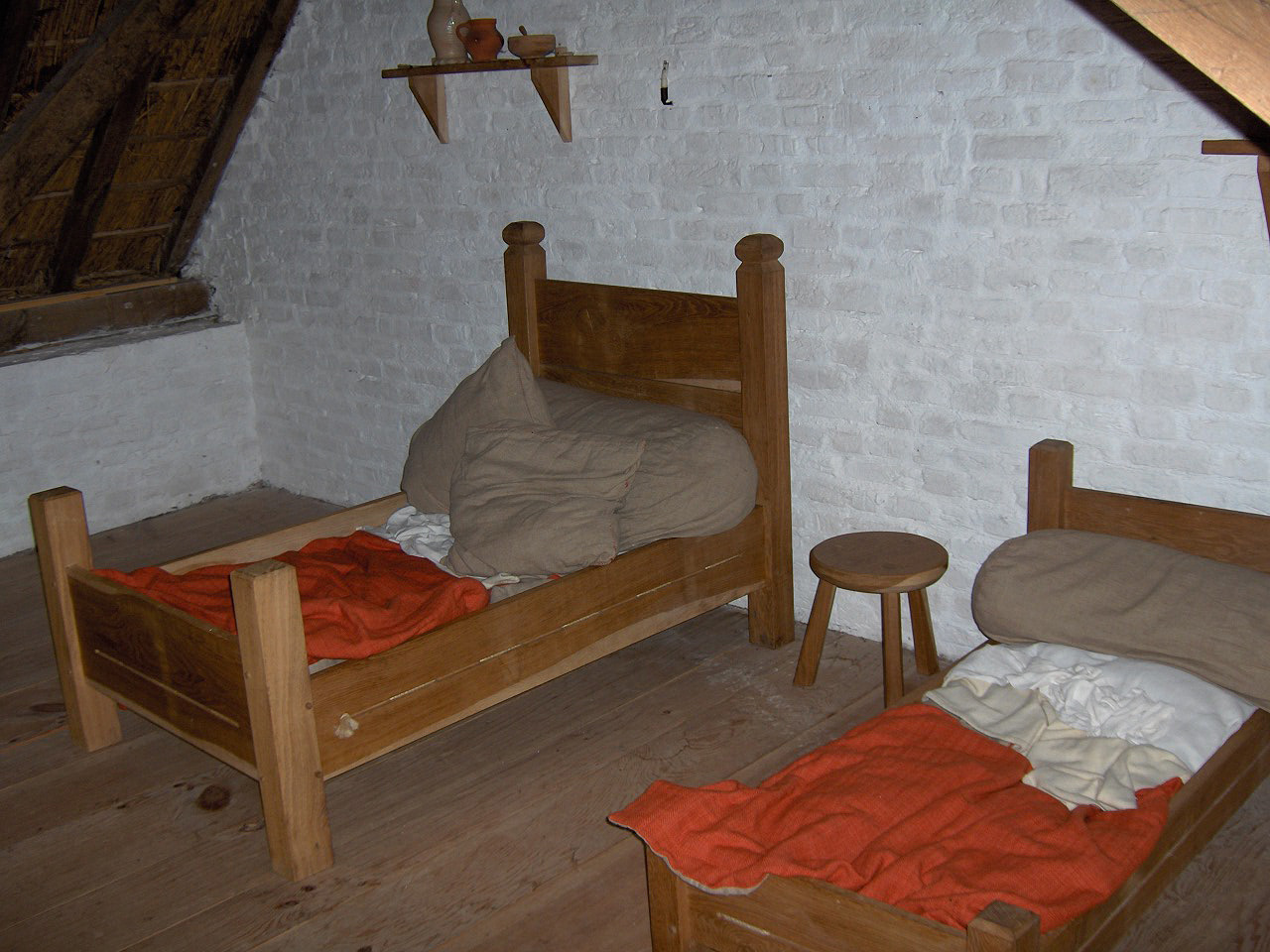
Reconstruction blankets dyed with madder

== See also ==
- 1,2,4-Trihydroxyanthraquinone or purpurin, another red dye that occurs in madder root
- Alizarine ink
- Aniline
- Dihydroxyanthraquinone
- Hydroxyanthraquinone
- List of colors (compact)
- List of dyes
- Diaphonization
- Red pigments
