= Carl Graebe =

German chemist (1841–1927)

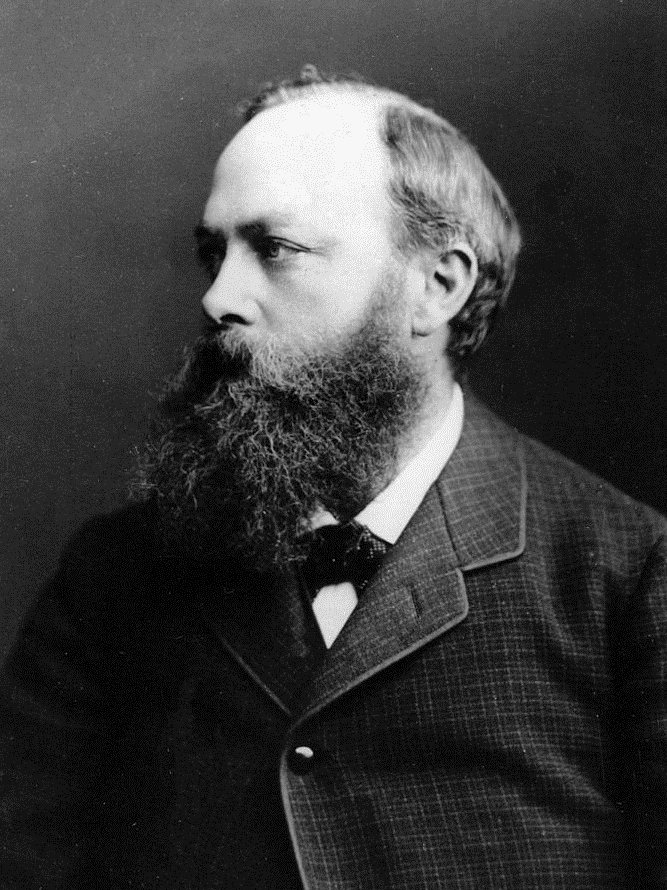
- Carl Graebe in the 1890s
- Born: 24 February 1841; Frankfurt am Main, Germany
- Died: 19 January 1927 (aged 85)
- Education: Karlsruhe Polytechnic; University of Heidelberg
- Scientific career
- Institutions: Hoechst AG; University of Leipzig; University of Königsberg; University of Geneva
- Doctoral advisor: Robert Wilhelm Bunsen
- Other academic advisors: Adolf von Baeyer
- Doctoral students: Vera Bogdanovskaia

Carl Graebe (German: [ˈɡʁɛːbə]; 24 February 1841 – 19 January 1927) was a German industrial and academic chemist from Frankfurt am Main who held professorships in his field at Leipzig, Königsberg, and Geneva. He is known for the first synthesis of the economically important dye, alizarin, with Liebermann, and for contributing to the fundamental nomenclature of organic chemistry.

== Biography ==
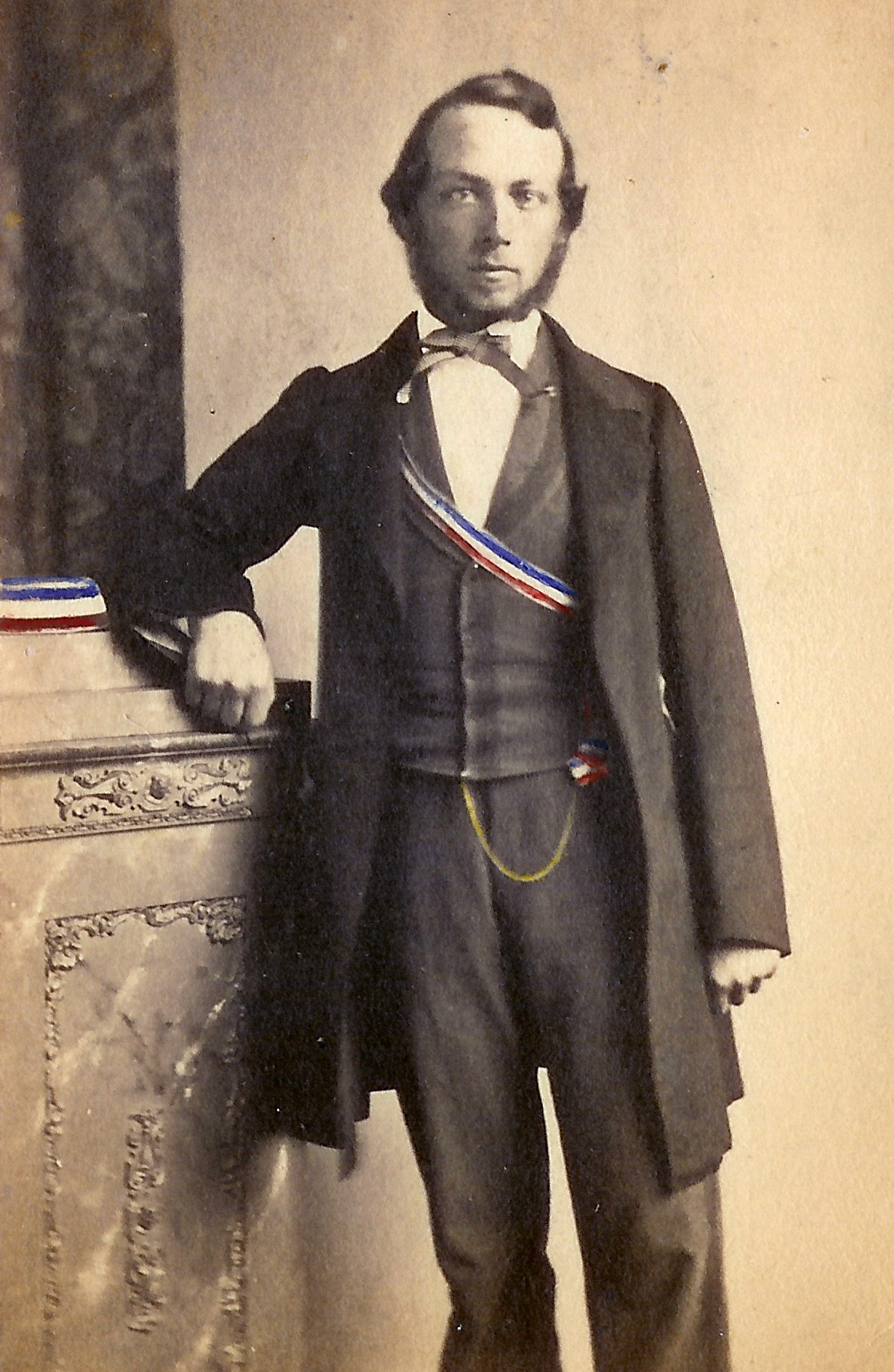
Carl Graebe in 1860

Graebe was born in Frankfurt in 1841. He studied at a vocational high school in Frankfurt and Karlsruhe Polytechnic and in Heidelberg. Later he worked for the chemical company Meister Lucius und Brüning (today Hoechst AG). He supervised the production of Fuchsine and researched violet colorants made using iodine. The work with iodine resulted in eye problems, so he returned to academia.

Carl Graebe received his Ph.D. from the University of Heidelberg in 1862 under the supervision of Robert Wilhelm Bunsen. In 1868 he wrote his habilitation, and became a professor in University of Leipzig. Graebe was Professor of Chemistry at the University of Königsberg from 1870 until 1877, and at the University of Geneva from 1878 until 1906. This was a period rich in the development of structural theory and nomenclature, and Graebe is known for introducing the "ortho", "meta" and "para" nomenclature for naphthalene ring substitution.

Amongst Graebe's students was Vera Bogdanovskaia, an early victim of the inherent risks of chemical research (dying as a result of later independent research on methylidynephosphane); her doctoral dissertation under Graebe was on dibenzyl ketone (1892).

Graebe synthesized the dye alizarin in 1868 with Carl Theodore Liebermann. Alizarin had been isolated from madder root some forty years earlier in 1826 by the French chemist Pierre Robiquet. Its chemical synthesis was a milestone in the development of the German and international dye industry, and foreshadowed collapse of the French agricultural sector that produced madder root (after synthesis became the more economical means of producing alizarin).

Graebe died in Frankfurt in 1927.
