= Carl Theodor Liebermann =

German chemist (1842–1914)

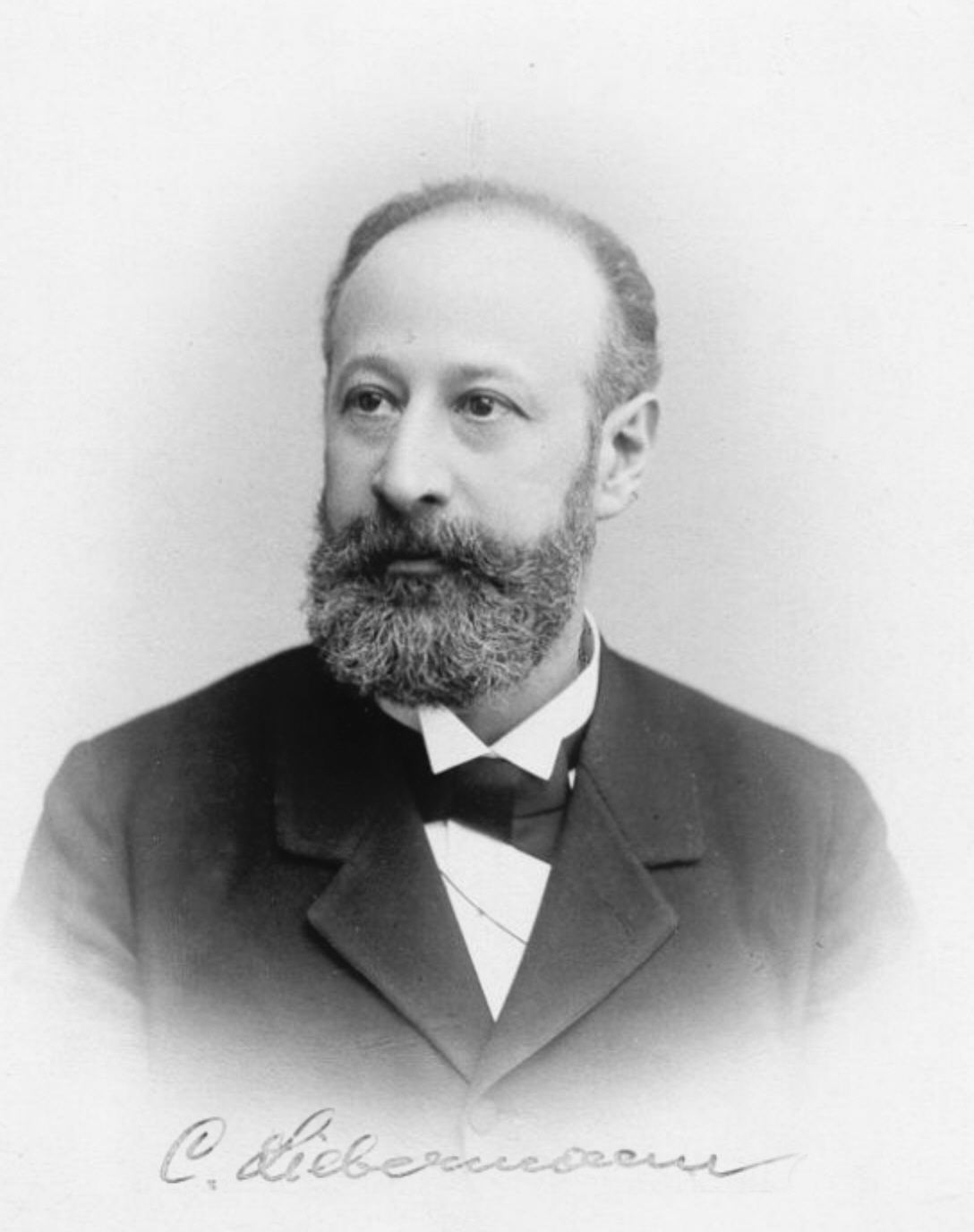
- Carl Theodor Liebermann
- Born: 23 February 1842; Berlin, Kingdom of Prussia, German Confederation
- Died: 28 December 1914 (aged 72); Berlin, Kingdom of Prussia, German Empire
- Education: University of Berlin
- Known for: Synthesis of Alizarin; Liebermann–Burchard test
- Scientific career
- Workplaces: University of Berlin
- Doctoral advisor: Robert Wilhelm Bunsen; Adolf von Baeyer

Signature
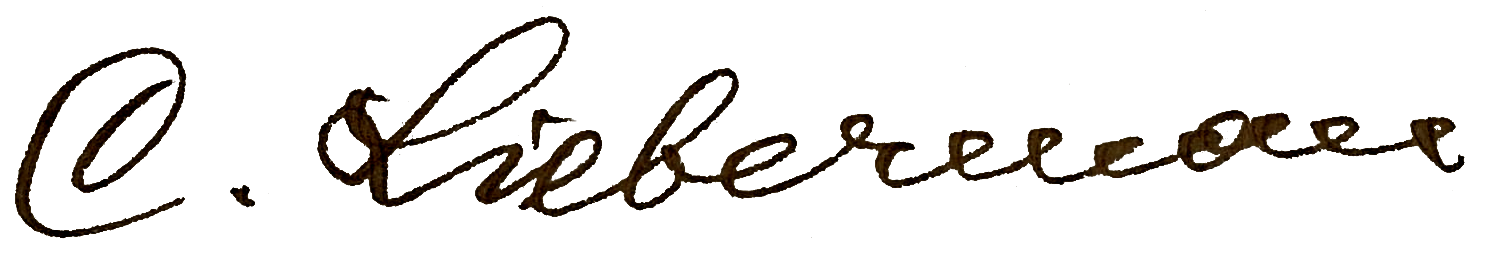

Carl Theodor Liebermann (23 February 1842 – 28 December 1914) was a German chemist and student of Adolf von Baeyer.

== Life ==
Liebermann first studied at the University of Heidelberg where Robert Wilhelm Bunsen was teaching. He then joined the group of Adolf von Baeyer at the University of Berlin where he received his PhD in 1865.

Together with Carl Gräbe, Liebermann synthesised the orange-red dye alizarin in 1868. After his habilitation in 1870 he became professor at the University of Berlin after Adolf von Baeyer left for the University of Strasbourg. He was elected to honorary membership of the Manchester Literary and Philosophical Society in 1892. Shortly after Liebermann retired, in 1914, he died.

== Work ==

In 1826, the French chemist Pierre Jean Robiquet had isolated from the root of a plant, madder, and defined the structure of, alizarin, a remarkable red dye. Liebermann's 1868 discovery that alizarin can be reduced to form anthracene, which is an abundant component in coal tar, opened the road for synthetic alizarin. The patent of Liebermann and Carl Gräbe for the synthesis of alizarin from anthracene was filed one day before the patent of William Henry Perkin. The synthesis is a chlorination or bromination of anthracene with a subsequent oxidation forming the alizarin.

== See also ==
- Pierre Jean Robiquet
- Carl Gräbe
- William Henry Perkin
