= Lake pigment =

Pigment made by precipitating a dye with an inert binder, or mordant

A lake pigment is a pigment made by precipitating a dye with an inert binder, or mordant, usually a metallic salt. Lake pigments are largely chemically organic. Manufacturers and suppliers to artists and industry frequently omit the lake designation in the name. Many lake pigments are fugitive because the dyes involved are not lightfast. Red lakes were particularly important in Renaissance and Baroque paintings; they were often used as translucent glazes to portray the colors of rich fabrics and draperies.

== Etymology ==
The term lake is derived from the term lac, the secretions of the Indian wood insect Kerria lacca (formerly Laccifer lacca or Coccus lacca). It has the same root as the word lacquer, and comes originally from the Hindi word lakh, through the Arabic word lakk and the Persian word lak.

== Chemistry ==
A typical lake pigment: Lithol Rubine BK

Many modern lake pigments are azo dyes. They characteristically have sulfonate and sometimes carboxylate substituents, which confer negative charge to the chromophore (colored species).

The metallic salts or binders used are typically colourless or almost so. The organic component of the dye determines the color of the resulting precipitate. The metallic salts that induce the formation of lakes are typically salts of dications such as Ca^{2+} or Sr^{2+}. The resulting lake pigment can be diluted with an inert material such as alumina.

== History and art ==
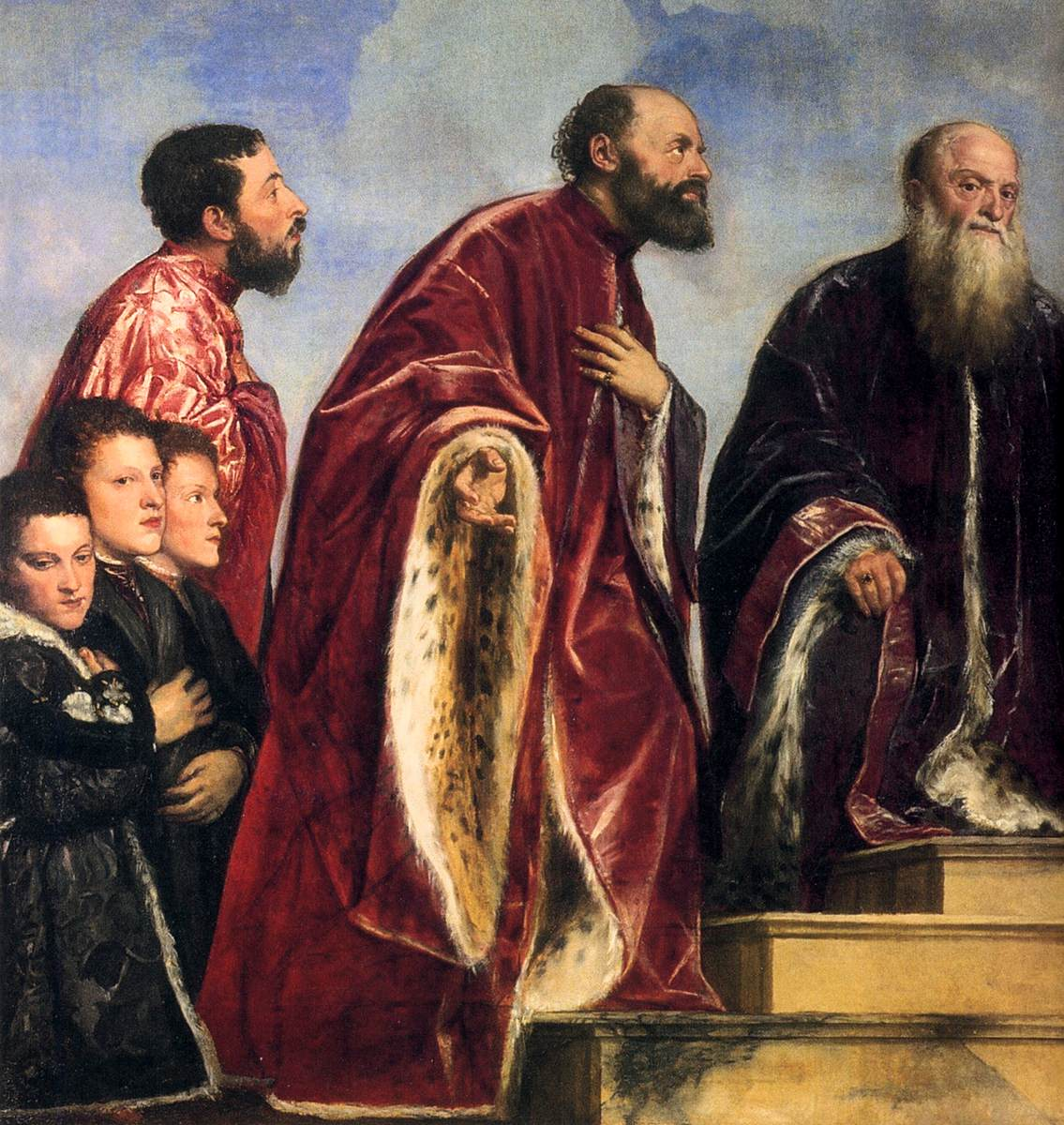
Titian used glazes of red lake to create the vivid crimson of the robes in The Vendramin Family Venerating a Relic of the True Cross, c. 1550–1560 (detail).

Lake pigments have a long history in decoration and the arts. Some have been produced for thousands of years and traded over long distances. In ancient times chalk, white clay, and crushed bones were used as sources of the calcium salts.

The red lakes were particularly important in the history of art; because they were translucent, they were often used in layers of glazes over a more opaque red (sometimes the mineral-based pigment vermilion, or sometimes a red lake mixed with lead white or vermilion) to create a deep, rich red color. They are common in paintings by Venetian artists of the 16th century, including Titian, to depict fine draperies and fabrics.

- Rose madder lake, originally from the root of the madder plant, is also known as alizarin crimson in its synthetic form. Since rose madder is fugitive when exposed to light, its use has been largely superseded, even in synthetic form, by quinacridone pigments.
- Carmine lake, also called crimson lake, was originally produced from the cochineal insect, native to Central and South America. When Spanish colonizers encountered the Aztec Empire, they encountered Aztec warriors garbed in an unknown crimson color. Cochineal became the second most valuable export from the Spanish colonies in the Americas after silver, and the Spanish zealously guarded the secret of its production for centuries. Carminic acid, the organic compound which gives carmine its color, was synthesized in 1991. Researchers in 2022 were examining the potential to genetically engineer microbes to produce carminic acid.

Rose madder is now produced more cheaply from synthetic sources, although some use of natural products persists, especially among artisans. The food and cosmetics industries have shown renewed interest in cochineal as a source of natural red dye.
