= Hydroxyquinone =

Class of chemical compounds

2-Hydroxy-
1,4-benzoquinone
(Hydroxyquinone)

Hydroxyquinone often refers to a hydroxybenzoquinone, any organic compound with formula C_{6}H_{4}O_{3} which can be viewed as a derivative of a benzoquinone through replacement of one hydrogen atom (H) by a hydroxyl group (-OH). When unqualified, the terms usually mean specifically the compound 2-hydroxy-1,4-benzoquinone, derived from 1,4-benzoquinone. That parent is sometimes simply called quinone, and this is the only hydroxy derivative of it.

More generally, the term may refer to any derivative of any quinone (such as 1,2-benzoquinone, 1,4-naphthoquinone or 9,10-anthraquinone), where any number n of hydrogens have been replaced by n hydroxyls. In this case the number n is indicated by a multiplier prefix (mono-, di-, tri-, etc.), and the parent quinone's name is used instead of just "quinone" — as in tetrahydroxy-1,4-benzoquinone.

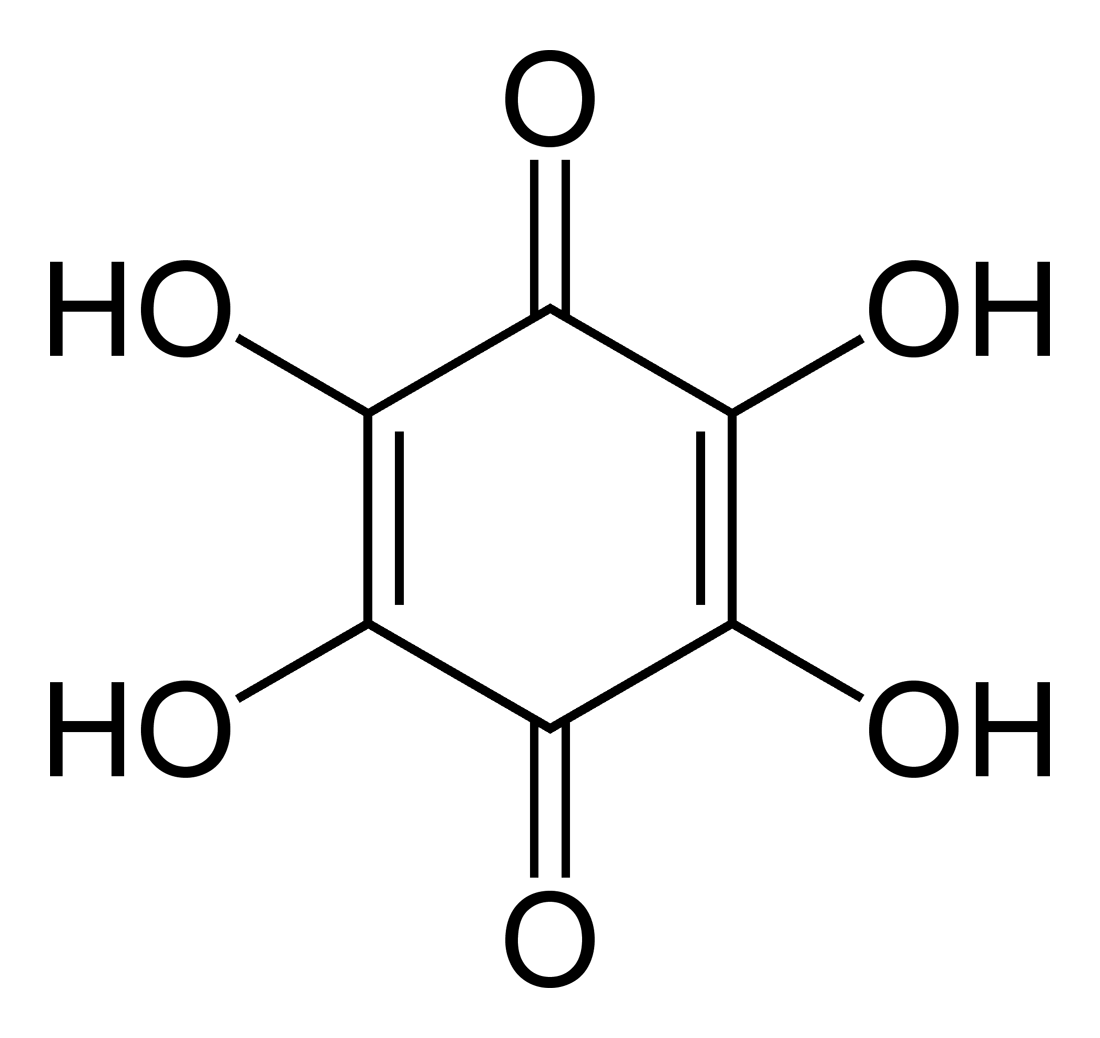
Tetrahydroxy-
1,4-benzoquinone

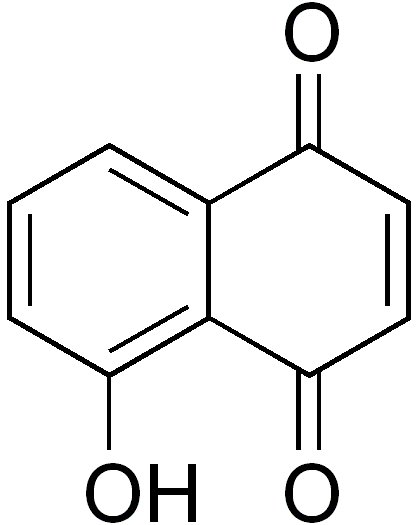
5-Hydroxy-
1,4-naphthoquinone
(Juglone)

1,2-Dihydroxy-
9,10-anthraquinone
(Alizarin)

The hydroxyquinones (in the particular or the general sense) include many biologically and industrially important compounds, and are a building block of many medicinal drugs.

Hydroxyquinones with hydroxyls adjacent to the ketone groups often exhibit intramolecular hydrogen bonding, which affects their redox properties and their biochemical properties.

== Subfamilies ==
- Hydroxybenzoquinones
- Hydroxynaphthoquinones
- Hydroxyanthraquinones
