= Dihydroxyanthraquinone =

A dihydroxyanthraquinone is any of several isomeric organic compounds with formula (C_{12}H_{6}(OH)_{2})(CO)_{2}, formally derived from 9,10-anthraquinone by replacing two hydrogen atoms by hydroxyl groups. Dihyroxyantraquinones have been studied since the early 1900s, and include some compounds of historical and current importance. The isomers differ in the position of the hydroxyl groups, and of the carbonyl oxygens (=O) of the underlying anthraquinone.

== Isomers ==
=== From 9,10-anthraquinone ===
The unqualified term "dihydroxyanthraquinone" usually means a hydroxy derivative of 9,10-anthraquinone. The dihydroxy-9,10-anthraquinone functional group occurs widely in natural products, and is an important feature of the anthracycline antitumour antibiotics. In particular, 1,8-Dihydroxy-9,10-anthraquinone is the precursor for the important topical antipsoriatic drug anthralin, 1,8-dihydroxy-9-anthrone,

There are 28 ways of choosing two of the 8 possible hydrogens, but because of the four-fold symmetry of the 9,10-anthraquinone core there are only 10 distinct isomers.

- 1,2-Dihydroxyanthraquinone (alizarin)
- 1,3-Dihydroxyanthraquinone (purpuroxanthin, xanthopurpurin)
- 1,4-Dihydroxyanthraquinone (quinizarin)
- 1,5-Dihydroxyanthraquinone (anthrarufin)
- 1,6-Dihydroxyanthraquinone
- 1,7-Dihydroxyanthraquinone
- 1,8-Dihydroxyanthraquinone (dantron, chrysazin)
- 2,3-Dihydroxyanthraquinone (histazarin)
- 2,6-Dihydroxyanthraquinone (anthraflavic acid)
- 2,7-Dihydroxyanthraquinone (isoanthraflavic acid)

=== From other anthraquinones ===
There are also many dihydroxy derivatives of other anthraquinones, such as 1,2-anthraquinone, 1,4-anthraquinone, and 2,6-anthraquinone.

== See also ==
- Hydroxyquinone
- Hydroxybenzoquinone
- Hydroxynaphthoquinone
- Hydroxyanthraquinone
- Trihydroxyanthraquinone
- Tetrahydroxyanthraquinone
- Pentahydroxyanthraquinone
- Hexahydroxyanthraquinone
- Heptahydroxyanthraquinone
- Octahydroxyanthraquinone
