= 1,3,8-Trihydroxyanthraquinone =

- Skeletal formula

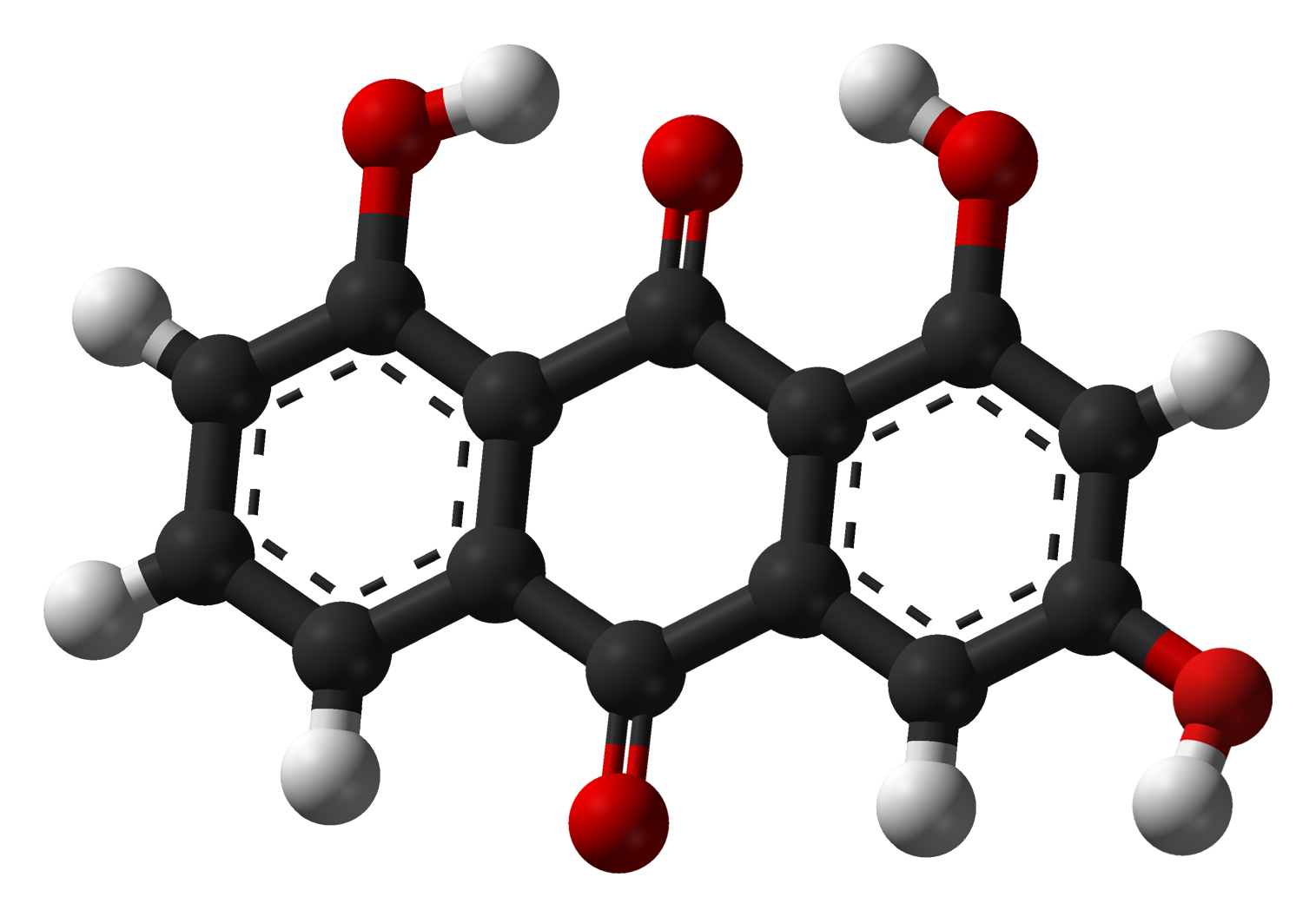
- Ball-and-stick model

Names
- Preferred IUPAC name 1,3,8-Trihydroxyanthracene-9,10-dione

Identifiers
CAS Number	52431-74-0
3D model (JSmol)	Interactive image
ChemSpider	32683235
PubChem CID	12435249
UNII	CZ3VFD7G4S
CompTox Dashboard (EPA)	DTXSID50498175
- InChI: InChI=1S/C14H8O5/c15-6-4-8-12(10(17)5-6)14(19)11-7(13(8)18)2-1-3-9(11)16/h1-5,15-17H Key: VVEKCQAFOLKNKB-UHFFFAOYSA-N
- SMILES: O=C1C2=C(C=C(O)C=C2O)C(C3=CC=CC(O)=C31)=O

Properties
Chemical formula	C_{14}H_{8}O_{5}
Molar mass	256.213 g·mol^{−1}
- Except where otherwise noted, data are given for materials in their standard state (at 25 °C [77 °F], 100 kPa). verify (what is ?) Infobox references

1,3,8-Trihydroxyanthraquinone is an organic compound. It is one of many trihydroxyanthraquinone isomers, formally derived from anthraquinone by replacement of three hydrogen atoms by hydroxyl (OH) groups.

The compound occurs in some microorganisms and in alcoholic extracts of the wood of the South American plant Senna reticulata (mangerioba grande or maria mole in Portuguese), used in the local folk medicine for liver problems and rheumatism. The extract also contained, among other products chrysophanol (1,8-dihydroxy-3-methylanthraquinone), physcion (1,8-dihydroxy-3-methyl-6-methoxyanthraquinone), aloe-emodin (3-carbinol-1,8-dihydroxyanthraquinone), lunatin (3-methoxy-1,6,8-trihydroxyanthraquinone), emodin (6-methyl-1,3,8-trihydroxyanthraquinone), and chrysophanol-10,10'-bianthrone.

The substance is soluble in ethanol and chloroform but not in n-hexane, and melts at 283 °C.

== See also ==
- Trihydroxyanthraquinone
- Hydroxyanthraquinone
