= Hydroxybenzoquinone =

Group of organic compounds

A hydroxybenzoquinone (formula: C_{6}H_{4}O_{3}) is any of several organic compounds that can be viewed as derivatives of a benzoquinone through replacement of one hydrogen atom (H) by a hydroxyl group (-OH).

In general, the term may mean any benzoquinone derivative where any number n of hydrogens have been replaced by n hydroxyls, so that the formula is C_{6}H_{4}O_{2+n}. In this case the number n (which is between 1 and 4) is indicated by a multiplier prefix (mono-, di-, tri-, tetra-, penta-, or hexa-).

The unqualified term "hydroxybenzoquinone" usually means a derivative of 1,4-benzoquinone. Other hydroxy- compounds can be derived from the other isomer, namely 1,2-benzoquinone or ortho-benzoquinone. The IUPAC nomenclature uses dihydrobenzenedione instead of "benzoquinone", with the necessary prefixes to indicate the positions of the carbonyl oxygens (=O) — as in 2,3-dihydroxy-1a,4a-dihydrobenzene-1,4-dione (= 2,3-dihydroxy-1,4-benzoquinone).

The hydroxybenzoquinones (in the particular or the general sense) include many biologically and industrially important compounds, and are a building block of many medicinal drugs.

== List of compounds ==
=== From 1,4-benzoquinone ===
Due to the symmetry of the 1,4-benzoquinone (para-benzoquinone) core, there is only one distinct isomer with 1, 3, or 4 substituted hydroxyls, and three isomers with 2 hydroxyls:

- 2-Hydroxy-1,4-benzoquinone (C_{6}H_{4}O_{3})
- 2,3-Dihydroxy-1,4-benzoquinone (C_{6}H_{4}O_{4})
- 2,5-Dihydroxy-1,4-benzoquinone (C_{6}H_{4}O_{4})
- 2,6-Dihydroxy-1,4-benzoquinone (C_{6}H_{4}O_{4})
- 2,3,5-Trihydroxy-1,4-benzoquinone (C_{6}H_{4}O_{5})
- 2,3,5,6-Tetrahydroxy-1,4-benzoquinone (C_{6}H_{4}O_{6})

=== From 1,2-benzoquinone ===
From the less symmetrical 1,2-benzoquinone (ortho-benzoquinone) there are 9 possible isomers:

- 3-Hydroxy-1,2-benzoquinone (C_{6}H_{4}O_{3})
- 4-Hydroxy-1,2-benzoquinone (C_{6}H_{4}O_{3})
- 3,4-Dihydroxy-1,2-benzoquinone (C_{6}H_{4}O_{4})
- 3,5-Dihydroxy-1,2-benzoquinone (C_{6}H_{4}O_{4})
- 3,6-Dihydroxy-1,2-benzoquinone (C_{6}H_{4}O_{4})
- 4,5-Dihydroxy-1,2-benzoquinone (C_{6}H_{4}O_{4})
- 3,4,5-Trihydroxy-1,2-benzoquinone (C_{6}H_{4}O_{5})
- 3,4,6-Trihydroxy-1,2-benzoquinone (C_{6}H_{4}O_{5})
- 3,4,5,6-Tetrahydroxy-1,2-benzoquinone (C_{6}H_{4}O_{6})

== See also ==
- Chloranilic acid (2,5-dichloro-3,6,-dihydroxy-1,4-benzoquinone)
- Hydroxynaphthoquinone
- Hydroxyanthraquinone
- Hydroxyquinone
- C6H4O3
- C6H4O4
- C6H4O5
- C6H4O6
