= C14H8O4 =

The molecular formula C_{14}H_{8}O_{4} (molar mass : 240.21 g/mol) may refer to:

- Alizarin, a prominent dye
- Dantron, an anthraquinone derivative
- 1,3-Dihydroxyanthraquinone
- 1,4-Dihydroxyanthraquinone
- Napabucasin (BBI-608)
