= C14H8O8 =

The molecular formula C_{14}H_{8}O_{8} (molar mass : 304.21 g/mol) may refer to:

- Hexahydroxyanthraquinones
  - Rufigallol, 1,2,3,5,6,7-hexahydroxy-9,10-anthraquinone
  - Alizarin cyanine R, 1,2,4,5,7,8-Hexahydroxy-9,10-anthracenedione
