= 2,5-Dihydroxy-1,4-benzoquinone =

Skeletal formula of 2,5-dihydroxy-1,4-benzoquinone
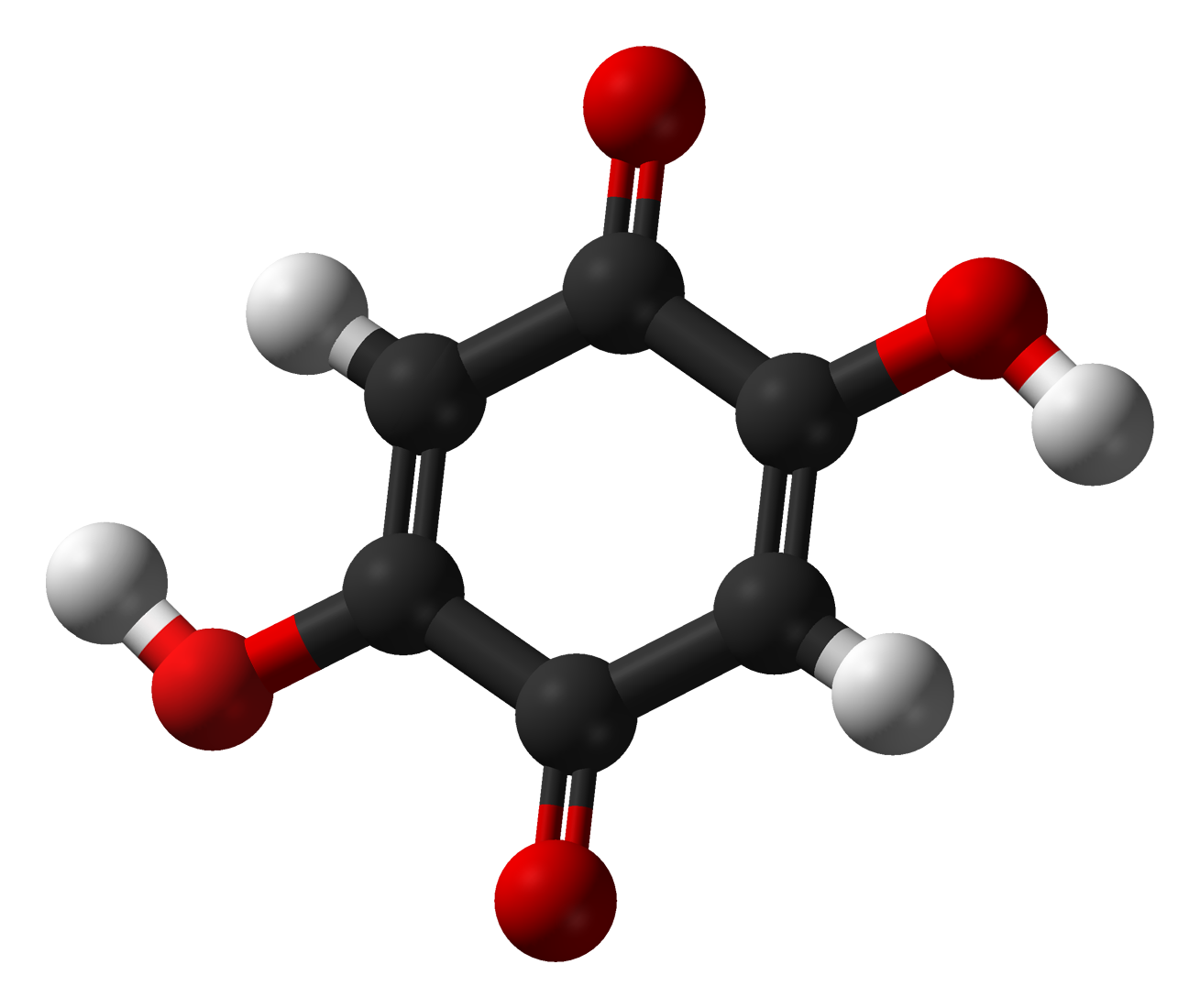
Ball-and-stick model of 2,5-dihydroxy-1,4-benzoquinone

Names
- Preferred IUPAC name 2,5-Dihydroxycyclohexa-2,5-diene-1,4-dione
- Other names: 2,5-Dihydroxybenzoquinone; 2,5-Dihydroxy-p-benzoquinone; Anilic acid

Identifiers
CAS Number	615-94-1
3D model (JSmol)	Interactive image; Interactive image
ChemSpider	62426
ECHA InfoCard	100.009.505
PubChem CID	69213
UNII	0KG5HVB52Z
CompTox Dashboard (EPA)	DTXSID4060658
- InChI: InChI=1S/C6H4O4/c7-3-1-4(8)6(10)2-5(3)9/h1-2,7,10H Key: QFSYADJLNBHAKO-UHFFFAOYSA-N; InChI=1/C6H4O4/c7-3-1-4(8)6(10)2-5(3)9/h1-2,7,10H Key: QFSYADJLNBHAKO-UHFFFAOYAW
- SMILES: C1=C(C(=O)C=C(C1=O)O)O; O=C\1C(\O)=C/C(=O)C(/O)=C/1

Properties
Chemical formula	C_{6}H_{4}O_{4}
Molar mass	140.094 g·mol^{−1}
Appearance	yellow solid
Melting point	210 to 212 °C (410 to 414 °F; 483 to 485 K)
Acidity (pK_{a})	pK_{a1} = 2.71 pK_{a2} = 5.18

Hazards
- GHS labelling
Pictograms	(GHS07: Exclamation mark)
Signal word	Warning
Hazard statements	H302, H312, H315, H319, H332, H335
Precautionary statements	P261, P264, P264+P265, P270, P271, P280, P301+P317, P302+P352, P304+P340, P305+P351+P338, P317, P319, P321, P330, P332+P317, P337+P317, P362+P364, P403+P233, P405, P501

Related compounds
Related compounds	Hydroxy-1,4-benzoquinone; Tetrahydroxy-1,4-benzoquinone
- Except where otherwise noted, data are given for materials in their standard state (at 25 °C [77 °F], 100 kPa). verify (what is ?) Infobox references

2,5-Dihydroxy-1,4-benzoquinone or 2,5-dihydroxy-para-benzoquinone is an organic compound with chemical formula C_{6}H_{4}O_{4}, formally derived from 1,4-benzoquinone by replacing two hydrogen atoms with hydroxyl (OH) groups. It is one of seven dihydroxybenzoquinone isomers. It is a yellow solid with planar molecules that exhibits ferroelectric properties.

The compound is a weak acid: one or both hydroxyls can lose a proton to yield the anions C_{6}H_{3}O^{−}_{4} (pK_{a1} = 2.71) and C_{6}H_{2}O^{2−}_{4} (pK_{a2} = 5.18), respectively. The latter forms a variety of metal complexes, functioning as a binucleating ligand.

The compound has been identified as partly responsible for the color of aged cellulosic materials.
