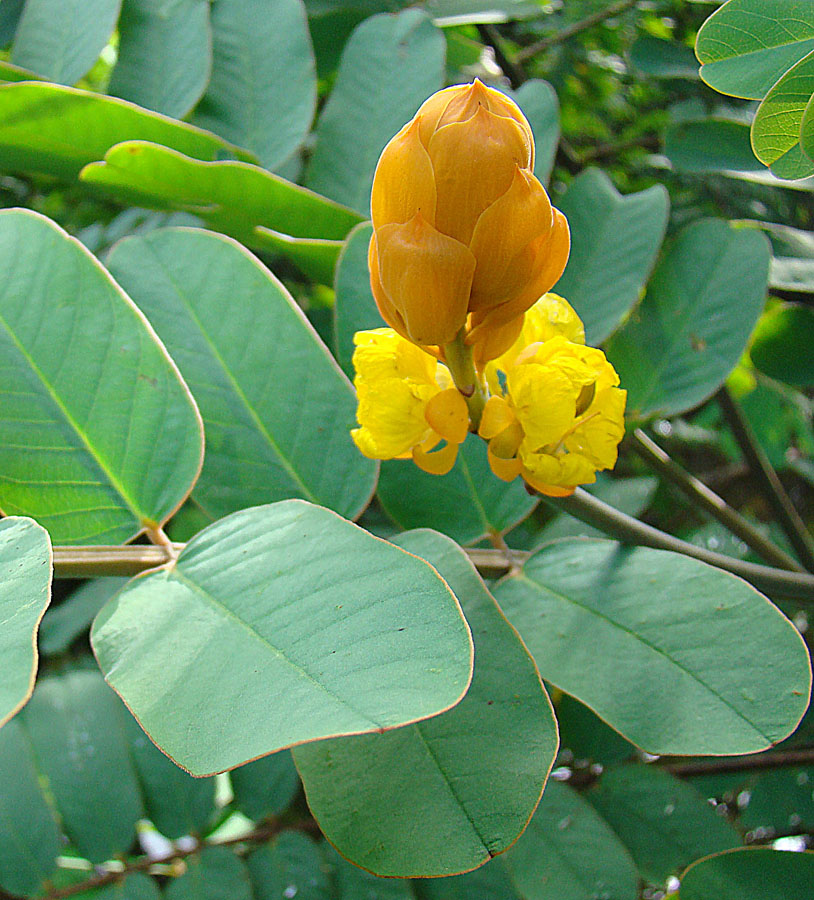

Scientific classification
- Kingdom: Plantae
- Clade: Tracheophytes
- Clade: Angiosperms
- Clade: Eudicots
- Clade: Rosids
- Order: Fabales
- Family: Fabaceae
- Subfamily: Caesalpinioideae
- Genus: Senna
- Species: S. reticulata

Binomial name
- Senna reticulata (Willd.) H.S.Irwin and Barneby

Synonyms
- Cassia alata L.; Cassia reticulata Willd.

= Senna reticulata =

Species of legume

Senna reticulata, the mangerioba grande or maria mole in Portuguese, is a pioneer tree species found on highly fertile floodplains in South America. It has some medicinal uses, but is regarded by farmers as a noxious weed, named matapasto (meadow killer) due to its ability to grow fast and outshade neighbouring plants.

== Uses ==
It is used in the local folk medicine for liver problems and rheumatism. 1,3,8-Trihydroxyanthraquinone is an organic compound found in alcoholic extracts of the wood of the plant. The extract also contains, among other products chrysophanol (1,8-dihydroxy-3-methylanthraquinone), physcion (1,8-dihydroxy-3-methyl-6-methoxyanthraquinone), aloe-emodin (3-carbinol-1,8-dihydroxyanthraquinone), lunatin (3-methoxy-1,6,8-trihydroxyanthraquinone), emodin (6-methyl-1,3,8-trihydroxyanthraquinone), and chrysophanol-10,10'-bianthrone. The xanthonoid cassiaxanthone can be found in S. reticulata as well as the anthraquinone rhein.

== Growth ==
Senna reticulata has a "unique capacity to colonize open areas". It is extremely flood tolerant, fast growing and is difficult to eradicate, the recommended method being to cut it at the base, burn the stump and then flood the roots.
