= C6H4O3 =

The molecular formula C_{6}H_{4}O_{3} may refer to the following:

- 2,5-Furandicarboxaldehyde
- Hydroxy-1,4-benzoquinone

== See also ==
- Hydroxybenzoquinone
