= 1,4-Dihydroxyanthraquinone =

- Skeletal formula

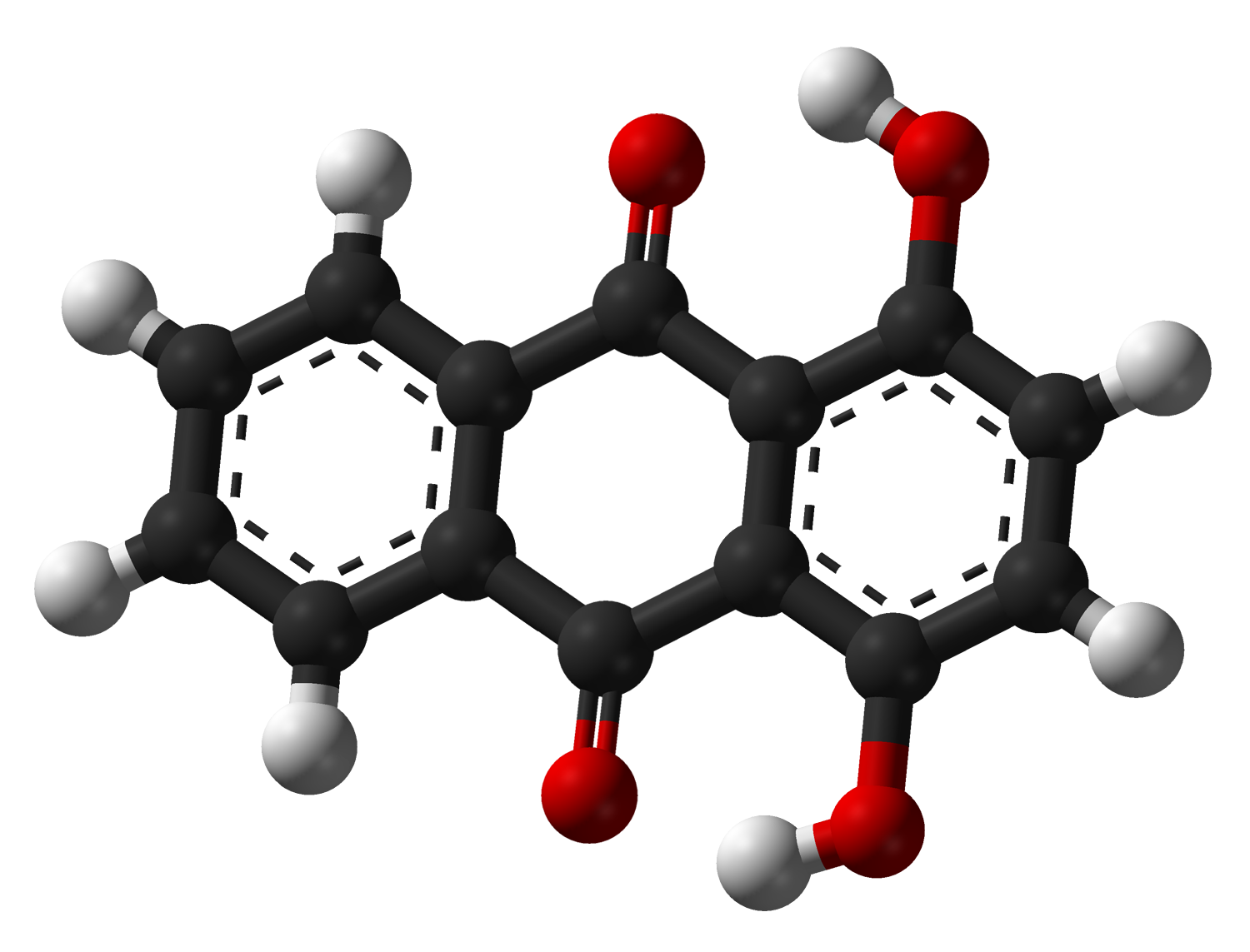
- Ball-and-stick model

Names
- Preferred IUPAC name 1,4-Dihydroxyanthracene-9,10-dione
- Other names Quinizarin; Solvent Orange 86

Identifiers
CAS Number	81-64-1
3D model (JSmol)	Interactive image
ChEBI	CHEBI:37487
ChEMBL	ChEMBL17594
ChemSpider	6433
ECHA InfoCard	100.001.245
PubChem CID	6688
UNII	8S496ZV3CS
CompTox Dashboard (EPA)	DTXSID8044464
- InChI: InChI=1S/C14H8O4/c15-9-5-6-10(16)12-11(9)13(17)7-3-1-2-4-8(7)14(12)18/h1-6,15-16H Key: GUEIZVNYDFNHJU-UHFFFAOYSA-N; InChI=1/C14H8O4/c15-9-5-6-10(16)12-11(9)13(17)7-3-1-2-4-8(7)14(12)18/h1-6,15-16H Key: GUEIZVNYDFNHJU-UHFFFAOYAX
- SMILES: O=C2c1ccccc1C(=O)c3c2c(O)ccc3O

Properties
Chemical formula	C_{14}H_{8}O_{4}
Molar mass	240.21 g/mol
Appearance	Orange or red-brown crystalline powder
Melting point	198 to 199 °C (388 to 390 °F; 471 to 472 K)
Boiling point	450 °C (842 °F; 723 K)
- Except where otherwise noted, data are given for materials in their standard state (at 25 °C [77 °F], 100 kPa). verify (what is ?) Infobox references

1,4-Dihydroxyanthraquinone, also called quinizarin or Solvent Orange 86, is a chromogenic organic compound derived from anthraquinone. Quinizarin is an orange or red-brown crystalline powder. It is formally derived from anthraquinone by replacement of two hydrogen atoms by hydroxyl (OH) groups. It is one of ten dihydroxyanthraquinone isomers and occurs in small amounts (as a glycoside) in the root of the madder plant, Rubia tinctorum.

== Production ==
Quinizarin is produced by the reaction of phthalic anhydride and 4-chlorophenol followed by hydrolysis of the chloride:

Summary equation for one synthesis of alizarin.[sic.]

It can also be prepared less efficiently from phthalic anhydride and hydroquinone.

== Industrial ==
Quinizarin is an inexpensive dye that is used to color gasoline and some heating oils. It is used as an intermediate for the synthesis of indanthrene- and alizarin-derived dyes. The OH groups can be replaced by chloride. Chlorination and bromination afford other dyes. Amination (replacement of one OH by ArNH) with aniline derivatives followed by sulfonation affords other dyes such as Acid Violet 43. It is also used to form lake pigments with calcium, barium, and lead.

== Analytical Chemistry ==
In a dimethyl sulfoxide medium with the presence of sodium hydroxide and sodium carbonate, quinizarin reacts with lithium cations to produce a blue-violet color. This has been proposed as a method for the spectrophotometric determination of lithium in blood and human serum, as an alternative to the highly toxic organoarsenic reagent thorin.

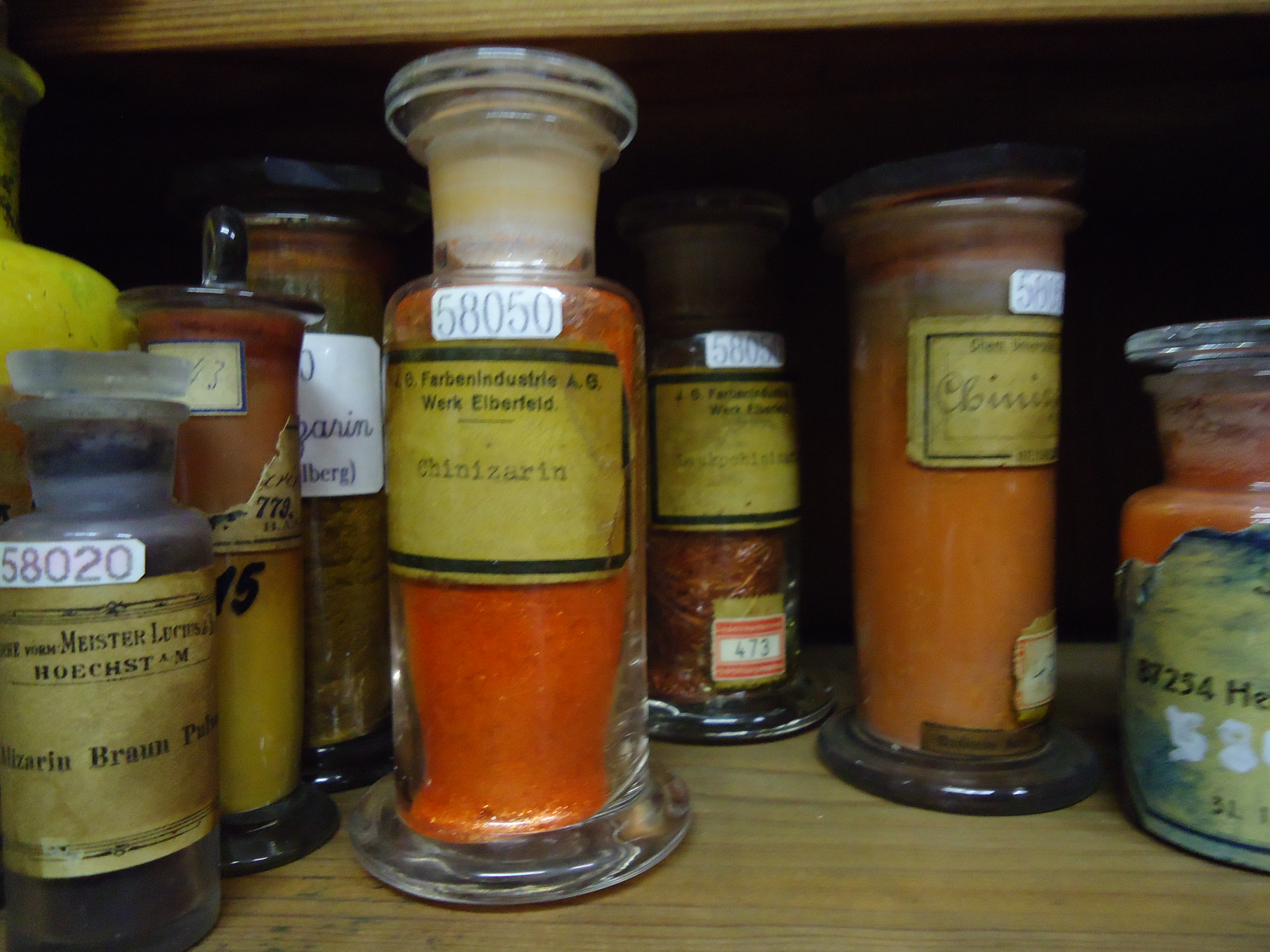
Quinizarin sample (Historic Dye Collection of TU Dresden).

== See also ==
- Hydroxyanthraquinone
- 1,2-Dihydroxyanthraquinone (alizarin)
- 1,3-Dihydroxyanthraquinone (purpuroxanthin)
- Trihydroxyanthraquinone
- Quinalizarin (1,2,5,8-tetrahydroxyanthraquinone)
