= 2-hydroxy-1,4-benzoquinone reductase =

Class of enzymes

Identifiers
- EC no.: 1.6.5.7

Databases
- IntEnz: IntEnz view
- BRENDA: BRENDA entry
- ExPASy: NiceZyme view
- KEGG: KEGG entry
- MetaCyc: metabolic pathway
- PRIAM: profile
- PDB structures: RCSB PDB PDBe PDBsum
- Gene Ontology: AmiGO / QuickGO
Search
- PMC: articles
- PubMed: articles
- NCBI: proteins

2-hydroxy-1,4-benzoquinone reductase (EC 1.6.5.7) is an enzyme that catalyzes the chemical reaction

hydroxy-1,4-benzoquinone
+ NADH
H^{+}
H^{+}
hydroxyquinol
+ NAD^{+}

The three substrates of this enzyme are hydroxy-1,4-benzoquinone, reduced nicotinamide adenine dinucleotide (NADH), and a proton. Its products are hydroxyquinol and oxidised NAD^{+}.

This enzyme participates in the metabolism of 2,4,5-trichlorophenoxyacetic acid in the bacteria Burkholderia cepacia.

== Nomenclature ==
This enzyme belongs to the family of oxidoreductases, specifically those acting on NADH or NADPH with a quinone or similar compound as acceptor. The systematic name of this enzyme class is 2-hydroxy-1,4-benzoquinone:NADH oxidoreductase. Other names in common use include hydroxybenzoquinone reductase, 1,2,4-trihydroxybenzene:NAD oxidoreductase, and NADH:2-hydroxy-1,4-benzoquinone oxidoreductase.
