= C6H4O4 =

The molecular formula C_{6}H_{4}O_{4} may refer to:

- Coumalic acid
- Dihydroxybenzoquinones
  - 2,3-Dihydroxy-1,4-benzoquinone
  - 2,5-Dihydroxy-1,4-benzoquinone
  - 2,6-Dihydroxy-1,4-benzoquinone
  - 3,4-Dihydroxy-1,2-benzoquinone
  - 3,5-Dihydroxy-1,2-benzoquinone
  - 3,6-Dihydroxy-1,2-benzoquinone
  - 4,5-Dihydroxy-1,2-benzoquinone
- 5-Carboxyfurfuraldehyde
- 2-Furylglyoxylic acid
- 3-Furylglyoxylic acid

== See also ==
- Hydroxybenzoquinone
