= Rubellin B =

Names
- IUPAC name (3R,3aS,10S,10aS,19cR)-3,6,10,13,15,18-hexahydroxy-8-methyl-3,3a,11,19c-tetrahydrobenzo[e]naphtho[2',3':5,6]fluoreno[1,9a-b]oxepine-5,14,19(10H)-trione

Properties
Chemical formula	C30H22O10
Molar mass	542.50 g⋅mol^-1
Melting point	1428.25 [K]
Boiling point	1709.77 [K]

Identifiers
CAS Number	102349-31-5
3D model (JSmol)	Interactive image
ChemSpider	52085317
PubChem CID	119025778
UNII	88B20HYO95
- InChI: InChI=1S/C30H22O10/c1-10-6-12-20(17(34)7-10)29(39)40-28-16(33)3-2-13-19-11(9-30(13,28)27(12)38)8-18(35)23-24(19)26(37)22-15(32)5-4-14(31)21(22)25(23)36/h2-8,13,16,27-28,31-35,38H,9H2,1H3/t13-,16-,27+,28-,30+/m1/s1 Key: KHJHNXVDMFGVEP-PJQIVZKYSA-N
- SMILES: CC1=CC2=C(C(=C1)O)C(=O)O[C@@H]3[C@@H](C=C[C@H]4[C@]3([C@H]2O)CC5=CC(=C6C(=C45)C(=O)C7=C(C=CC(=C7C6=O)O)O)O)O
- Except where otherwise noted, data are given for materials in their standard state (at 25 °C [77 °F], 100 kPa). Infobox references

Rubellin B is a phytotoxic chemical responsible for the Ramularia leaf spot disease due to its ability to create reactive radical superoxides. The drug has not been involved in many clinical studies, but has been found to prevent tau aggregation pointing to its potential in the treatment of Alzheimer's disease.

== Biosynthesis ==

The biosynthesis of rubellins involved a Type 1 PKS system to create an anthraquinone base, chrysophanol, which is then dimerized and post-processed to create a multitude of rubellin products. The process begins with a loaded Starter ACP which goes through 7 extension rounds with a KT (ketosynthase), AT (acetyltransferase), PT product template), and ACP (acyl carrier protein) complex using malonyl-CoA as a loading molecule. The complex is then cyclized by a β-lactamase enzyme and decarboxylated by the RccH producing the chrysophanol intermediate. The chrysophanol unit then goes through a de-aromatization with the enzyme RccC, a tetrahydronaphthalenes reductase, TH4N. These two chrysophanol units are then conjugated to one another by a P450 enzyme, RccM, which is unique in the Ramularia collo-cygni. This molecule serves as a precursor for the production of a multitude of rubellins, one being rubellin B. Continuing the pathway to rubellin B, the precursor molecule is hydroxylated by the enzyme RccD, an FAD-dependent monooxygenase. The final step to rubellin B is an oxidation to a seven-membered ring by the enzyme BVMO, RccL in the drawing.

== Biosynthesis of conformers ==
The biosynthesis of all rubellin compounds found in Ramularia collo-cygni has been reported in the literature.

== Natural occurrence ==
Rubellin occurs naturally in a number of fungi and a mix of the rubellins causes the phytotoxic effects named as the Ramularia leaf spot disease. Initially the molecule was discovered due to its presence on a cash crop and was thus isolated from the fungus Mycospharella rubella in 1986. The compound was more recently isolated in Germany due to its presence on diseased leaves from the fungus Ramularia collo-cygni which has paved the way for the classification of the molecule's synthesis and properties.
