= 4-Nitrocatechol 4-monooxygenase =

Class of enzymes

4-nitrocatechol 4-monooxygenase

Identifiers
- EC no.: 1.14.13.166

Databases
- IntEnz: IntEnz view
- BRENDA: BRENDA entry
- ExPASy: NiceZyme view
- KEGG: KEGG entry
- MetaCyc: metabolic pathway
- PRIAM: profile
- PDB structures: RCSB PDB PDBe PDBsum
Search
- PMC: articles
- PubMed: articles
- NCBI: proteins

4-nitrocatechol 4-monooxygenase (EC 1.14.13.166) is an enzyme with systematic name 4-nitrocatechol,NAD(P)H:oxygen 4-oxidoreductase (4-hydroxylating, nitrite-forming).This enzyme catalyses the following chemical reaction:

4-nitrocatechol
+ NADH + H^{+}
O_{2}
H_{2}O
hydroxy-1,4-benzoquinone
+ NAD^{+} + HNO_{2}

The four substrates of this enzyme are 4-nitrocatechol, reduced nicotinamide adenine dinucleotide (NADH), oxygen, and a proton. Its products are hydroxy-1,4-benzoquinone, oxidised NAD^{+}, water, and nitrous acid. It is a flavoprotein that uses flavin adenine dinucleotide as a cofactor.
