= Alizarin cyanine R =

Names
- IUPAC name 1,2,4,5,7,8-Hexahydroxyanthraquinone
- Other names: Alizarine Cyclamine R; 1,2,4,5,7,8-Hexahydroxy-9,10-anthracenedione

Identifiers
CAS Number	6373-25-7
3D model (JSmol)	Interactive image
ChemSpider	11516790
PubChem CID	22643669
UNII	S3OT592S9T
CompTox Dashboard (EPA)	20213150
- InChI: InChI=1S/C14H8O8/c15-3-1-5(17)11(19)9-7(3)13(21)8-4(16)2-6(18)12(20)10(8)14(9)22/h1-2,15-20H Key: NEVTZWLESVDYDA-UHFFFAOYSA-N
- SMILES: C1=C(C2=C(C(=C1O)O)C(=O)C3=C(C2=O)C(=CC(=C3O)O)O)O

Properties
Chemical formula	C_{14}H_{8}O_{8}
Molar mass	304.022 g·mol^{−1}
- Except where otherwise noted, data are given for materials in their standard state (at 25 °C [77 °F], 100 kPa). Infobox references

Alizarin cyanine R is an anthraquinone dye and belongs to the mordant dyes

== History ==
Alizarin cyanine R was discovered by R. E. Schmidt in 1891.

== Representation ==
Alizarin cyanine R can be obtained by oxidation of alizarin Bordeaux with manganese dioxide, analogous to the oxidation of alizarin to purpurin.

Another route involves Chinalizarin (C.I. 58500), which is treated with manganese dioxide in sulfuric acid, followed by oxidation of the resulting quinone and subsequent reduction (chemistry) with sulfurous acid.

A further possibility is the oxidation of anthrapurpurin (C.I. 58255) with Oleum.

== Use ==
This dye yields a violet aluminum lacquer and a blue chrome lacquer.

== Differentiation from C.I. Mordant Blue 32 ==
The Colour Index lists C.I. Mordant Blue 32 under the constitution number C.I. 58605 and describes it as 1,2,4,5,6,8-hexahydroxy-9,10-anthraquinone, which was discovered by R. Bohn in 1891.

	C.I. Mordant Blue 32
Name	1,2,4,5,6,8-Hexahydroxy-9,10-anthracenedione
Structural formula	Formula
CAS number	61169-36-6
PubChem	80762
ChemSpider	72916
Wikidata	Q27104411
Sum formula	C_{14}H_{8}O_{8}
Molar mass	304.022 g·mol^{−1}

SciFinder lists C.I. Mordant Blue 32 under the CAS number 6373-24-6, in which five hydroxy groups are located at the 1, 2, 4, 5, and 8 positions of the anthraquinone, while the sixth hydroxy group is variably assigned to either the 6 or 7 position.

According to the Colour Index, the respective technical products contain the alternate isomer as an impurity.
