= Rufigallol =

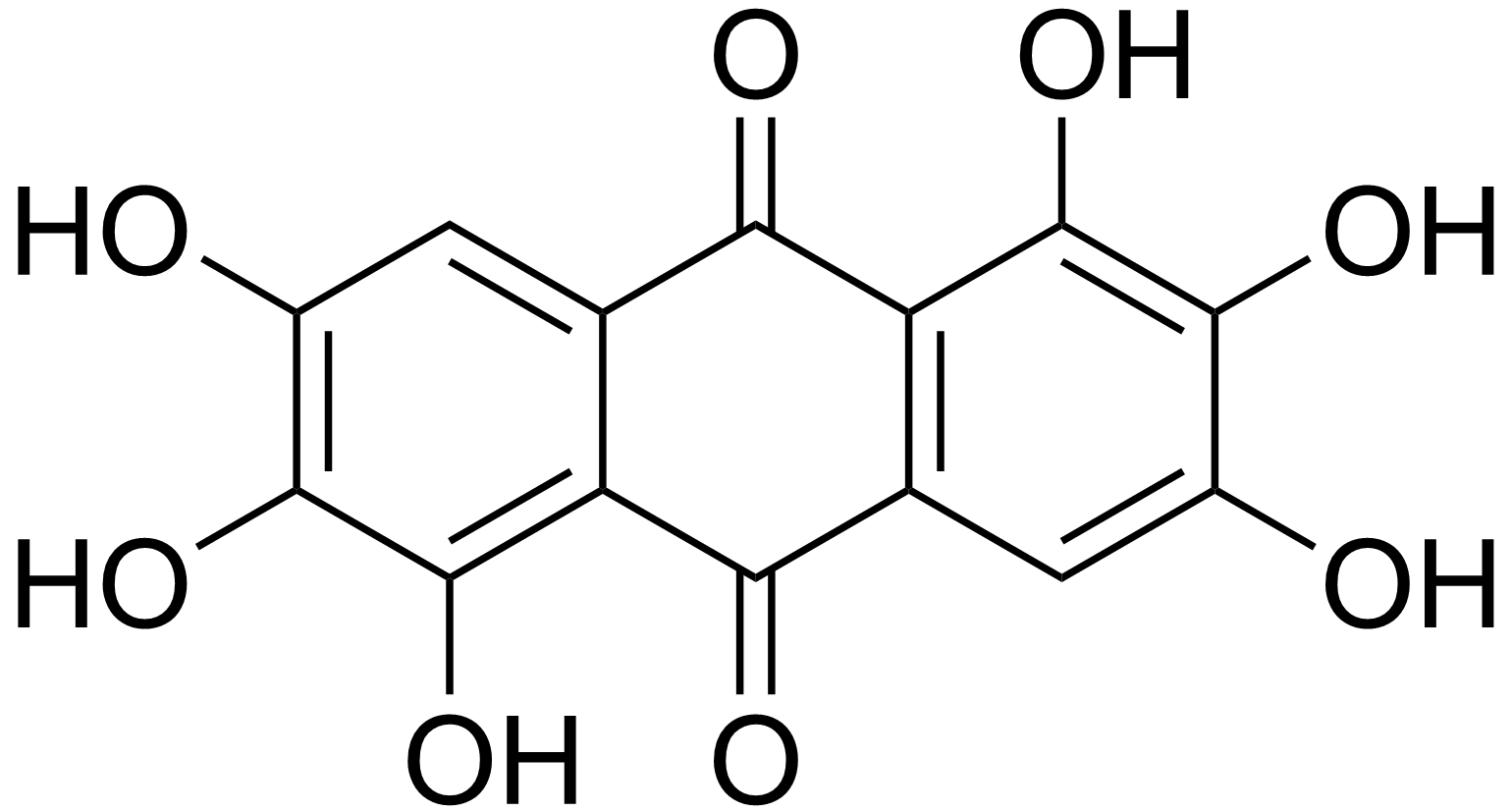
- Skeletal formula of rufigallol

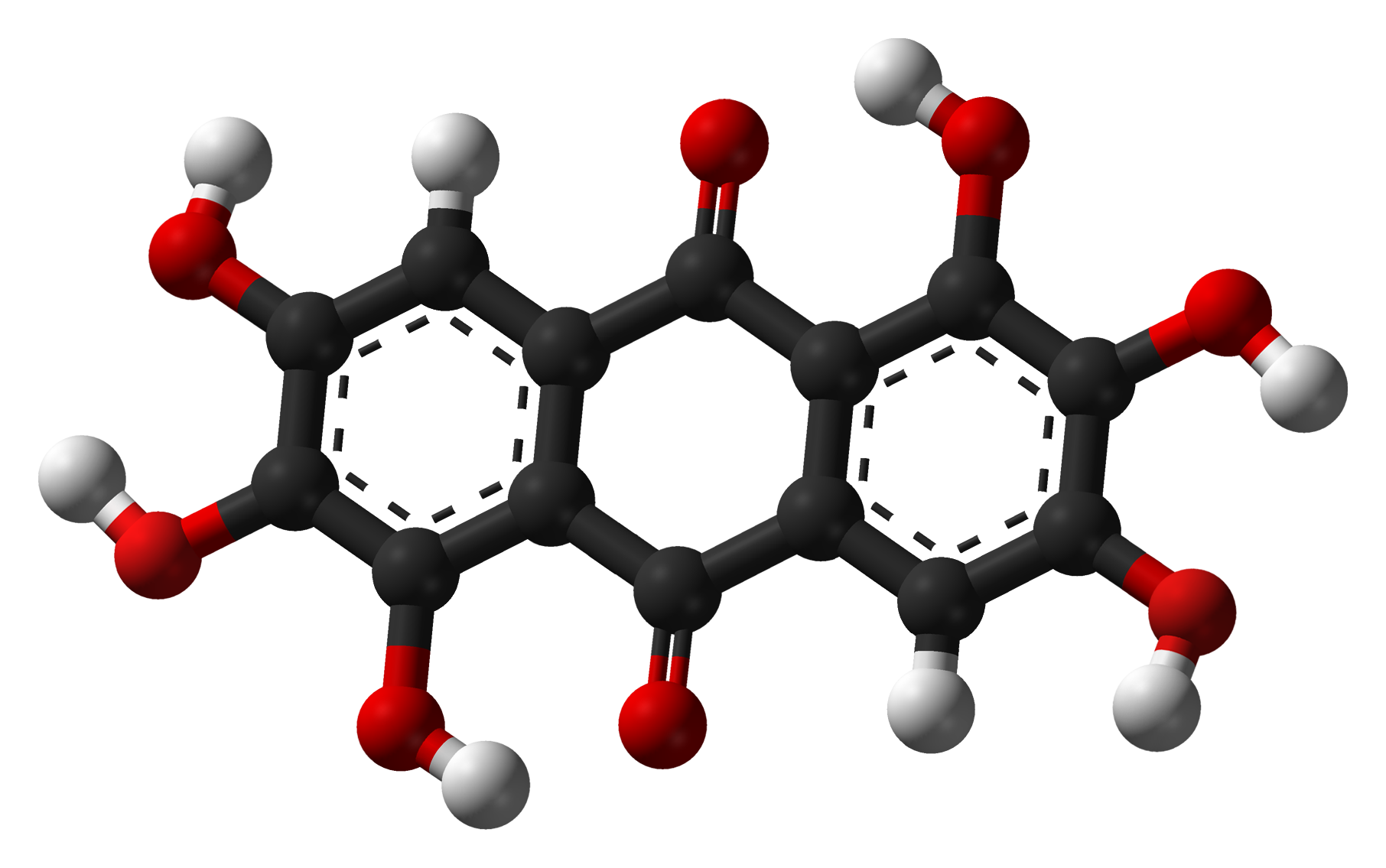
- Ball-and-stick model of rufigallol

Names
- Preferred IUPAC name 1,2,3,5,6,7-Hexahydroxyanthracene-9,10-dione
- Other names Rufigallic acid; 1,2,3,5,6,7-Hexahydroxy-9,10-anthraquinone; 1,2,3,5,6,7-Hexahydroxyanthracene-9,10-dione

Identifiers
CAS Number	82-12-2
3D model (JSmol)	Interactive image
ChEBI	CHEBI:37500
ChemSpider	59160
PubChem CID	65737
UNII	S977046N6I
CompTox Dashboard (EPA)	DTXSID1075359
- InChI: InChI=1S/C14H8O8/c15-5-1-3-7(13(21)11(5)19)10(18)4-2-6(16)12(20)14(22)8(4)9(3)17/h1-2,15-16,19-22H Key: NEIMTOOWBACOHT-UHFFFAOYSA-N; InChI=1/C14H8O8/c15-5-1-3-7(13(21)11(5)19)10(18)4-2-6(16)12(20)14(22)8(4)9(3)17/h1-2,15-16,19-22H Key: NEIMTOOWBACOHT-UHFFFAOYAS
- SMILES: C1=C2C(=C(C(=C1O)O)O)C(=O)C3=CC(=C(C(=C3C2=O)O)O)O

Properties
Chemical formula	C_{14}H_{8}O_{8}
Molar mass	304.210 g·mol^{−1}
- Except where otherwise noted, data are given for materials in their standard state (at 25 °C [77 °F], 100 kPa). verify (what is ?) Infobox references

Rufigallol or 1,2,3,5,6,7-hexahydroxy-9,10-anthraquinone is an organic compound with formula C_{14}O_{8}H_{8}. It one of several hydroxyanthraquinones. It occurs naturally being derived from gallic acid.

The compound is soluble in dioxane, from which it crystallizes as red needles that sublime without melting at 365 °C. It can be obtained by treating gallic acid with concentrated sulfuric acid and then with sodium hydroxide. It is prepared by acid-catalyzed condensation of a pair of gallic acid molecules.

Rufigallol is particularly toxic to the malarial parasite Plasmodium falciparum and has a synergistic effect in combination with the antimalarial drug exifone, which has structural similarities to rufigallol.

Rufigallol forms a crimson-colored complex with beryllium, aluminium, thorium, zirconium and hafnium, and this reaction has been used for the spot and spectrophotometric determination of beryllium in low concentrations.

== See also ==
- Quinone
- Hydroxyanthraquinone
- Hexahydroxyanthraquinone
- Octahydroxyanthraquinone
