= Ardisiaquinone =

Ardisiaquinones
Identifiers
CAS Number	A: 18799-05-8; B: 18761-04-1
3D model (JSmol)	A: Interactive image; B: Interactive image; D: Interactive image; E: Interactive image; F: Interactive image; G: Interactive image
ChemSpider	A: 4941125; B: 4944280; G: 552300
PubChem CID	A: 6436493; B: 10482057; D: 10347303; E: 10323081; F: 10097446; G: 636534
- InChI: A: InChI=1S/C30H40O8/c1-37-25-19-23(31)27(33)21(29(25)35)17-15-13-11-9-7-5-3-4-6-8-10-12-14-16-18-22-28(34)24(32)20-26(38-2)30(22)36/h3-4,19-20,33-34H,5-18H2,1-2H3/b4-3- Key: RSYDDJMZYDRCOF-ARJAWSKDSA-N; B: InChI=1S/C30H40O8/c1-20-25(32)29(36)22(30(37)26(20)33)18-16-14-12-10-8-6-4-3-5-7-9-11-13-15-17-21-27(34)23(31)19-24(38-2)28(21)35/h3-4,19,32,34,37H,5-18H2,1-2H3/b4-3- Key: KRSLVFPYJNSDEQ-ARJAWSKDSA-N; D: InChI=1S/C31H42O8/c1-21-26(33)29(36)23(30(37)31(21)39-3)19-17-15-13-11-9-7-5-4-6-8-10-12-14-16-18-22-27(34)24(32)20-25(38-2)28(22)35/h4-5,20,34,36H,6-19H2,1-3H3/b5-4- Key: CEYKFDJEGPDJSH-PLNGDYQASA-N; E: InChI=1S/C29H40O6/c1-35-27-21-26(32)28(33)25(29(27)34)17-15-13-11-9-7-5-3-2-4-6-8-10-12-14-16-22-18-23(30)20-24(31)19-22/h2-3,18-21,30-31,33H,4-17H2,1H3/b3-2- Key: UAVAYCHSCHCWEM-IHWYPQMZSA-N; F: InChI=1S/C30H42O6/c1-22-25(31)19-23(20-26(22)32)17-15-13-11-9-7-5-3-4-6-8-10-12-14-16-18-24-29(34)27(33)21-28(36-2)30(24)35/h3-4,19-21,31-32,34H,5-18H2,1-2H3/b4-3- Key: VHRGRLJMZWTPMP-ARJAWSKDSA-N; G: InChI=1S/C31H40O10/c1-18-24(34)28(38)23(31(26(18)36)41-21(4)33)17-15-13-11-9-7-5-6-8-10-12-14-16-22-27(37)25(35)19(2)30(29(22)39)40-20(3)32/h34,37H,5-17H2,1-4H3 Key: AVPDKIQZUGDDMG-UHFFFAOYSA-N
- SMILES: A: COC1=CC(=O)C(=C(C1=O)CCCCCCC/C=C\CCCCCCCC2=C(C(=O)C=C(C2=O)OC)O)O; B: CC1=C(C(=O)C(=C(C1=O)O)CCCCCCC/C=C\CCCCCCCC2=C(C(=O)C=C(C2=O)OC)O)O; D: CC1=C(C(=O)C(=C(C1=O)O)CCCCCCC/C=C\CCCCCCCC2=C(C(=O)C=C(C2=O)OC)O)OC; E: COC1=CC(=O)C(=C(C1=O)CCCCCCC/C=C\CCCCCCCC2=CC(=CC(=C2)O)O)O; F: CC1=C(C=C(C=C1O)CCCCCCC/C=C\CCCCCCCC2=C(C(=O)C=C(C2=O)OC)O)O; G: CC1=C(C(=O)C(=C(C1=O)OC(=O)C)CCCCCCCCCCCCCC2=C(C(=O)C(=C(C2=O)OC(=O)C)C)O)O
- Except where otherwise noted, data are given for materials in their standard state (at 25 °C [77 °F], 100 kPa). Infobox references

Ardisiaquinones are a group of closely related chemical compounds found in plants in the genus Ardisia. The first examples, ardisiaquinones A-C, were isolated in 1968 from Ardisia sieboldii. In 1995, ardisiaquinones D, E, and F were discovered, also from Ardisia sieboldii. In 2001, ardisiaquinones G, H and I were isolated from Ardisia teysmanniana.

Chemically, the ardisiaquinones consist of two variably-substituted 1,4-benzoquinone units connected by a long alkyl or alkenyl chain.

== Research ==
Ardisiaquinones are of research interest because they possess 5-lipoxygenase (5-LOX) inhibitor activity and 5-LOX has clinical relevance in inflammation. For example, ardisiaquinone A protects against liver injury in an animal model of ischemia-reperfusion injury. Likewise, ardisiaquinone G has also shown 5-LOX inhibition. Ardisiaquinone A has also been shown to have an antiallergic effect in an animal model. Other ardisiaquinones have shown antiproliferative and antimicrobial effects in vitro.

Laboratory syntheses of ardisiaquinones A and B have been reported.

== Chemical structures ==
Ardisiaquinone A

Ardisiaquinone B

Ardisiaquinone C

Ardisiaquinone D

Ardisiaquinone E

Ardisiaquinone F

Ardisiaquinone G
