= 1,5-Dihydroxyanthraquinone =

Names
- Preferred IUPAC name 1,5-Dihydroxyanthracene-9,10-dione
- Other names 1,5-dihydroxy-9,10-anthracenedione, 1,5-dihydroxyanthraquinone, Anthrarufin

Identifiers
CAS Number	117-12-4
3D model (JSmol)	Interactive image
Beilstein Reference	1881718
ChEBI	CHEBI:37501
ChEMBL	ChEMBL55761
ChemSpider	8025
ECHA InfoCard	100.003.796
EC Number	204-175-6
Gmelin Reference	144152
PubChem CID	8328
UNII	KPB60W5S3M
CompTox Dashboard (EPA)	DTXSID8051594
- InChI: InChI=1S/C14H8O4/c15-9-5-1-3-7-11(9)14(18)8-4-2-6-10(16)12(8)13(7)17/h1-6,15-16H Key: JPICKYUTICNNNJ-UHFFFAOYSA-N
- SMILES: C1=CC2=C(C(=C1)O)C(=O)C3=C(C2=O)C(=CC=C3)O

Properties
Chemical formula	C_{14}H_{8}O_{4}
Molar mass	240.214 g·mol^{−1}
Appearance	orange solid
Density	1.56 g/cm^{3}
Melting point	280 °C (536 °F; 553 K)

Hazards
- GHS labelling
Pictograms	(GHS07: Exclamation mark)
Signal word	Warning
Hazard statements	H315, H319, H335
Precautionary statements	P261, P264, P264+P265, P271, P280, P302+P352, P304+P340, P305+P351+P338, P319, P321, P332+P317, P337+P317, P362+P364, P403+P233, P405, P501
- Except where otherwise noted, data are given for materials in their standard state (at 25 °C [77 °F], 100 kPa). Infobox references

1,5-Dihydroxyanthraquinone is an organic compound with the formula (C_{6}H_{3}OH)_{2}(CO)_{2}. It is one of several isomers of dihydroxyanthraquinone. An orange solid, it is a component of traditional Chinese medications. It serves as a chelating ligand for transition metals.
