= Benzoquinone =

Benzoquinone (C_{6}H_{4}O_{2}) is a quinone with a single benzene ring. There are 2 (out of 3 hypothetical) benzoquinones:

- 1,4-Benzoquinone, the more common isomer, right image (also para-benzoquinone, p-benzoquinone, para-quinone, or just quinone)
- 1,2-Benzoquinone, the less-common isomer, left image (also ortho-benzoquinone, o-benzoquinone, ortho-quinone)

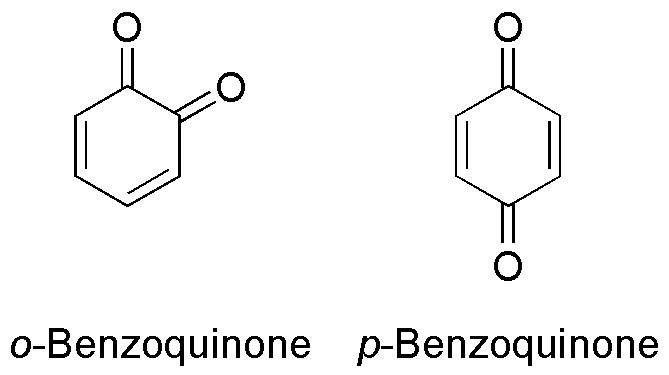

- 1,3-benzoquinone itself does not exist though derivatives are known and have various potential applications.

== See also ==
- Arene substitution pattern
