= 1,3-Dihydroxyanthraquinone =

- Skeletal formula

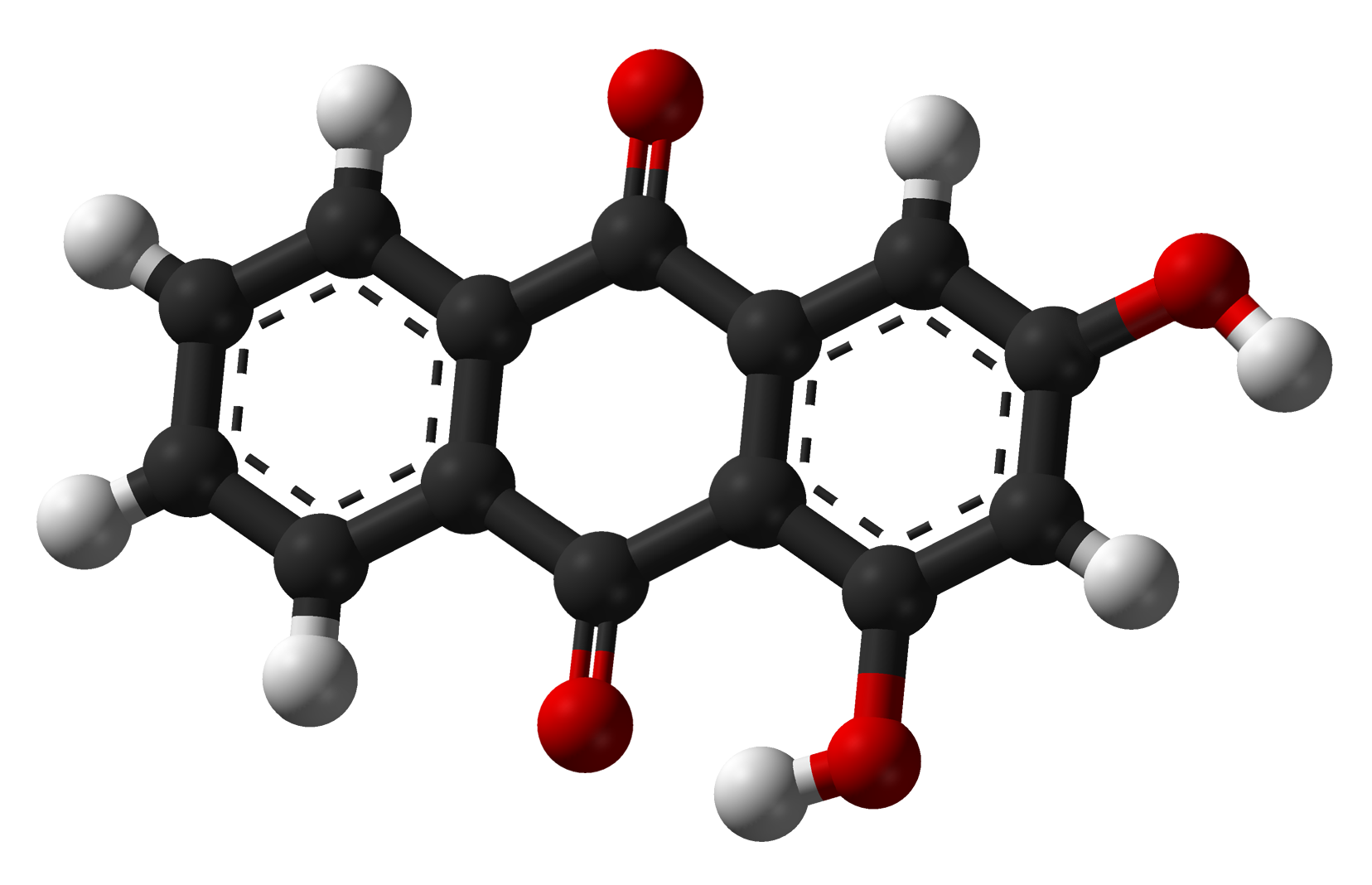
- Ball-and-stick model

Names
- Preferred IUPAC name 1,3-Dihydroxyanthracene-9,10-dione
- Other names Purpuroxanthin; Xanthopurpurin

Identifiers
CAS Number	518-83-2
3D model (JSmol)	Interactive image
ChEBI	CHEBI:37502
ChEMBL	ChEMBL372711
ChemSpider	170598
PubChem CID	196978
UNII	9RBB2G1GQB
CompTox Dashboard (EPA)	DTXSID6075431
- InChI: InChI=1S/C14H8O4/c15-7-5-10-12(11(16)6-7)14(18)9-4-2-1-3-8(9)13(10)17/h1-6,15-16H Key: WPWWKBNOXTZDQJ-UHFFFAOYSA-N; InChI=1/C14H8O4/c15-7-5-10-12(11(16)6-7)14(18)9-4-2-1-3-8(9)13(10)17/h1-6,15-16H Key: WPWWKBNOXTZDQJ-UHFFFAOYAR
- SMILES: O=C2c1ccccc1C(=O)c3c2cc(O)cc3O

Properties
Chemical formula	C_{14}H_{8}O_{4}
Molar mass	240.21 g/mol
- Except where otherwise noted, data are given for materials in their standard state (at 25 °C [77 °F], 100 kPa). verify (what is ?) Infobox references

1,3-Dihydroxyanthraquinone, also called purpuroxanthin or xanthopurpurin, is an organic compound with formula C_{14}H_{8}O_{4} that occurs in the plant Rubia cordifolia (Indian madder). It is one of ten dihydroxyanthraquinone isomers. Its molecular structure can be viewed as being derived from anthraquinone by replacement of two hydrogen atoms (H) by hydroxyl groups (-OH).

Xanthopurpurin occurs in small amounts (as a glycoside) in the root of the common madder plant, Rubia tinctorum, together with alizarin, purpurin and other anthraquinone derivatives.

== Properties ==
Xanthopurpurin is insoluble in hexane but soluble in chloroform. It can be obtained from solutions in the latter as reddish crystals that melt at 270–273 °C.

Like many dihydroxy- and trihydroxyanthraquinones, it has a purgative action, although only 1/6 as effective as 1,2,7-trihidroxyanthraquinone (anthrapurpurin).

== See also ==
- alizarin (1,2-dihydroxyanthraquinone)
