= Malbranchea cinnamomea =

Scientific classification
- Kingdom: Fungi
- Division: Ascomycota
- Class: Eurotiomycetes
- Order: Onygenales
- Family: Malbrancheaceae
- Genus: Malbranchea
- Species: M. cinnamomea

Binomial name
- Malbranchea cinnamomea Oorschot & de Hoog (1984)

Synonyms
- Trichothecium cinnamomeum Lib. (1857); Geotrichum cinnamomeum (Lib.) Sacc. (1881); Thermoidium sulphureum Miehe (1907); Thermoidium sulfureum Miehe (1907); Malbranchea pulchella var. sulfurea (Miehe) Cooney & R.Emers. (1964); Malbranchea sulfurea (Miehe) Sigler & J.W.Carmich. (1976); Malbranchea sulfurea (Miehe) Pidopl. (1953)

Species of fungus

Malbranchea cinnamomea is a thermophilic fungus belonging to the order Onygenales. This ascomycete fungi is often isolated from higher-temperature environments. It is naturally found in composting soil and can degrade plant biomass.

M. cinnamonea has biochemical relevance, as it produces a quinone antibiotic (6-(1-acetylethyl)-2-methoxy-2,5-cyclohexadiene-1,4-dione) named malbranicin, as well as thermostable enzymes, such as alpha-glucosidases, xylanases, alpha-amylases, and glucanases.

The genome of M. cinnamomea was published in 2017 by Zoraide Granchi and coworkers from the OPTIBIOCAT project. The genome contains 24.96 million bases. The OPTIBIOCAT consortium estimates that there are 9,437 protein-coding genes. The sequencing was performed in Leiden, The Netherlands
