= C6H4O6 =

The molecular formula C_{6}H_{4}O_{6} (molar mass: 172.09 g/mol, exact mass: 172.0008 u) may refer to:

- Tetrahydroxy-1,4-benzoquinone
- Tetrahydroxy-1,2-benzoquinone
