= Lunatin =

Names
- Preferred IUPAC name 1,3,8-Trihydroxy-6-methoxyanthracene-9,10-dione
- Other names 3-Methoxy-1,6,8-trihydroxyanthraquinone

Identifiers
3D model (JSmol)	Interactive image
ChEMBL	ChEMBL459700
ChemSpider	552452
PubChem CID	636723
CompTox Dashboard (EPA)	DTXSID501336405
- InChI: InChI=1S/C15H10O6/c1-21-7-4-9-13(11(18)5-7)15(20)12-8(14(9)19)2-6(16)3-10(12)17/h2-5,16-18H,1H3 Key: DGZZHABEBFUFSC-UHFFFAOYSA-N
- SMILES: COC1=CC(=C2C(=C1)C(=O)C3=CC(=CC(=C3C2=O)O)O)O

Properties
Chemical formula	C_{15}H_{10}O_{6}
Molar mass	286.239 g·mol^{−1}
- Except where otherwise noted, data are given for materials in their standard state (at 25 °C [77 °F], 100 kPa). Infobox references

Lunatin (3-methoxy-1,6,8-trihydroxyanthraquinone) is a derivative of anthraquinone. It is produced by the Senna reticulata tree and can be extracted by soaking the bark in alcohol. Lunatin is also produced by the fungus Curvularia lunata which inhabits a marine sponge. Lunatin is an antibacterial substance.
