= Hydroxynaphthoquinone =

A hydroxynaphthoquinone (formula: C_{10}H_{6}O_{3}) is any of several organic compounds that can be viewed as derivatives of a naphthoquinone through replacement of one hydrogen atom (H) by a hydroxyl group (-OH).

In general, the term may mean any naphthoquinone derivative where any number n of hydrogens have been replaced by n hydroxyls, so that the formula is C_{10}H_{6}O_{2+n}. In this case the number n (which is between 1 and 6) is indicated by a multiplier prefix (mono-, di-, tri-, tetra-, penta-, or hexa-).

The unqualified term "hydroxynaphthoquinone" usually means a derivative of 1,4-naphthoquinone. Other hydroxy- compounds can be derived from other isomers of the latter, such as 1,2-naphthoquinone and 2,6-naphthoquinone. The IUPAC nomenclature uses dihydronaphthalenedione instead of "naphthoquinone", with the necessary prefixes to indicate the positions of the carbonyl oxygens (=O) — as in 5,8-dihydroxy-1a,8a-dihydronaphthalene-1,4-dione (= 5,8-dihydroxy-1,4-naphthoquinone).

The hydroxynaphtoquinones (in the particular or the general sense) include many biologically and industrially important compounds, and are a building-block of many medicinal drugs.

== (Mono)hydroxynaphtoquinones ==
=== From 1,4-naphthoquinone ===
Due to its symmetry there are only three isomers:

- 2-Hydroxy-1,4-naphthoquinone (lawsone), coloring principle of henna.
- 5-Hydroxy-1,4-naphthoquinone (juglone), coloring principle of black walnut. Also active antimicrobial principle in Caesalpinia sappan heartwood.
- 6-Hydroxy-1,4-naphthoquinone, can be prepared from 1,7-dihydroxynaphthalene. One of the main products of photochemical oxidation of 1-naphthol.

=== From 1,2-naphthoquinone ===
From 1,2-naphthoquinone (ortho-naphthoquinone) there are 6 possible isomers:

- 3-Hydroxy-1,2-naphthoquinone
- 4-Hydroxy-1,2-naphthoquinone
- 5-Hydroxy-1,2-naphthoquinone
- 6-Hydroxy-1,2-naphthoquinone
- 7-Hydroxy-1,2-naphthoquinone
- 8-Hydroxy-1,2-naphthoquinone

=== From 2,3-naphthoquinone ===
From 2,3-naphthoquinone, also a symmetric molecule there are only three isomers:

- 1-Hydroxy-2,3-naphthoquinone
- 5-Hydroxy-1,2-naphthoquinone
- 6-Hydroxy-1,2-naphthoquinone

=== From 2,6-naphthoquinone ===
From the symmetrical 2,6-naphthoquinone (amphi-naphthoquinone) there are only three:

- 1-Hydroxy-2,6-naphthoquinone
- 3-Hydroxy-2,6-naphthoquinone
- 4-Hydroxy-2,6-naphthoquinone

== (Poly)hydroxynaphthoquinones ==
- Dihydroxynaphthoquinone
- Trihydroxynaphthoquinone
- Tetrahydroxynaphthoquinone
- Pentahydroxynaphthoquinone
- Hexahydroxynaphthoquinone

== See also ==
- Hydroxybenzoquinone
- Hydroxyanthraquinone
