= Georg von Georgievics =

Georg Cornelius Theodor von Georgievics (18 August 1859 – 26 April 1933) was an Austrian chemist.

== Biography ==
Georgievics was born on 18 August 1859 in Weißkirchen, Banat, Austrian Empire (now Bela Crkva, Serbia). He studied at the Technical University Vienna and worked for a year in the textile company Marienthal.

He continued his study with Zdenko Hans Skraup in Vienna and later with Carl Graebe at the University of Genf. From 1886, on he was assistant of Hugo Weidel at the institute for pedology (soil chemistry) in Vienna. He received his Ph.D. from the University of Gießen in 1890 and worked as lecturer at the Staatsgewerbeschulen Bielitz. He became professor at the German Charles-Ferdinand University in Prague in 1904. His area of research was based on dyes and dyeing processes.

He died on 26 April 1933 in Znojmo, Czechoslovakia.

== Works ==
- Monographie des Indigos, 1892
- Ausführliches Lehrbuch der Farbenchemie, 5. edition 1922
- Lehrbuch der chemischen Technologie der Gespinstfasern, 1917
- Farbe und Konstitution der Farbstoffe, 1920
- Handbuch des Zeugdruckes, together with R. Haller und L. Lichtenstein, 1929
