= Octahydroxyanthraquinone =

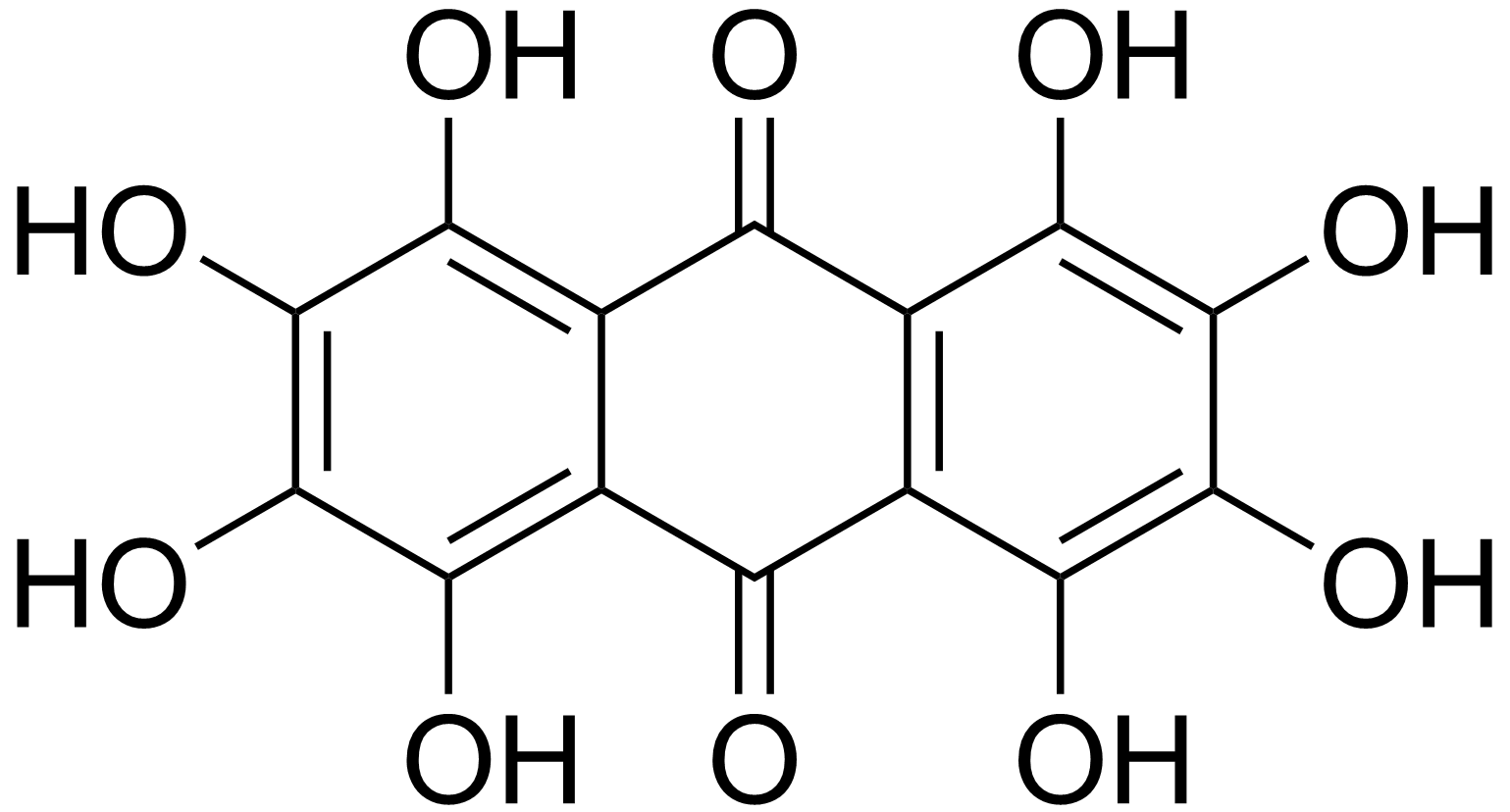
Skeletal formula of octahydroxyanthraquinone
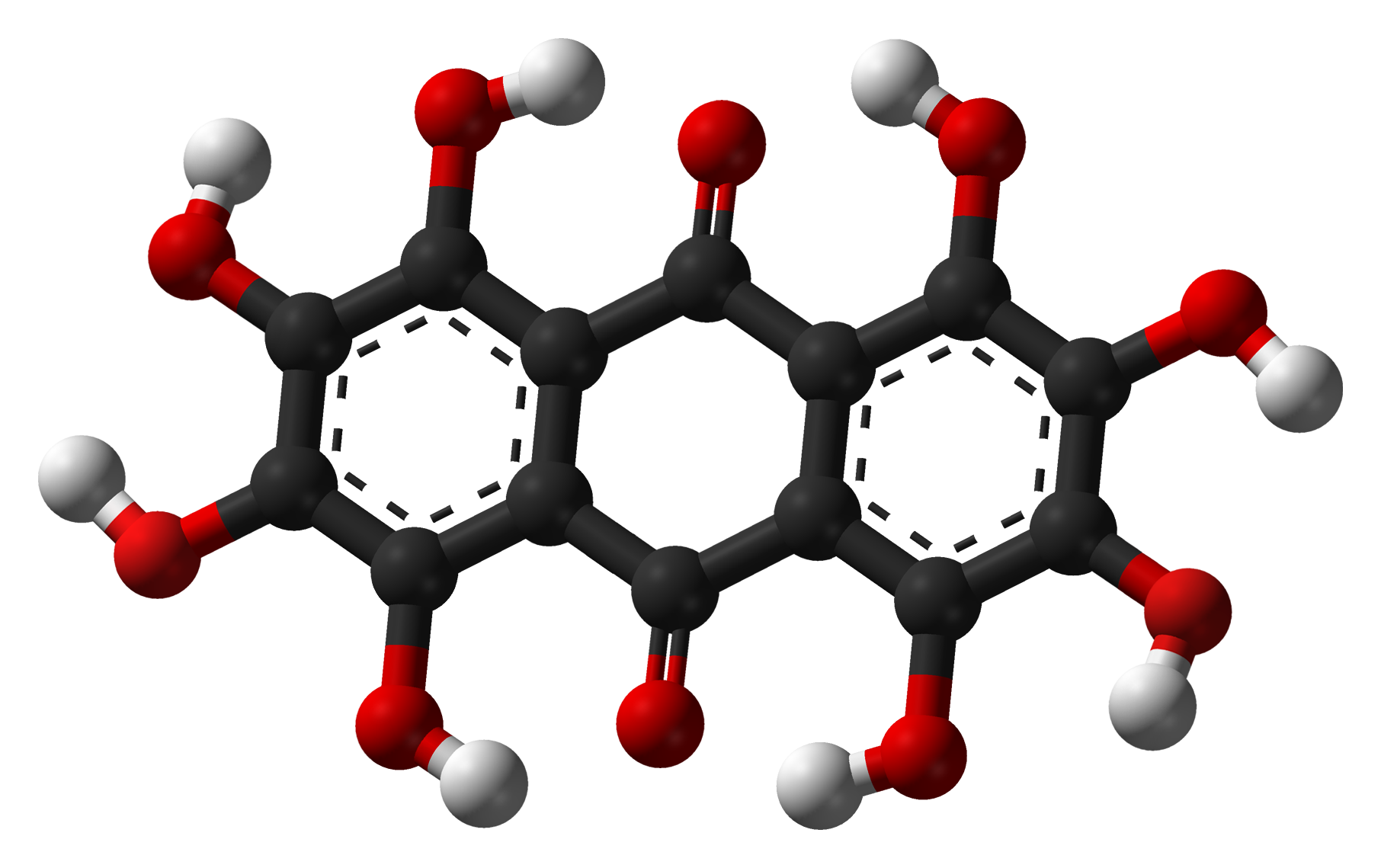
Ball and stick model of octahydroxyanthraquinone

Names
- Preferred IUPAC name 1,2,3,4,5,6,7,8-Octahydroxyanthracene-9,10-dione
- Other names Octahydroxyanthracenedione

Identifiers
CAS Number	169132-62-1
3D model (JSmol)	Interactive image; Interactive image
ChEBI	CHEBI:190016
ChEMBL	ChEMBL293801
ChemSpider	8016420
PubChem CID	9840703
UNII	62VN682KQG
CompTox Dashboard (EPA)	DTXSID40431697
- InChI: InChI=1S/C14H8O10/c15-5-1-2(8(18)12(22)11(21)7(1)17)6(16)4-3(5)9(19)13(23)14(24)10(4)20/h17-24H Key: KOWBNNJAGJIIJW-UHFFFAOYSA-N
- SMILES: OC1=C(O)C(O)=C2C(=O)C3=C(O)C(O)=C(O)C(O)=C3C(=O)C2=C1O; OC1=C(O)C(O)=C(O)C2=C1C(C3=C(O)C(O)=C(O)C(O)=C3C2=O)=O

Properties
Chemical formula	C_{14}H_{8}O_{10}
Molar mass	336.208 g·mol^{−1}
log P	−0.291
Acidity (pK_{a})	5.358
- Except where otherwise noted, data are given for materials in their standard state (at 25 °C [77 °F], 100 kPa). verify (what is ?) Infobox references

Octahydroxyanthraquinone is an organic compound with formula C_{14}H_{8}O_{10}, formally derived from anthraquinone by replacement of 8 hydrogen atoms by hydroxyl groups.

The compound was obtained in 1911 by Georg von Georgievics and can be obtained through oxidation of rufigallol (1,2,3,5,6,7-hexahydroxyanthraquinone) with boric acid and mercuric oxide in sulfuric acid at 250 °C (482 °F).

Esters of octahydroxyanthraquinone, where all eight hydroxyls are replaced by straight-chain 1-alkanecarboxylate groups H_{3}C-(CH_{2})_{n}-COO-, with n between 6 and 14, are liquid crystals and have been studied for possible LCD applications.

Octahydroxyanthraquinone is active against the malaria parasite, but rufigallol (1,2,3,5,6,7-hexahydroxyanthraquinone) is 22 times more potent.
