= Hexahydroxynaphthoquinone =

Hexahydroxynaphthoquinone can be any of several organic compounds, including:

- Hexahydroxy-1,4-naphthalenedione (spinochrome E)
- Hexahydroxy-1,2-naphthalenedione
- Hexahydroxy-2,3-naphthalenedione
- Hexahydroxy-2,6-naphthalenedione
