= Anthrapurpurin =

- Skeletal formula

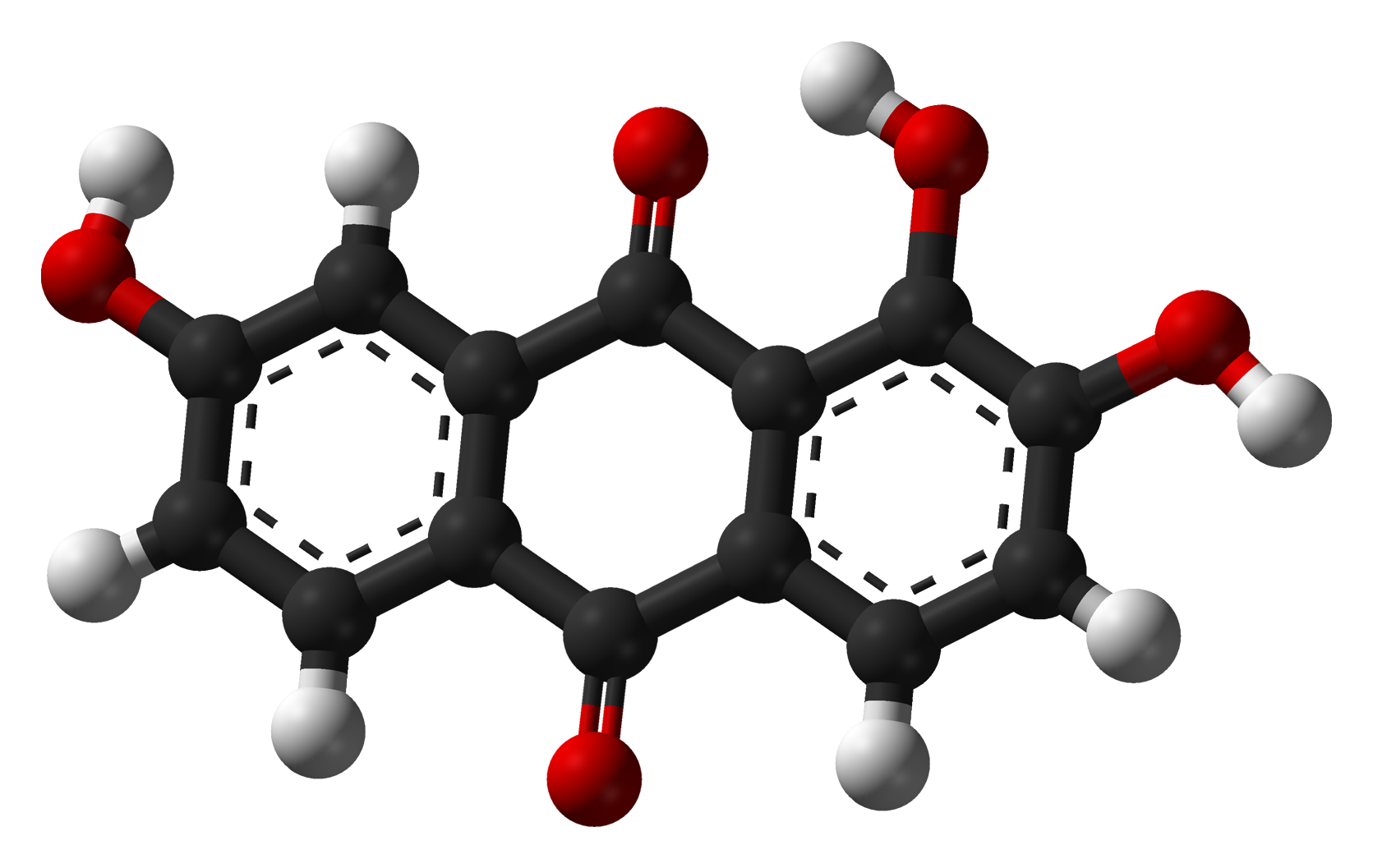
- Ball-and-stick model

Names
- Preferred IUPAC name 1,2,7-Trihydroxyanthracene-9,10-dione
- Other names 1,2,7-Trihydroxyanthraquinone

Identifiers
CAS Number	602-65-3
3D model (JSmol)	Interactive image
ChemSpider	1280
ECHA InfoCard	100.210.262
PubChem CID	1320
UNII	3DZB1V3N5H
CompTox Dashboard (EPA)	DTXSID40208947
- InChI: InChI=1S/C14H8O5/c15-6-1-2-7-9(5-6)13(18)11-8(12(7)17)3-4-10(16)14(11)19/h1-5,15-16,19H Key: WNHUAWNEKMITEW-UHFFFAOYSA-N
- SMILES: C1=CC2=C(C=C1O)C(=O)C3=C(C2=O)C=CC(=C3O)O

Properties
Chemical formula	C_{14}H_{8}O_{5}
Molar mass	256.213 g·mol^{−1}
- Except where otherwise noted, data are given for materials in their standard state (at 25 °C [77 °F], 100 kPa). verify (what is ?) Infobox references

Anthrapurpurin, or 1,2,7-trihydroxyanthraquinone, is a purple dye used in histology for the detection of calcium.

== See also ==
- Alizarin
- Purpurin
- Trihydroxyanthraquinone
- Hydroxyanthraquinone
- Anthraquinone
