= Trihydroxyanthraquinone =

A trihydroxyanthraquinone or trihydroxyanthracenedione is any of several isomeric organic compounds with formula (C_{12}H_{5}(OH)_{3})(CO)_{2}, formally derived from anthraquinone by replacing three hydrogen atoms by hydroxyl groups. They include several historically important dyes. The isomers may differ in the parent anthraquinone isomer and/or of the three hydroxyl groups.

In general there are 56 ways of choosing three out of the 8 hydrogens. However, if the underlying core is symmetrical, some of these choices will give identical molecules.

== Isomers ==
=== From 9,10-anthraquinone ===
Due to the symmetry of the 9,10-anthraquinone core, there are only 14 isomers.

- 1,2,3-Trihydroxyanthraquinone (anthragallol)
- 1,2,4-Trihydroxyanthraquinone (purpurin), a component of madder root dye.
- 1,2,5-Trihydroxyanthraquinone (oxyanthrarufin)
- 1,2,6-Trihydroxyanthraquinone (flavopurpurin)
- 1,2,7-Trihydroxyanthraquinone (isopurpurin, anthrapurpurin)
- 1,2,8-Trihydroxyanthraquinone (oxychrysazin)
- 1,3,5-Trihydroxyanthraquinone
- 1,3,6-Trihydroxyanthraquinone
- 1,3,7-Trihydroxyanthraquinone
- 1,3,8-Trihydroxyanthraquinone
- 1,4,5-Trihydroxyanthraquinone
- 1,4,6-Trihydroxyanthraquinone
- 1,6,7-Trihydroxyanthraquinone
- 2,3,6-Trihydroxyanthraquinone

== See also ==
- Hydroxyanthraquinone
- Dihydroxyanthraquinone
- Tetrahydroxyanthraquinone
- Pentahydroxyanthraquinone
- Hexahydroxyanthraquinone
- Heptahydroxyanthraquinone
- Octahydroxyanthraquinone
