= Chrysophanol =

Names
- Preferred IUPAC name 1,8-Dihydroxy-3-methylanthracene-9,10-dione

Identifiers
CAS Number	481-74-3
3D model (JSmol)	Interactive image
ChEBI	CHEBI:3687
ChemSpider	9793
ECHA InfoCard	100.006.885
KEGG	C10315
PubChem CID	10208
UNII	N1ST8V8RR2
CompTox Dashboard (EPA)	DTXSID6024832
- InChI: InChI=1S/C15H10O4/c1-7-5-9-13(11(17)6-7)15(19)12-8(14(9)18)3-2-4-10(12)16/h2-6,16-17H,1H3 Key: LQGUBLBATBMXHT-UHFFFAOYSA-N; InChI=1/C15H10O4/c1-7-5-9-13(11(17)6-7)15(19)12-8(14(9)18)3-2-4-10(12)16/h2-6,16-17H,1H3 Key: LQGUBLBATBMXHT-UHFFFAOYAW
- SMILES: CC1=CC2=C(C(=C1)O)C(=O)C3=C(C2=O)C=CC=C3O

Properties
Chemical formula	C_{15}H_{10}O_{4}
Molar mass	254.241 g·mol^{−1}
- Except where otherwise noted, data are given for materials in their standard state (at 25 °C [77 °F], 100 kPa). Infobox references

Chrysophanol, also known as chrysophanic acid, is a fungal isolate and a natural anthraquinone. It is a C-3 methyl substituted chrysazin of the trihydroxyanthraquinone family.

Chrysophanol (other names; 1,8-dihydroxy-3-methyl-anthraquinone and chrysophanic acid) was found commonly within Chinese medicine and is a naturally occurring anthraquinone. Studies have been conducted on the benefits of chrysophanol and have found that it can aid in preventing cancer, diabetes, asthma, osteoporosis, retinal degeneration, Alzheimer's disease, osteoarthritis, and atherosclerosis.

Its most common effects are of chemotherapeutic and neuroprotective properties.

== History ==
Chrysophanol was first noted from Rheum rhabarbarum which is a plant belonging to the Polygonaceae family. It has since been discovered to be present in various families such as Liliaceae, Meliaceae, Asphodelaceae and Fabaceae, among others. As of 2019, it has been observed in 65 species from 14 genera, not just in plants but animals and microbes as well.

== Uses ==
Chrysophanol has been shown to exhibit a variety of effects. It was shown in 2015 to lower cholesterol and triglyceride levels in zebrafish, as well as increase the frequency of peristalsis. This could therefore be used for lipid metabolic disorders in a clinical setting. Chrysophanol has also been shown to exhibit the same properties lipid lowering in rats in 2013.

It also has the potential to stimulate osteoblast differentiation. as well as alleviate diabetic nephropathy. Furthermore, it can protect bronchial cells from cigarette smoke extract induced apoptosis. Chrysophanol can also improve the condition of renal interstitial fibrosis.

Chrysophanol has also been used to inhibit T-Cell activation and protect mice from dextran sulphate sodium induced inflammatory bowel disease. It was shown to have attenuated the pro-inflammatory cytokines that were present in the colon tissue due to sulphate sodium induced inflammatory bowel disease.

== Mechanism of action ==
Chrysophanol can alleviate diabetic nephropathy by inactivating TGF-β/EMT signalling. It also has the potential to protect bronchial cells from cigarette smoke extract by repressing CYP1A expression which is usually produced due to excessive reactive oxygen species. Chrysophanol can increase osteoblast differentiation by inducing AMP-activated protein kinase as well as Smad1/5/9. Chrysophanol acts to improve renal interstitial fibrosis by downregulating TGF-β1 and phospho-Smad3 and by upregulating Smad7.

Chrysophanol can also aid in treatment for inflammatory bowel disease by inhibiting inflammation by targeting pro-inflammatory cytokines that are in tumour necrosis factor α. It has also been shown that it inhibits the mitogen-activated protein kinase pathway.

Chrysophanol blocks the proliferation of colon cancer cells in vitro. It induces the necrosis of cells via a reduction in ATP levels. Chrysophanol attenuates the effects of lead exposure in mice by reducing hippocampal neuronal cytoplasmic edema, enhancing mitochondrial crista fusion, significantly increasing memory and learning abilities, reducing lead content in blood, heart, brain, spleen, kidney and liver, promoting superoxide dismutase and glutathione peroxidase activities and reducing malondialdehyde level in the brain, kidney and liver.

== Potential therapeutic uses ==
Chrysophanol can act as an antineoplastic drug. This has been shown in multiple organisms. It has been reported that chrysophanol causes necrosis-like cell death in renal cancer cells. It also has expressed the capability to be classes as an ATC code A10 drug due to its effect on diabetic nephropathy as well as being able to lower lipid absorption.

== Production ==
Chrysophanol is naturally made by a variety of plant species. The most intake is from consumption of rhubarb.

== Drug interactions ==
Chrysophanol has been shown to be able to be co-administered with atorvastatin, to lower cholesterol levels. This is due to the different mechanisms for each, with chrysophanol thought to bind to the stomach to disturb lipid absorption, while atorvastatin decreases cholesterol production in the liver.

== Toxicity ==
Anthraquinones, chrysophanol derivatives among them, have been shown to be hepatotoxic. They can cause apoptosis in normal human liver cells. Chrysophanol derivatives such as chrysophanol-8-o-glucoside, have also been shown to possess anti-coagulant and anti-platelet properties. The derivatives also have potential to cause abnormal oxidative phosphorylation which can result in decreased mitochondrial membrane potential, as well as an increase in abundance of reactive oxygen species, and ultimately will lead to mitochondrial damage and eventual apoptosis.

There is also evidence that chrysophanol could cause damage to DNA. This has been demonstrated in two strains of Salmonella (strains TA 2637 and 1537). It is also important to note, that in treating liver cancer cells, it does so in a way that induced necrosis-like cell death. Necrosis damages the cellular environment, meaning that while it may treat potential issues, it can also damage the surrounding tissue.
