= Hydroxy-1,4-benzoquinone =

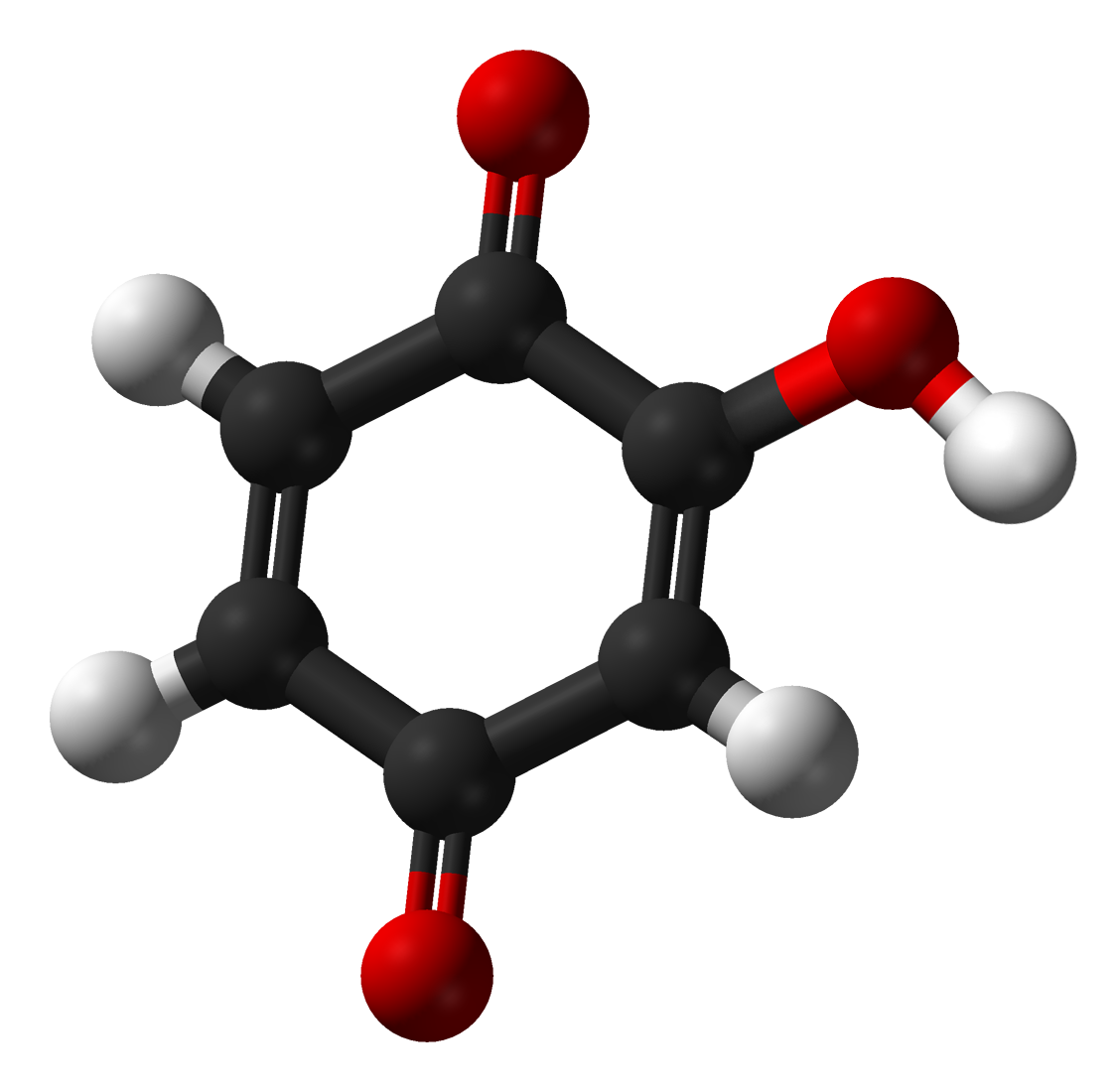

Names
- Preferred IUPAC name 2-Hydroxycyclohexa-2,5-diene-1,4-dione
- Other names 2-Hydroxy-p-benzoquinone

Identifiers
CAS Number	2474-72-8
3D model (JSmol)	Interactive image
ChEBI	CHEBI:18400
ChemSpider	133103
PubChem CID	151011
UNII	C7I5HV2JFI
CompTox Dashboard (EPA)	DTXSID60179468
- InChI: InChI=1S/C6H4O3/c7-4-1-2-5(8)6(9)3-4/h1-3,9H Key: GPLIMIJPIZGPIF-UHFFFAOYSA-N; InChI=1/C6H4O3/c7-4-1-2-5(8)6(9)3-4/h1-3,9H Key: GPLIMIJPIZGPIF-UHFFFAOYAA
- SMILES: C1=CC(=O)C(=CC1=O)O

Properties
Chemical formula	C_{6}H_{4}O_{3}
Molar mass	124.1 g/mol
- Except where otherwise noted, data are given for materials in their standard state (at 25 °C [77 °F], 100 kPa). verify (what is ?) Infobox references

Hydroxy-1,4-benzoquinone, also called hydroxy-para-benzoquinone, is an organic compound with formula C_{6}H_{4}O_{3}, formally derived from 1,4-Benzoquinone by replacing one hydrogen atom with a hydroxyl (OH) group. It is one of three hydroxybenzoquinone isomers and one of the simplest hydroxyquinones.

The compound is often called 2-hydroxy-1,4-benzoquinone, but the "2-" prefix is superfluous since there is no other hydroxy derivative of 1,4-benzoquinone. The IUPAC name is 2-hydroxycyclohexa-2,5-diene-1,4-dione.

It is formed by the reaction of 1,4-benzoquinone with hydrogen peroxide and is a byproduct of the metabolism of phenols, such as 1,2,4-benzenetriol. The enzyme 1,2,4-benzenetriol dehydrogenase catalyzes the conversion of 1,2,4-benzenetriol to 2-hydroxy-1,4-benzoquinone, and the enzyme hydroxybenzoquinone reductase catalyzes the reverse reaction. The enzyme 2-hydroxy-1,4-benzoquinone-2-reductase converts it to 1,4-benzoquinone.

It tends to dimerize spontaneously by peroxo bridges.

== See also ==
- Tetrahydroxy-1,4-benzoquinone
