= Quinone =

Class of organic compounds

The quinones are a class of organic compounds that are formally "derived from aromatic compounds [such as benzene or naphthalene] by conversion of an even number of –CH= groups into –C(=O)– groups with any necessary rearrangement of double bonds", resulting in "a fully conjugated cyclic dione structure". The archetypical member of the class is 1,4-benzoquinone or cyclohexadienedione, often called simply "quinone" (thus the name of the class). Other important examples are 1,2-benzoquinone (ortho-quinone), 1,4-naphthoquinone and 9,10-anthraquinone.

The name is derived from that of quinic acid (with the suffix "-one" indicating a ketone), since it is one of the compounds obtained upon oxidation of quinic acid. Quinic acid, like quinine is obtained from cinchona bark, called quinaquina in the indigenous languages of Peruvian tribes.

Quinones are commonly seen in chromophores. They are partly responsible for the yellowing of paper; the oxidation of lignin produces ketone derivatives and quinone derivatives, both of which are chromophores.

== Properties ==
Quinones are oxidized derivatives of aromatic compounds and are often readily made from reactive aromatic compounds with electron-donating substituents such as phenols and catechols, which increase the nucleophilicity of the ring and contributes to the large redox potential needed to break aromaticity. (Quinones are conjugated but not aromatic). Quinones are electrophilic Michael acceptors stabilised by conjugation. Depending on the quinone and the site of reduction, reduction can either rearomatise the compound or break the conjugation. Conjugate addition nearly always breaks the conjugation.

1,2-Benzoquinone

1,4-Benzoquinone

1,4-Naphthoquinone

9,10-Anthraquinone

The term quinone is also used more generally for a large class of compounds formally derived from aromatic quinones through replacement of some hydrogen atoms by other atoms or radicals.

Chloranil, a reagent in organic chemistry

Lawsone, a dye present in the leaves of the henna plant

Alizarin, a common red dye

DDQ, a reagent in organic chemistry

Daunorubicin, an anticancer drug

== Reactions ==
Quinones form polymers by formation of hydrogen bonds with ρ-hydroquinone.

=== Reduction ===
Quinones are oxidizing agents, sometimes reversibly so. Relative to benzoquinone, more strongly oxidizing quinones include chloranil and 2,3-dichloro-5,6-dicyano-1,4-benzoquinone (also known as DDQ).

The oxidizing power of quinones is enhanced by the presence of acids. In acidic conditions, quinone undergoes two-electron and two-proton reduction to hydroquinone.

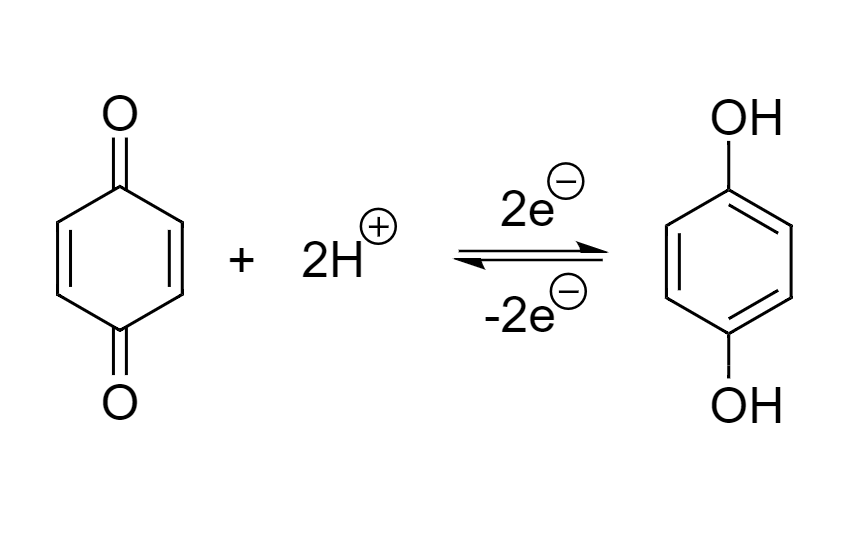
Reduction of quinone in an acidic, buffered media into hydroquinone

In alkaline conditions, quinones undergo a reversible single-step, two-electron reduction. In neutral conditions, quinones may undergo either a one-proton, two-electron reduction or a two-electron reduction. In aprotic media, quinones undergo two-step reduction without protons. In the first step, a short-lived semiquinone intermediate is formed. In the second step, the semiquinone is reduced into a quinone dianion.

9,10-Anthraquinone-2,7-disulphonic acid (AQDS), a quinone similar to one found naturally in rhubarb, has been used as a charge carrier in metal-free flow batteries.

=== Addition ===
Quinones undergo addition reaction to form 1,4-addition products. An example of 1,4-addition reaction is the addition of hydrogen chloride to form chlorohydroquinone:

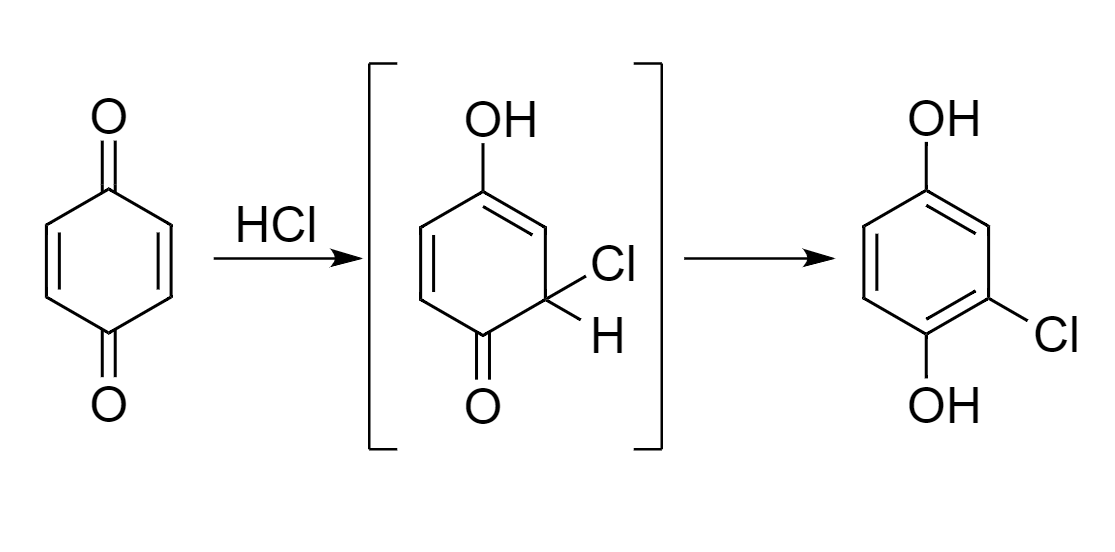
1,4-addition reaction of quinone with hydrogen chloride to produce chlorohydroquinone

Quinones can undergo Diels–Alder reactions. The quinone acts as the dienophile and reacts with a diene at a carbon-carbon double bond.

In Diels–Alder reactions quinones are used as dienophiles. Historically important syntheses include cholesterol, cortisone, morphine, and reserpine.

== Occurrence and uses ==
=== Production of hydrogen peroxide ===
A large scale industrial application of quinones is for the production of hydrogen peroxide. 2-Alkylanthraquinones are hydrogenated to the corresponding hydroquinones (quinizarins), which then transfer H_{2} to oxygen:

dihydroanthraquinone + O_{2} → anthraquinone + H_{2}O_{2}

in this way, several million metric tons of H_{2}O_{2} are produced annually.

1,4-Naphthoquinone, derived by oxidation of naphthalene with chromium trioxide. It is the precursor to anthraquinone.

=== Biochemistry ===
Numerous quinones are significant roles in biology. Vitamin K, which is involved in coagulation of blood, is a quinone. Ubiquinone-10 is a naturally occurring 1,4-benzoquinone involved in respiration apparatus. Plastoquinone is a redox relay involved in photosynthesis. Pyrroloquinoline quinone is another biological redox cofactor.

Ubiquinones, as their name implies, are ubiquitous in living creatures, being components of respiratory apparatus.

Blattellaquinone, a sex pheromone in cockroaches

Quinones are conjectured to occur in all respiring organisms. Some serve as electron acceptors in electron transport chains such as those in photosynthesis (plastoquinone, phylloquinone), and aerobic respiration (ubiquinone). Phylloquinone is also known as vitamin K_{1}, as it is used by animals to carboxylate certain proteins, which are involved in blood coagulation, bone formation, and other processes. Conversely, the toxicity of paracetamol is due to its metabolism to a quinone imine, which then reacts with liver proteins to cause liver failure.

The auto-oxidation of the neurotransmitter dopamine and its precursor L-Dopa generates the comparatively stable dopamine quinone which inhibits the functioning of dopamine transporter (DAT) and the TH enzyme and leads to low mitochondrial ATP production.

The benzoquinone blattellaquinone is a sex pheromone in cockroaches. In the spray of bombardier beetles, hydroquinone reacts with hydrogen peroxide to produce a fiery blast of steam, a deterrent in the animal world.

=== Medical ===
Several quinones are of pharmacological interest. They form a major class of anticancer cytotoxins. One example is daunorubicin, which is antileukemic. Some of them show anti-tumoral activity. They embody some claims in herbal medicine. These applications include purgative (sennosides), antimicrobial and antiparasitic (rhein and saprorthoquinone, atovaquone), anti-tumor (emodin and juglone), inhibition of PGE2 biosynthesis (arnebinone and arnebifuranone) and anti-cardiovascular disease (tanshinone). Malbranchea cinnamomea is a thermophilic fungus, which produces a quinone antibiotic.

Another quinone-containing drug is Mecarbinate (dimecarbine), made by the reaction of ethyl N-methyl-β-aminocrotonate with para-benzoquinone. Others include Amendol, Oxyphemedol, Phemedol all in FR5142 (M) ― 1967-06-05. Note: These are all indoles made via the Nenitzescu indole synthesis. The antineoplastic Apaziquone.

Benzoquinone compounds are a metabolite of paracetamol.

=== Dyes ===
Many natural and artificial coloring substances (dyes and pigments) are quinone derivatives, for instance lawsone is the active dye compound in henna. They are second only to azo dyes in importance as dyestuffs, with particular emphasis on blue colors. Alizarin (1,2-dihydroxy-9,10-anthraquinone), extracted from the madder plant, was the first natural dye to be synthesized from coal tar.

=== Photography ===
A commercial application of quinones is in black-and-white photography. Black-and-white film is covered with an emulsion containing silver bromide or silver iodide crystals, which exposure to light activates. Hydroquinone is used to reduce the activated silver ions to metallic silver. During this process, hydroquinone is oxidized to quinone. All silver halide not activated by light or reduced by hydroquinone is removed, leaving a negative by deposited silver where the film had been struck by light.

== Nomenclature ==
Quinones are commonly named with a prefix that indicates the parent aromatic hydrocarbon ("benzo-" for benzene, "naphtho-" for naphthalene, "anthra-" for anthracene, etc.) and the "-quinone" suffix. Infix multipliers "-di-", "-tri-", "-tetra-" (etc.) are used when there are 4, 6, 8 (etc.) carbonyls. The position of the carbonyl groups can be indicated before the prefix (as in "1,4,5,8-naphthodiquinone") or after it ("anthra-1,4-quinone").

== Structural analogues of quinones ==
- Quinone methide – where one O is replaced by C
- Xylylene – where both O's are replaced by C's
- Quinone imine – where one O is replaced by N, illustrated by NAPQI
- Quinone diimine – where both O's are replaced by N's, illustrated by the antiseptic ambazone
- Azaxylylene – where both O's are replaced by one N and one C, illustrated by various fuchsine dyes like pararosaniline
