= 1,2-Benzoquinone =

Chemical compound

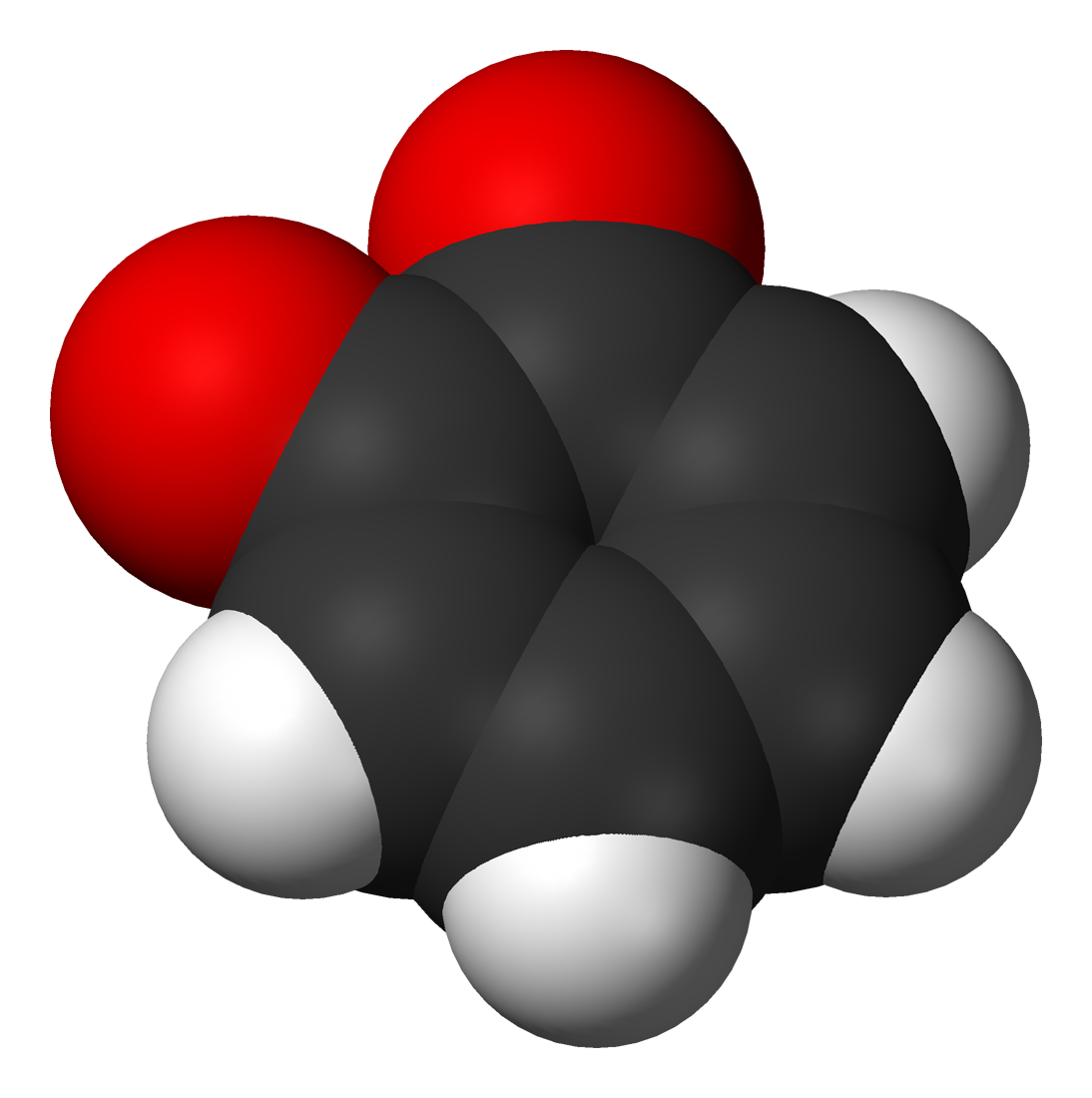

Names
- Preferred IUPAC name Cyclohexa-3,5-diene-1,2-dione
- Other names: ortho-Benzoquinone; o-Benzoquinone; o-Quinone

Identifiers
CAS Number	583-63-1
3D model (JSmol)	Interactive image; Interactive image
ChEBI	CHEBI:17253
ChemSpider	10941
ECHA InfoCard	100.243.463
KEGG	C02351
PubChem CID	11421
UNII	SVD1LJ47R7
CompTox Dashboard (EPA)	DTXSID60894765
- InChI: InChI=1S/C6H4O2/c7-5-3-1-2-4-6(5)8/h1-4H Key: WOAHJDHKFWSLKE-UHFFFAOYSA-N; InChI=1/C6H4O2/c7-5-3-1-2-4-6(5)8/h1-4H Key: WOAHJDHKFWSLKE-UHFFFAOYAR
- SMILES: O=C1/C=C\C=C/C1=O; C1=CC(=O)C(=O)C=C1

Properties
Chemical formula	C_{6}H_{4}O_{2}
Molar mass	108.096 g·mol^{−1}
Appearance	Red volatile solid
Density	1.424 g/cm^{3}
Melting point	60–70 °C (140–158 °F; 333–343 K) decomposes

Hazards
Flash point	76.4 °C (169.5 °F; 349.5 K)

Related compounds
Related compounds	1,4-benzoquinone quinone
- Except where otherwise noted, data are given for materials in their standard state (at 25 °C [77 °F], 100 kPa). verify (what is ?) Infobox references

1,2-Benzoquinone, also called ortho-benzoquinone, is an organic compound with formula C_{6}H_{4}O_{2}. It is one of the two isomers of quinone, the other being 1,4-benzoquinone. It is a red volatile solid that is soluble in water and diethyl ether. It is rarely encountered because of its instability, but it is of fundamental interest as the parent compound of many derivatives which are known.

== Structure ==
The molecule has C_{2v} symmetry. X-ray crystallography shows that the double bonds are localized, with alternatingly long and short C-C distances within the ring. The C=O distances of 1.21 Å are characteristic of ketones.

== Preparation and reactions ==
1,2-Benzoquinone is produced on oxidation of catechol exposed to air in aqueous solution or by ortho oxidation of a phenol.

A strain of the bacterium Pseudomonas mendocina metabolises benzoic acid, yielding 1,2-benzoquinone via catechol.

Ortho-quinones are widely used in organic synthesis.

== Occurrence of ortho-quinones ==
The oxidation of lysyl side chains is effected in nature by the action of an orthoquinone called lysyl tyrosylquinone.

4,5-Dimethyl-1,2-benzoquinone, also a red solid, is a well behaved synthetic ortho-quinone.

The biological pigment melanin is rich in ortho-quinones.

Finally, the enzyme cofactors tryptophan tryptophylquinone (TTQ), cysteine tryptophylquinone (CTQ), lysine tyrosylquinone (LTQ) and pyrroloquinoline quinone (PQQ) contain the ortho-quinone moiety in their chemical structure.

== See also ==
- 1,4-Benzoquinone
