= Hydroxyanthraquinone =

Class of chemical compounds

1,4-Dihydroxyanthraquinone, commonly called quinizarin is a common hydroxyanthroquinone.

In organic chemistry hydroxyanthraquinones refers to compounds with the formula C_{12}H_{8−n}(OH)_{n}(CO)_{2} where n ≥ 1. Almost all hydroxyanthraquinones are derivative of 9,10-anthraquinone.

== Isomers ==
One peculiarity of the hydroxyanthraquinones is the relative obscurity of the monohydroxy derivatives. Most hydroxyanthraquinones have two or more hydroxy groups.

=== Dihydroxy ===
Dihydroxyanthraquinones have the formula C_{12}H_{6}(OH)_{2}(CO)_{2}. The dyes alizarin (1,2-Dihydroxyanthraquinone) and quinizarin are prominent examples.

=== Trihydroxy ===
Trihydroxyanthraquinones have the formula C_{12}H_{5}(OH)_{3}(CO)_{2}. 1,2,4-Trihydroxyanthraquinone, commonly called purpurin, is a naturally occurring red/yellow dye.

=== Tetrahydroxy ===
Tetrahydroxyanthraquinones have the formula C_{12}H_{4}(OH)_{4}(CO)_{2}. The dye quinalizarin (1,2,5,8-tetrahydroxyanthraquinone is one example.

=== Hexahydroxy ===
Hexahydroxyanthraquinones have the formula C_{12}H_{2}(OH)_{6}(CO)_{2}.1,2,3,5,6,7-hexahydroxy-9,10-anthraquinone (rufigallol) occurs in nature.

== See also ==
- Hydroxybenzoquinone
- Hydroxynaphthoquinone
