= 1,4-Benzoquinone =

Chemical compound

Skeletal formula
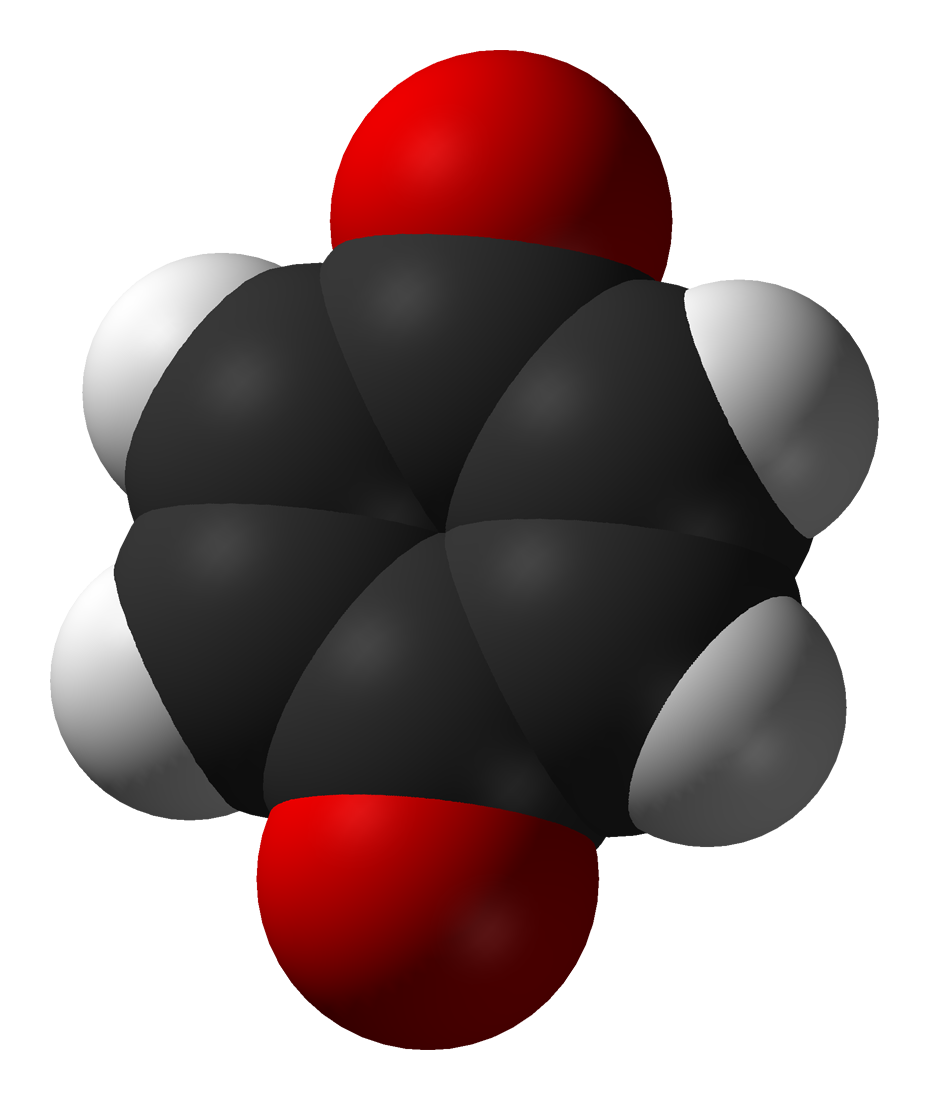
Space-filling model
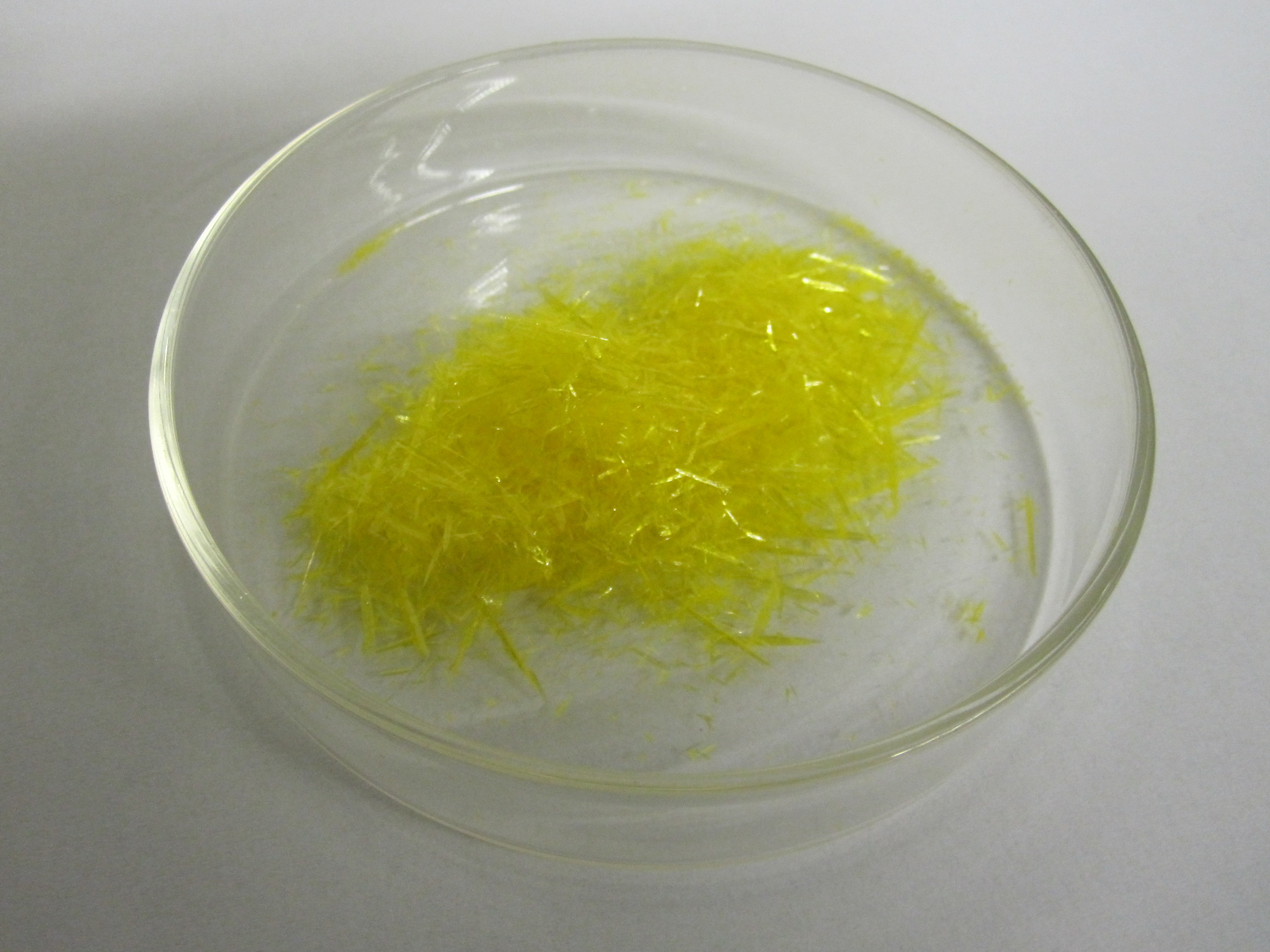

Names
- Preferred IUPAC name Cyclohexa-2,5-diene-1,4-dione
- Other names 1,4-Benzoquinone; Benzoquinone p-Benzoquinone p-Quinone

Identifiers
| CAS Number | 106-51-4 |
| 3D model (JSmol) | Interactive image; Interactive image |
| Beilstein Reference | 773967 |
| ChEBI | CHEBI:16509 |
| ChEMBL | ChEMBL8320 |
| ChemSpider | 4489 |
| ECHA InfoCard | 100.003.097 |
| EC Number | 203-405-2 |
| Gmelin Reference | 2741 |
| IUPHAR/BPS | 6307 |
| KEGG | C00472 |
| PubChem CID | 4650 |
| RTECS number | DK2625000 |
| UNII | 3T006GV98U |
| UN number | 2587 |
| CompTox Dashboard (EPA) | DTXSID6020145 |
- InChI: InChI=1S/C6H4O2/c7-5-1-2-6(8)4-3-5/h1-4H Key: AZQWKYJCGOJGHM-UHFFFAOYSA-N; InChI=1/C6H4O2/c7-5-1-2-6(8)4-3-5/h1-4H Key: AZQWKYJCGOJGHM-UHFFFAOYAR
- SMILES: O=C\1\C=C/C(=O)/C=C/1; C1=CC(=O)C=CC1=O

Properties
| Chemical formula | C_{6}H_{4}O_{2} |
| Molar mass | 108.096 g·mol^{−1} |
| Appearance | Yellow solid |
| Odor | Acrid, chlorine-like |
| Density | 1.318 g/cm^{3} at 20 °C |
| Melting point | 115 °C (239 °F; 388 K) |
| Boiling point | Sublimes |
| Solubility in water | 11 g/L (18 °C) |
| Solubility | Slightly soluble in petroleum ether; soluble in acetone; 10% in ethanol, benzene, diethyl ether |
| Vapor pressure | 0.1 mmHg (25 °C) |
| Magnetic susceptibility (χ) | −38.4·10^{−6} cm^{3}/mol |

Hazards
- Occupational safety and health (OHS/OSH)
| Main hazards | Toxic |
- GHS labelling
| Pictograms | (GHS06: Toxic) (GHS07: Exclamation mark) (GHS09: Environmental hazard) |
| Signal word | Danger |
| Hazard statements | H301, H315, H319, H331, H335, H400 |
| Precautionary statements | P261, P264, P270, P271, P273, P280, P301+P310, P302+P352, P304+P340, P305+P351+P338, P311, P312, P321, P330, P332+P313, P337+P313, P362, P391, P403+P233, P405, P501 |
| Flash point | 38 to 93 °C; 100 to 200 °F; 311 to 366 K |
- Lethal dose or concentration (LD, LC)
| LD_{50} (median dose) | 296 mg/kg (mammal, subcutaneous); 93.8 mg/kg (mouse, subcutaneous); 8.5 mg/kg (mouse, IP); 5.6 mg/kg (rat); 130 mg/kg (rat, oral); 25 mg/kg (rat, IV) |
- NIOSH (US health exposure limits)
| PEL (Permissible) | TWA 0.4 mg/m^{3} (0.1 ppm) |
| REL (Recommended) | TWA 0.4 mg/m^{3} (0.1 ppm) |
| IDLH (Immediate danger) | 100 mg/m^{3} |

Related compounds
| Related compounds | 1,2-Benzoquinone |
- Except where otherwise noted, data are given for materials in their standard state (at 25 °C [77 °F], 100 kPa). verify (what is ?) Infobox references

1,4-Benzoquinone, commonly known as para-quinone, is a chemical compound with the formula C_{6}H_{4}O_{2}. In a pure state, it forms bright-yellow crystals with a characteristic irritating odor, resembling that of chlorine, bleach, and hot plastic or formaldehyde. This six-membered ring compound is the oxidized derivative of 1,4-hydroquinone. The molecule is multifunctional: it exhibits properties of a ketone, being able to form oximes; an oxidant, forming the dihydroxy derivative; and an alkene, undergoing addition reactions, especially those typical for α,β-unsaturated ketones. 1,4-Benzoquinone is sensitive toward both strong mineral acids and alkali, which cause condensation and decomposition of the compound.

== Preparation ==
1,4-Benzoquinone is prepared industrially by oxidation of hydroquinone, which can be obtained by several routes. One route involves oxidation of diisopropylbenzene and the Hock rearrangement. The net reaction can be represented as follows:

$$\ce{C6H4(CHMe2)2  +  3 O2 ->   C6H4O2 +  2 OCMe2  +  H2O}$$

The reaction proceeds via the bis(hydroperoxide) and the hydroquinone. Acetone is a coproduct.

Another major process involves the direct hydroxylation of phenol by acidic hydrogen peroxide:

$$\ce{C6H5OH  +  H2O2 -> C6H4(OH)2 +  H2O}$$

Both hydroquinone and catechol are produced. Subsequent oxidation of the hydroquinone gives the quinone.

1,4-Benzoquinone was originally prepared industrially by oxidation of aniline, for example by manganese dioxide. This method is mainly practiced in China where environmental regulations are more relaxed.

Oxidation of hydroquinone is facile. One such method makes use of hydrogen peroxide as the oxidizer and iodine or an iodine salt as a catalyst for the oxidation occurring in a polar solvent such as isopropyl alcohol.

When heated to near its melting point, 1,4-benzoquinone sublimes, even at atmospheric pressure, allowing for an effective purification. Impure samples are often dark-colored due to the presence of quinhydrone, a dark green 1:1 charge-transfer complex of quinone with hydroquinone.

== Structure and redox ==
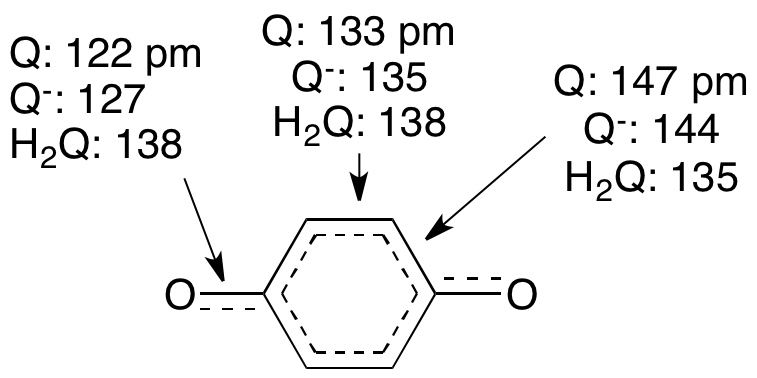
C–C and C–O bond distances in benzoquinone (Q), its 1e reduced derivative (Q^{−}), and hydroquinone (H_{2}Q).

Benzoquinone is a planar molecule with localized, alternating C=C, C=O, and C–C bonds. Reduction gives the semiquinone anion C_{6}H_{4}O_{2}^{−}}, which adopts a more delocalized structure. Further reduction coupled to protonation gives the hydroquinone, in which the electrons of the C6 ring are fully delocalized.

== Reactions and applications ==
Benzoquinonium is a skeletal muscle relaxant, ganglion blocking agent that is made from benzoquinone.

=== Organic synthesis ===
It is used as a hydrogen acceptor and oxidant in organic synthesis. 1,4-Benzoquinone serves as a dehydrogenation reagent. It is also used as a dienophile in Diels-Alder reactions.

Benzoquinone reacts with acetic anhydride and sulfuric acid to give the triacetate of hydroxyquinol. This reaction is called the Thiele reaction or Thiele–Winter reaction after Johannes Thiele, who first described it in 1898, and after Ernst Winter, who further described its reaction mechanism in 1900. An application is found in this step of the total synthesis of Metachromin A:

An application of the Thiele reaction, involving a benzoquinone derivative.

Benzoquinone is also used to suppress double-bond migration during olefin metathesis reactions.

An acidic potassium iodide solution reduces a solution of benzoquinone to hydroquinone, which can be reoxidized back to the quinone with a solution of silver nitrate.

Due to its ability to function as an oxidizer, 1,4-benzoquinone can be found in methods using the Wacker-Tsuji oxidation, wherein a palladium salt catalyzes the conversion of an alkene to a ketone. This reaction is typically carried out using pressurized oxygen as the oxidizer, but benzoquinone can sometimes preferred. It is also used as a reagent in some variants on Wacker oxidations.

1,4-Benzoquinone is used in the synthesis of Bromadol and related analogs.

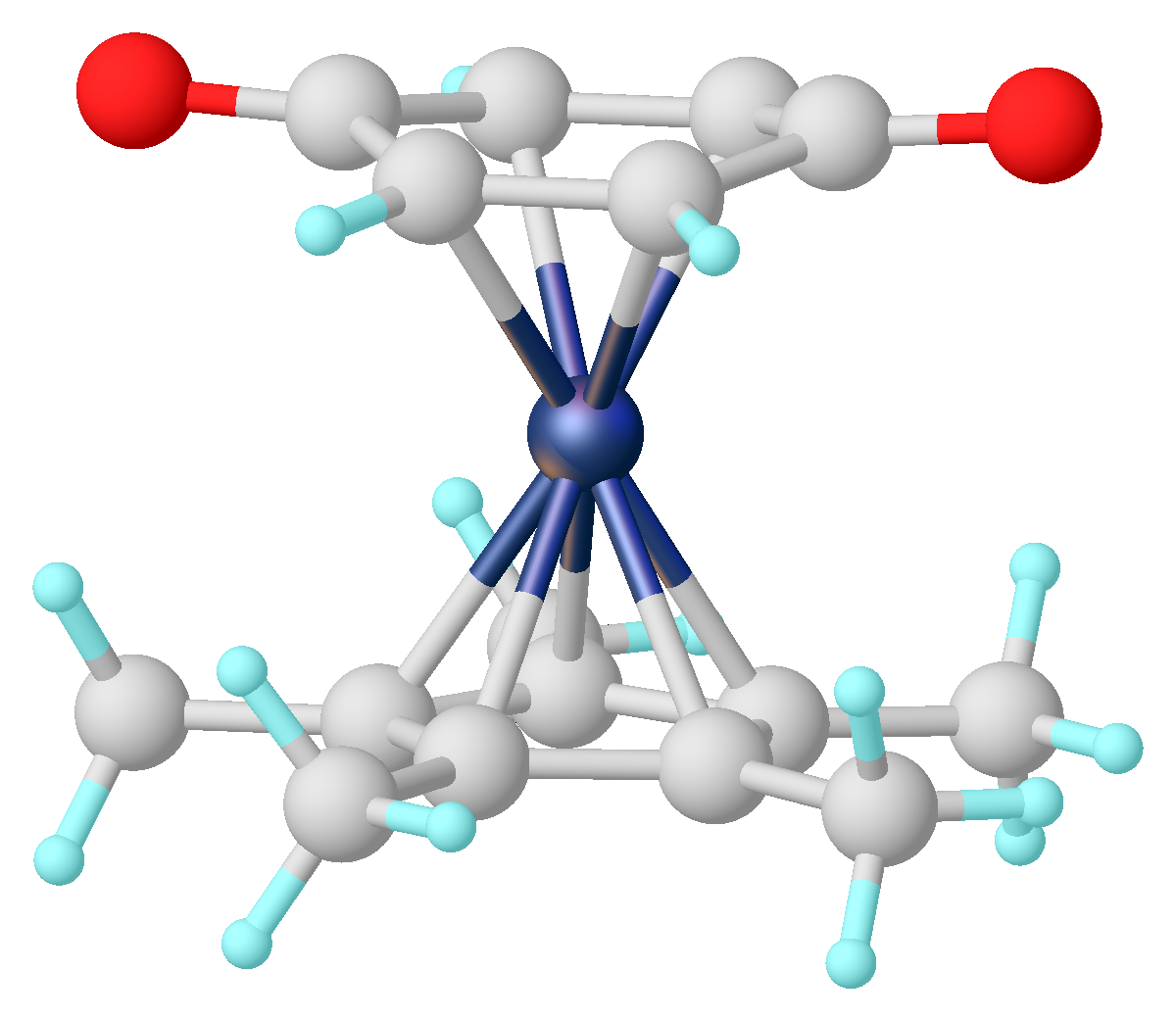
Structure of Cp*Rh(para-quinone).

== Related 1,4-benzoquinones ==
2,3-Dichloro-5,6-dicyano-1,4-benzoquinone (DDQ) is a stronger oxidant and dehydrogenation agent than 1,4-benzoquinone. Chloranil 1,4-C_{6}Cl_{4}O_{2} is another potent oxidant and dehydrogenation agent. Monochloro-p-benzoquinone is yet another but milder oxidant.

== Metabolism ==
1,4-Benzoquinone is a toxic metabolite found in human blood and can be used to track exposure to benzene or mixtures containing benzene and benzene compounds, such as petrol. The compound can interfere with cellular respiration, and kidney damage has been found in animals receiving severe exposure. It is excreted in its original form and also as variations of its own metabolite, hydroquinone.

== Safety ==
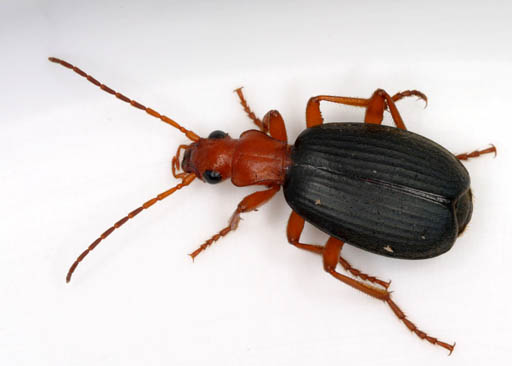
The bombardier beetle sprays 1,4-benzoquinone to deter predators

1,4-Benzoquinone is able to stain skin dark brown, cause erythema (redness, rashes on skin) and lead on to localized tissue necrosis. It is particularly irritating to the eyes and respiratory system. Its ability to sublime at commonly encountered temperatures allows for a greater airborne exposure risk than might be expected for a room-temperature solid. IARC has found insufficient evidence to comment on the compound's carcinogenicity, but has noted that it can easily pass into the bloodstream and that it showed activity in depressing bone marrow production in mice and can inhibit protease enzymes involved in cellular apoptosis.

== See also ==
- Tetrahydroxybenzoquinone
- Benzoquinonetetracarboxylic acid
- 1,2-Benzoquinone
- Quinones
- Duroquinone
- Ardisiaquinone
