= C10H6O4 =

The molecular formula C_{10}H_{6}O_{4} may refer to:

- α-Furil, a furan compound
- Dihydroxynaphthoquinone
  - Naphthazarin, a naturally occurring organic compound, one of many dihydroxynaphthoquinone structural isomers
