= Ayhan Ulubelen =

Turkish analytical chemist (1931–2020)

- A student's drawing of Ulubelen
- Born: 20 August 1931; Istanbul, Turkey
- Died: 29 November 2020 (aged 89)
- Education: University of Istanbul
- Known for: Testing plants from Turkey and each separate compound in the plants for medical needs
- Scientific career
- Fields: Analytical Chemistry
- Workplaces: University of Istanbul

Ayhan Ulubelen (20 August 1931 – 29 November 2020) was a Turkish analytical chemist. She was a member of the Turkish Academy of Sciences. Ulubelen contributed to the isolation and testing of natural products from Turkish plants relevant to spontaneous abortion, cancer, HIV, and diabetes.

== Life and career ==
Ulubelen was born August 20, 1931, in Istanbul, Turkey. Her father was an army officer, and her mother was a housewife. In high school, she saw a movie about Madame Curie and soon wanted to be a chemist. She sought a position in chemical industry, but became analytical chemist at the Faculty of Pharmacy of Istanbul University, partly through her having passed the language examination.

She received her degree in analytical chemistry at Istanbul University in 1956, followed by two years of postdoctoral research at the University of Minnesota under Dr. Ole Gisvold (head of the Dept. of Medicinal Chemistry) and then by four years of cancer research at the University of Arizona. In 1976, she became a full professor at Istanbul University, while spending several months at each of: Japan (support by JSPS), Germany (support by DAAD), and the University of Texas at Austin (support by NATO).

Ulubelen has published more than 300 papers, and has authored two books and 12 chapters in international books; her work has received support from Fulbright, NIH, DAAD, JSPS, and NATO. She has mentored over 20 graduate students, of whom many have proceeded to prominent positions in academia, as well as pharmaceutical and chemical companies.

Ulubelen died from COVID-19 on 29 November 2020, at the age of 89.

== Research ==
Ulubelen's research focuses on isolation, structure determination, and pharmacological investigation of Turkish plants and compounds isolated from them, and especially on isolates from plants abundant in Turkey and mentioned in Turkish folklore and medicine. Her work with triterpenes and flavonoids was followed by work on diterpenoids, to find plant components that produce various medical effects including spontaneous abortion and wound healing.

During tests on mice, Ulubelen found an abortive factor developing cystic degeneration in the ovaries, but was unsure whether the effect was caused by the abortive agent or by some other compound. Ten compounds from the source plant were studied, including screening by a Faculty of Medicine group for toxic effects to the ovaries, livers, kidneys, and brain. At that time, Ulubelen said

"...we can't recommend that women should be using these plants as an abortive agent. We have so informed the pharmacist who sent them to us, and I'm sure she's passing this information on to the villagers."

3-Benzoxepin does not occur naturally but is the skeletal moiety around which several natural products are built, including perilloxin (I) from Perilla frutescens var. crispa and tenual (II) and tenucarb (III) from Asphodeline tenuior, which Ulubelen helped to isolate.

== Honors ==
Ulubelen's honors include: Honorary Membership to the Chemical Society of Turkey (first award recipient, 1985), NATO Scientific Committee membership (selected from among ten NATO countries, 1986–1990), Science Award by the Scientific and Technological Research Council of Turkey (1991), full member (1994–2001) and honorary member of the Turkish Academy of Sciences (2001-2020), and the American Pharmaceutical Association Young Scientist awards (1962, 1963, 1964). She has served in the Chemrawn Committee of IUPAC as an associate and full member (2003–2009).
