= C16H16O6 =

The molecular formula C_{16}H_{16}O_{6} (molar mass: 304.29 g/mol, exact mass: 304.094696 u) may refer to:

- Austrocortilutein
- Meciadanol
- Nigrosporin B
- Sappanol, a homoisoflavonoid
