= C10H6O2 =

The molecular formula C_{10}H_{6}O_{2} (molar mass: 158.15 g/mol, exact mass: 158.0368 u) may refer to:

- Naphthoquinone
  - 1,2-Naphthoquinone
  - 1,4-Naphthoquinone
