= Spinochrome =

Spinochrome can refer to any of a series of chemical compounds:

- Spinochrome B (2,3,5,7-tetrahydroxy-1,4-naphthalenedione)
- Spinochrome D (2,3,5,6,8-pentahydroxy-1,4-naphthalenedione)
- Spinochrome E (hexahydroxy-1,4-naphthalenedione)
