= Benzoxepin =

- 1-Benzoxepin

- 2-Benzoxepin

- 3-Benzoxepin

Identifiers
CAS Number	1-: 213-22-9; 2-: 264-25-5; 3-: 264-13-1
3D model (JSmol)	1-: Interactive image; 2-: Interactive image; 3-: Interactive image
ChemSpider	1-: 10289216; 3-: 2892804
PubChem CID	1-: 12254036; 2-: 20256803; 3-: 3659427
UNII	MWA8J394LK
CompTox Dashboard (EPA)	2-: DTXSID90604213
- InChI: 1-: InChI=1S/C10H8O/c1-2-7-10-9(5-1)6-3-4-8-11-10/h1-8H Key: LWZYUACNWRVDDJ-UHFFFAOYSA-N; 2-: InChI=1S/C10H8O/c1-2-5-10-8-11-7-3-6-9(10)4-1/h1-8H Key: GXFIQHWKGLBSLN-UHFFFAOYSA-N; 3-: InChI=1S/C10H8O/c1-2-4-10-6-8-11-7-5-9(10)3-1/h1-8H Key: APSZPCTXHHKIQO-UHFFFAOYSA-N
- SMILES: 1-: c1ccc2c(c1)C=CC=CO2; 2-: C1=CC2=CC=COC=C2C=C1; 3-: C1=CC=C2C=COC=CC2=C1

Related compounds
Other anions	benzazepine
- Except where otherwise noted, data are given for materials in their standard state (at 25 °C [77 °F], 100 kPa). Infobox references

Benzoxepin (BOX) is an oxygen-containing bicyclic molecule consisting of an oxepin ring and a benzene ring. There are three isomers, varying in where the oxygen is positioned in the oxepin heterocycle relative where the benzene is fused to it.

== Natural occurrence ==
1-Benzoxepin, with the oxygen closest to the benzene, is found in the skeleton of several fungal metabolites.

2-Benzoxepin skeletons are likewise found in fungal metabolites.

3-Benzoxepin, with the oxygen furthest from the benzene, is the core of natural products such as perilloxin from Perilla frutescens (variant Acuta) and tenual and tenucarb from Asphodeline tenuior.

Structural formulas of perilloxin, tenual, and tenucarb

== Derivatives ==
Certain substituted benzoxepins, like TFMBOX, are serotonergic psychedelics.
