= C10H8O =

C_{10}H_{8}O may refer to:

- Naphthols
  - 1-Naphthol
  - 2-Naphthol
- Benzoxepins
  - 1-Benzoxepin
  - 2-Benzoxepin
  - 3-Benzoxepin
- Hydroxyazulenes
  - 1-Hydroxyazulene
  - 2-Hydroxyazulene
  - 4-Hydroxyazulene
  - 5-Hydroxyazulene
  - 6-Hydroxyazulene
- Phenylfurans
  - 2-Phenylfuran
  - 3-Phenylfuran
