= Dihydroxynaphthoquinone =

A dihydroxynaphthoquinone (formula: C_{10}H_{6}O_{4}) is any of several organic compounds that can be viewed as derivatives of naphthoquinone through replacement of two hydrogen atoms (H) by hydroxyl groups (OH).

The unqualified term "dihydroxynaphthoquinone" usually means a derivative of 1,4-naphthoquinone. Other dihydroxy- compounds can be derived from the two other known isomers, 1,2-naphthoquinone (ortho-) and 2,6-naphthoquinone (amphi-).

== Isomers ==
=== From 1,4-naphthoquinone ===
Due to the symmetry of the parent quinone, there are only nine distinct isomers of dihydroxy-1,4-naphthoquinone:

- 2,3-Dihydroxy-1,4-naphthoquinone.
- 2,5-Dihydroxy-1,4-naphthoquinone.
- 2,6-Dihydroxy-1,4-naphthoquinone.
- 2,7-Dihydroxy-1,4-naphthoquinone.
- 2,8-Dihydroxy-1,4-naphthoquinone.
- 5,6-Dihydroxy-1,4-naphthoquinone.
- 5,7-Dihydroxy-1,4-naphthoquinone.
- 5,8-Dihydroxy-1,4-naphthoquinone (naphthazarin).
- 6,7-Dihydroxy-1,4-naphthoquinone.

=== From 1,2-naphthoquinone ===
From 1,2-naphthoquinone there are 12 possible dihydroxy- isomers:

- 3,4-Dihydroxy-1,2-naphthoquinone
- 3,5-Dihydroxy-1,2-naphthoquinone
- 3,6-Dihydroxy-1,2-naphthoquinone
- 3,7-Dihydroxy-1,2-naphthoquinone
- 3,8-Dihydroxy-1,2-naphthoquinone
- 4,5-Dihydroxy-1,2-naphthoquinone
- 4,6-Dihydroxy-1,2-naphthoquinone
- 4,7-Dihydroxy-1,2-naphthoquinone
- 4,8-Dihydroxy-1,2-naphthoquinone
- 5,6-Dihydroxy-1,2-naphthoquinone
- 5,7-Dihydroxy-1,2-naphthoquinone
- 5,8-Dihydroxy-1,2-naphthoquinone
- 6,7-Dihydroxy-1,2-naphthoquinone
- 6,8-Dihydroxy-1,2-naphthoquinone
- 7,8-Dihydroxy-1,2-naphthoquinone

=== From 2,6-naphthoquinone ===
From the symmetrical 2,6-naphthoquinone there are only nine dihydroxy- isomers:

- 1,3-Dihydroxy-2,6-naphthoquinone
- 1,4-Dihydroxy-2,6-naphthoquinone
- 1,5-Dihydroxy-2,6-naphthoquinone
- 1,7-Dihydroxy-2,6-naphthoquinone
- 1,8-Dihydroxy-2,6-naphthoquinone
- 3,4-Dihydroxy-2,6-naphthoquinone
- 3,7-Dihydroxy-2,6-naphthoquinone
- 3,8-Dihydroxy-2,6-naphthoquinone
- 4,8-Dihydroxy-2,6-naphthoquinone

== See also ==
- Hydroxynaphthoquinone
- Trihydroxynaphthoquinone
- Dihydroxyanthraquinone
