= Naphthablin =

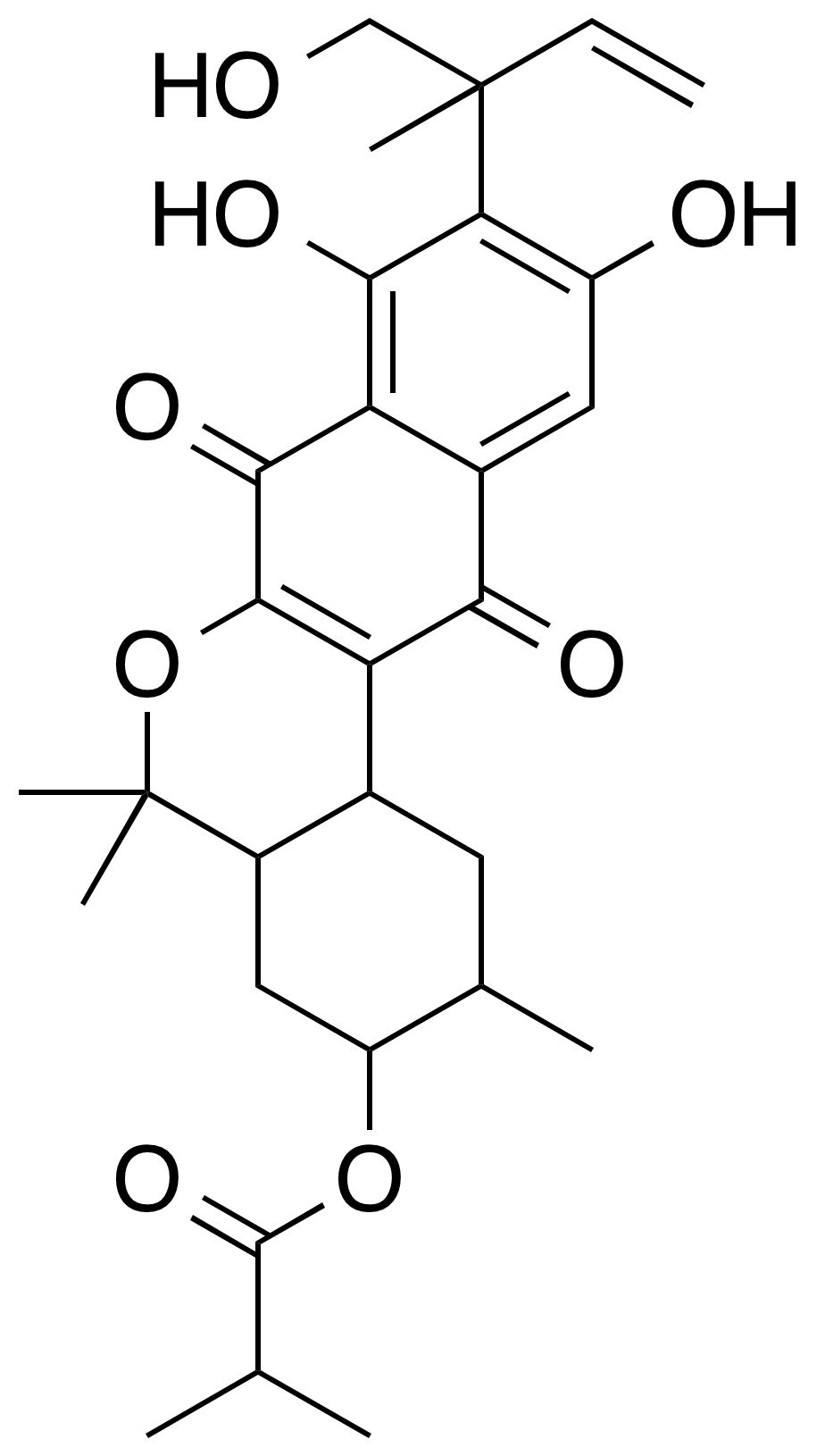

Names
- IUPAC name [8,10-dihydroxy-9-(1-hydroxy-2-methylbut-3-en-2-yl)-2,5,5-trimethyl-7,12-dioxo-1,2,3,4,4a,12b-hexahydronaphtho[2,3-c]isochromen-3-yl] 2-methylpropanoate

Identifiers
3D model (JSmol)	Interactive image
ChemSpider	8068297
PubChem CID	9892627
- InChI: InChI=1S/C29H36O8/c1-8-29(7,12-30)22-18(31)10-16-20(24(22)33)25(34)26-21(23(16)32)15-9-14(4)19(36-27(35)13(2)3)11-17(15)28(5,6)37-26/h8,10,13-15,17,19,30-31,33H,1,9,11-12H2,2-7H3 Key: NPKRLSYRZGLPCT-UHFFFAOYSA-N
- SMILES: CC1CC2C(CC1OC(=O)C(C)C)C(OC3=C2C(=O)C4=CC(=C(C(=C4C3=O)O)C(C)(CO)C=C)O)(C)C

Properties
Chemical formula	C_{29}H_{36}O_{8}
Molar mass	512.599 g·mol^{−1}
- Except where otherwise noted, data are given for materials in their standard state (at 25 °C [77 °F], 100 kPa). Infobox references

Naphthablin is a naphthoquinone compound with the molecular formula C_{29}H_{36}O_{8} which is produced by the bacterium Streptomyces aculeolatus.
