= C14H14O4 =

The molecular formula C_{14}H_{14}O_{4} (molar mass: 246.262 g/mol) may refer to:

- Marmesin (nodakenetin)
- Tenual
