= Streptomyces lateritius =

Scientific classification
- Domain: Bacteria
- Kingdom: Bacillati
- Phylum: Actinomycetota
- Class: Actinomycetia
- Order: Streptomycetales
- Family: Streptomycetaceae
- Genus: Streptomyces
- Species: S. lateritius

Binomial name
- Streptomyces lateritius (Sveshnikova 1957) Pridham et al. 1958 (Approved Lists 1980)

Type strain
- AS 4.1427, ATCC 19776, ATCC 19913, BCRC 13774, CBS 262.66, CBS 514.68, CCRC 13774, CGMCC 4.1427, DSM 40163, ETH 28441, IFO 12788, INA 6993, ISP 5163, JCM 4389, KCC S-0389, KCTC 19962, Lanoot R-8740, LMG 19372, NBRC 12788, NRRL B-5349, NRRL B-5423, NRRL B-B-5423, NRRL-ISP 5163, R-8740, RIA 1056, UNIQEM 162, VKM Ac-1849, VKM Ac-577

Synonyms
- "Actinomyces lateritius" Sveshnikova 1957

Species of bacterium

Streptomyces lateritius is a bacterium species from the genus of Streptomyces which has been isolated from soil. Streptomyces lateritius produces the naphthoquinone antibiotic granatomycin D.

== See also ==
- List of Streptomyces species
