= Echinochrome A =

- Skeletal formula

Names
- Preferred IUPAC name 6-ethyl-2,3,5,7,8-pentahydroxynaphthalene-1,4-dione
- Other names 7-ethyl-2,3,5,6,8-pentahydroxy-1,4-nafphtoquinone; 6-Ethyl-2,7-trihydroxynaphthazarin; 6-ethyl-2,3,5,7,8-pentahydroxy-2-Ethyl-3,5,6,7,8-pentahydroxy-[1,4]naphthoquinone

Identifiers
CAS Number	517-82-8
3D model (JSmol)	Interactive image
ChEMBL	ChEMBL155722
ChemSpider	13474075
PubChem CID	135457951
UNII	J4L83T8MZ5
CompTox Dashboard (EPA)	DTXSID60276542
- InChI: InChI=1S/C12H10O7/c1-2-3-6(13)4-5(8(15)7(3)14)10(17)12(19)11(18)9(4)16/h13-15,18-19H,2H2,1H3 Key: DNRFNICCPHGYAX-UHFFFAOYSA-N
- SMILES: CCC1=C(C2=C(C(=C1O)O)C(=O)C(=C(C2=O)O)O)O

Properties
Chemical formula	C_{12}H_{10}O_{7}
Molar mass	266.205 g·mol^{−1}
Appearance	Dark red crystalline powder
Melting point	−219 to 221.5 °C (−362.2 to 430.7 °F; 54.1 to 494.6 K)
Solubility in water	Practically insoluble
Solubility	Moderately soluble in ethanol; very slightly soluble in chloroform
- Except where otherwise noted, data are given for materials in their standard state (at 25 °C [77 °F], 100 kPa). Infobox references

Echinochrome A (7-ethyl-2,3,5,6,8-pentahydroxy-1,4-naphthoquinone) is a polyhydroxylated 1,4-naphthoquinone, a type of pigments commonly found in sea urchin shell ("test"), spine, gonads, coelomic fluid, and eggs, of sea urchin. These types of pigments are commonly known as spinochromes and are natural marine phenolic compounds with potential pharmacological effects and modes of action.

First extracted from the sea urchin Scaphechinus mirabilis, it is the active substance of histochrome and Echino-A. Histochrome is used for ophthalmic diseases and ischemic heart disease. Echino-A has been used in nutraceutical form to diminish glucose levels, cholesterol and tryglicerides. The properties of echinochrome A as an antioxidant has made it the subject of scientific and clinical studies for more than 30 years.

The several hydroxyl groups have the ability to diminish reactive oxygen species (ROS) in cells, preventing redox imbalance. Echinochrome A has been found to target ophthalmologic, cardiovascular, cerebrovascular, inflammatory and metabolic diseases through its biological functions by targeting specific molecular signals. The regulation effects produced by echinochrome A in the cells makes this molecule a candidate to improve health. Sea urchins are known for their putative health properties for centuries, for example in the Materia medica of the Ming Dynasty authored by Li Zhongli in 1647.

== See also ==
- Ozopromide
