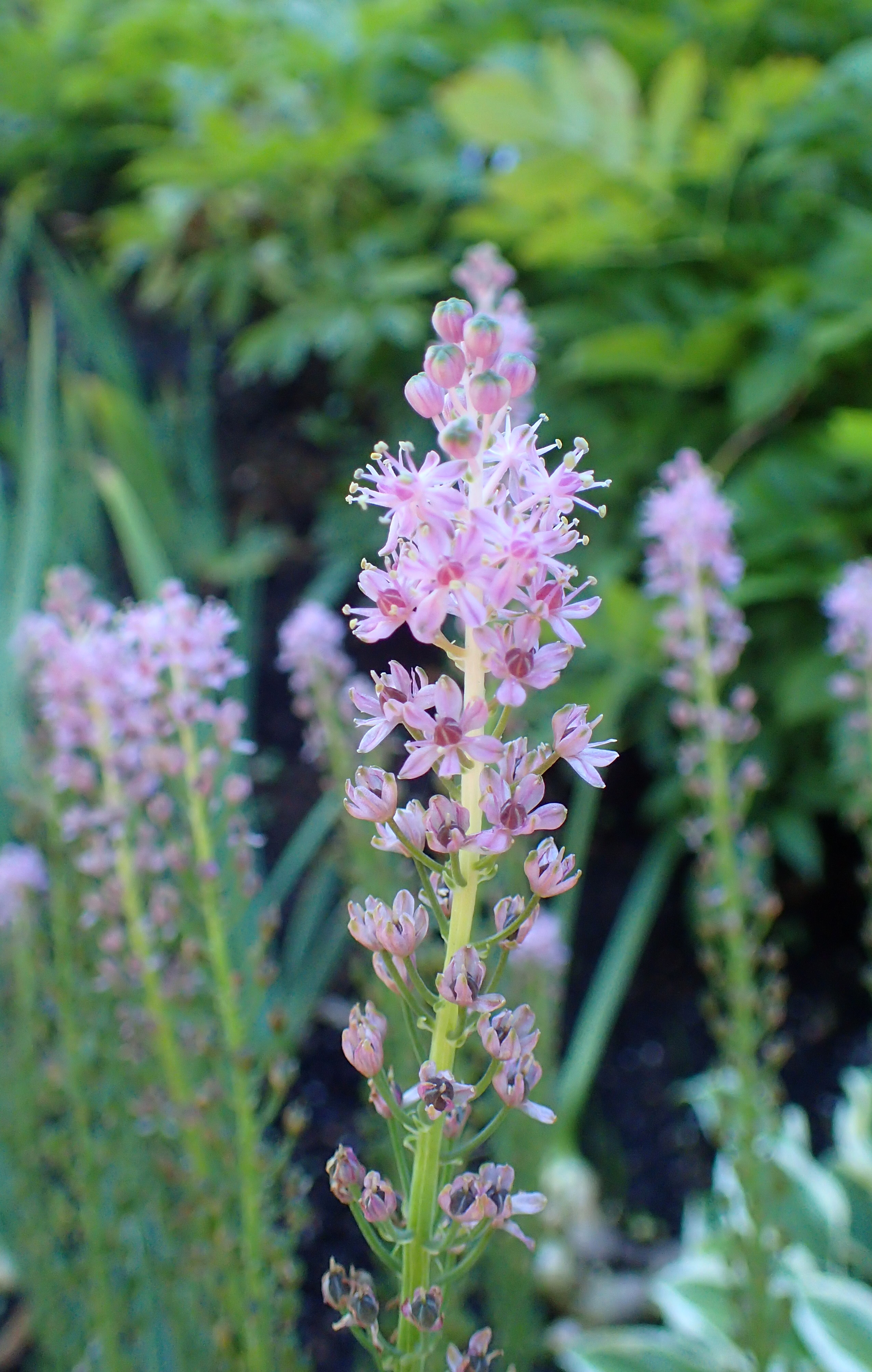
- Barnardia numidica in flower

Scientific classification
- Kingdom: Plantae
- Clade: Tracheophytes
- Clade: Angiosperms
- Clade: Monocots
- Order: Asparagales
- Family: Asparagaceae
- Subfamily: Scilloideae
- Genus: Barnardia
- Species: B. numidica

Binomial name
- Barnardia numidica (Poir.) Speta

Synonyms
- Scilla numidica Poir.; Prospero parviflorum (Steinh.) Salisb.; Scilla numidica subsp. ebusitana Romo; Scilla parviflora Desf.; Stellaris parviflora Steinh.

= Barnardia numidica =

Species of plant

Barnardia numidica is a bulbous flowering plant in the family Asparagaceae, subfamily Scilloideae (also treated as the family Hyacinthaceae). It is one of the two species of the genus Barnardia, although evidence suggests that B. numidica is not related to the other species B. japonica and should be transferred to a genus of its own.
