= 1,4-Naphthoquinone =

Naphthoquinone

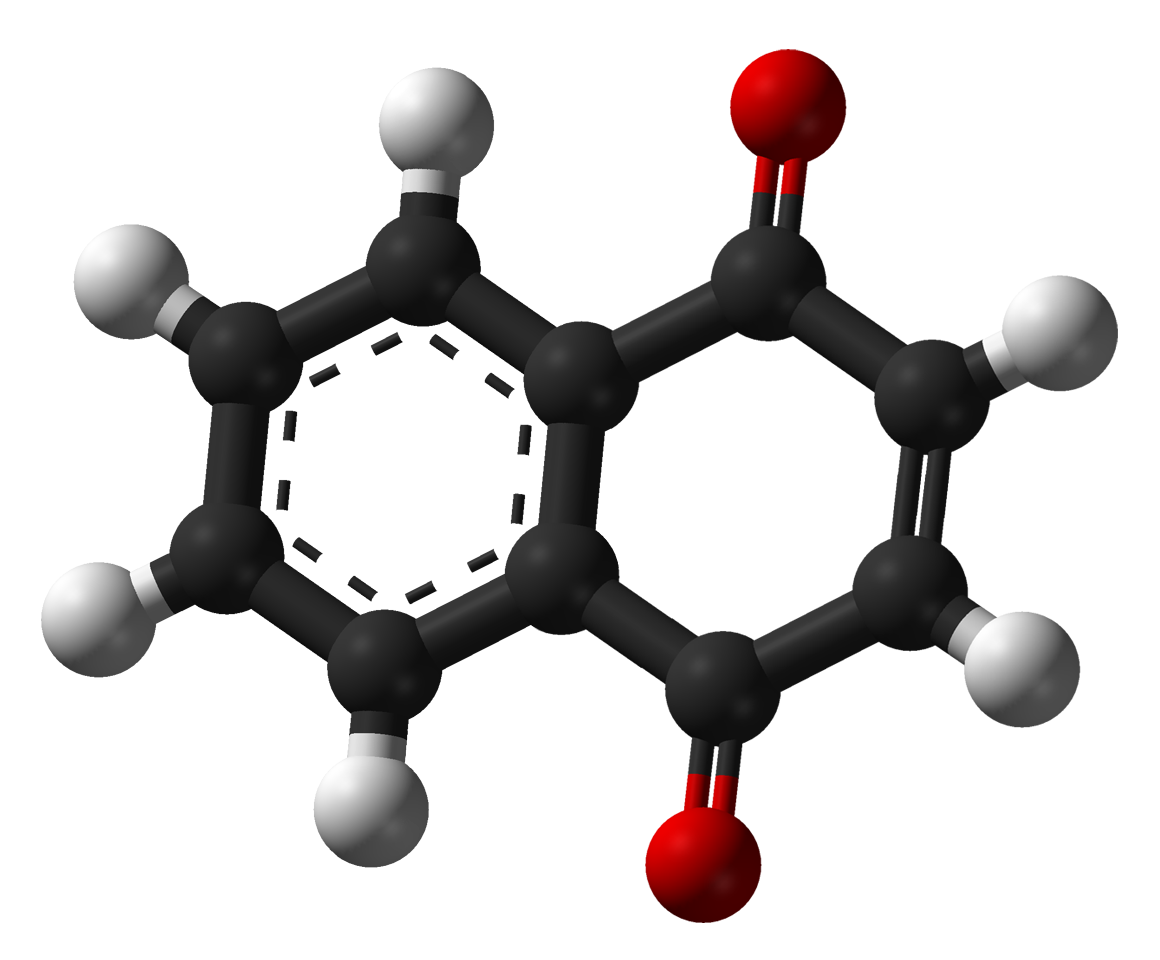
- Ball-and-stick model

Names
- Preferred IUPAC name Naphthalene-1,4-dione
- Other names 1,4-Naphthoquinone; Naphthoquinone α-Naphthoquinone

Identifiers
CAS Number	130-15-4
3D model (JSmol)	Interactive image
ChEMBL	ChEMBL55934
ChemSpider	8215
ECHA InfoCard	100.004.526
PubChem CID	8530
UNII	RBF5ZU7R7K
CompTox Dashboard (EPA)	DTXSID5040704
- InChI: InChI=1S/C10H6O2/c11-9-5-6-10(12)8-4-2-1-3-7(8)9/h1-6H Key: FRASJONUBLZVQX-UHFFFAOYSA-N; InChI=1/C10H6O2/c11-9-5-6-10(12)8-4-2-1-3-7(8)9/h1-6H Key: FRASJONUBLZVQX-UHFFFAOYAK
- SMILES: O=C1c2ccccc2C(=O)cc1

Properties
Chemical formula	C_{10}H_{6}O_{2}
Molar mass	158.15 g/mol
Density	1.422 g/cm^{3}
Melting point	126 °C (259 °F; 399 K)
Boiling point	Begins to sublime at 100 °C
Solubility in water	0.09 g/L
Magnetic susceptibility (χ)	−73.5·10^{−6} cm^{3}/mol
- Except where otherwise noted, data are given for materials in their standard state (at 25 °C [77 °F], 100 kPa). verify (what is ?) Infobox references

1,4-Naphthoquinone or para-naphthoquinone is a quinone derived from naphthalene. It forms volatile yellow triclinic crystals and has a sharp odor similar to benzoquinone. It is almost insoluble in cold water, slightly soluble in petroleum ether, and more soluble in polar organic solvents. In alkaline solutions it produces a reddish-brown color.

Natural vitamin K is a derivative of 1,4-naphthoquinone. It is a planar molecule with one aromatic ring fused to a quinone subunit. 1,4-naphathoquinone itself has some vitamin K activity.

It is an isomer of 1,2-naphthoquinone.

== Preparation ==
The industrial synthesis involves aerobic oxidation of naphthalene over a vanadium oxide catalyst:

C_{10}H_{8} + 3/2 O_{2} → C_{10}H_{6}O_{2} + H_{2}O

However, naphthoquinone rapidly oxidizes to phthalic anhydride under these conditions, and the latter is the major product.

In the laboratory, naphthoquinone can be produced by the oxidation of a variety of naphthalene compounds. An inexpensive route involves oxidation of naphthalene with chromium trioxide.

== Reactions ==
1,4-Naphthoquinone acts as strong dienophile in Diels-Alder reaction. Its adduct with 1,3-butadiene can be prepared by two methods: 1) long (45 days) exposure of naphthoquinone in neat liquid butadiene taken in huge excess at room temperature in a thick-wall glass tube or 2) fast catalyzed cycloaddition at low temperature in the presence of 1 equivalent of tin(IV) chloride:

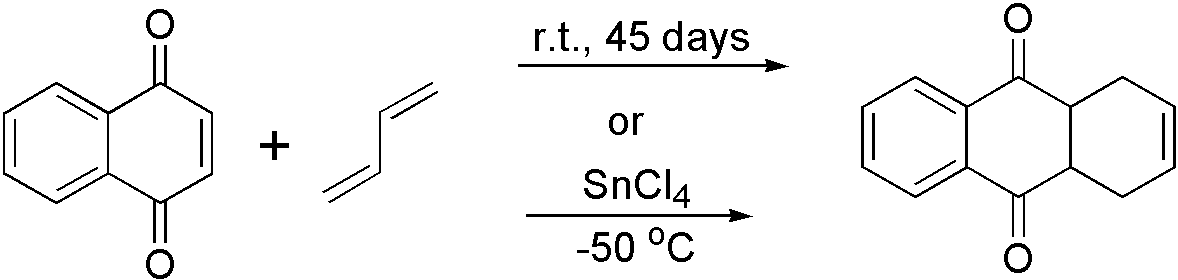
Diels-Alder reaction of 1,4-naphthoquinone with 1,3-butadiene

Reduction of 1,4-naphthoquinone with dithionite gives 1,4-dihydroxynaphthalene. The reaction is reversible: oxidation of the diol give back the quinone.

== Uses ==
1,4-Naphthoquinone is mainly used as a precursor to anthraquinone by reaction with butadiene followed by oxidation. Nitration gives 5-nitro-1,4-naphthalenedione, precursor to an aminoanthroquinone that is used as a dye precursor.

Naphthoquinone functions as a ligand through its electrophilic carbon-carbon double bonds.

== Derivatives ==
Naphthoquinone forms the central chemical structure of many natural compounds, most notably the K vitamins. 2-Methyl-1,4-naphthoquinone, called menadione, is a more effective coagulant than vitamin K. Some naphthoquinone derivatives are cytotoxic, they have significant antibacterial, antifungal, antiviral, insecticidal, anti-inflammatory, and antipyretic properties. Plants with naphthoquinone content are widely used in China and the countries of South America, where they are used to treat malignant and parasitic diseases.

=== Natural 1,4-naphthoquinones ===
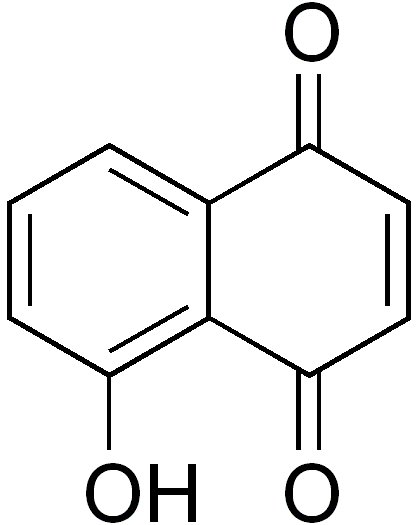
Chemical structure of juglone, a compound produced by black walnut trees.

- Alkannin, commercial red-brown dye from Alkanna tinctoria
- Dichlone, a chlorinated derivative of 1,4-naphthoquinone, a fungicide.
- Droserone, found in plants of the genus Plumbago
- Hexahydroxy-1,4-naphthalenedione
- Juglone, growth-stunting exudate of black walnut trees
- Lapachol, yellow irritant from lapacho tree
- Lawsone, dye in henna
- Menatetrenone, a polyhydroxylated 1,4-naphthoquinone found in some sea urchins
- 2-Methoxy-1,4-naphthoquinone, a compound found in Impatiens species
- Nigrosporin B, lightly studied compound found in the fungus Nigrospora sp
- Plumbagin, yellow toxin found in plants of the genus Plumbago
- Spinochrome B, a marine pigment
- Spinochrome D, a marine pigment
- Vitamin K and related compounds
  - Phylloquinone
  - Vitamin K2
  - Menadione (2-Methyl-1,4-naphthoquinone)
- Naphthazarin, red solid that occurs naturally and is earily prepared

=== Synthetic 1,4-naphthoquinones ===
- Atovaquone, a drug
- Buparvaquone, an antiprotozoal drug used in veterinary medicine

== See also ==
- Hydroxynaphthoquinone
- 1,4-Benzoquinone
- Hooker reaction
