= C10H6O8 =

The molecular formula C_{10}H_{6}O_{8} may refer to:

- Hexahydroxy-1,4-naphthalenedione (spinochrome E)
- Hexahydroxy-1,2-naphthalenedione
- Hexahydroxy-2,3-naphthalenedione
- Hexahydroxy-2,6-naphthalenedione
- Pyromellitic acid
