= Homoisoflavonoid =

Type of phenolic compound

Chemical structure of the 3,4-dihydroxyhomoisoflavan sappanol

Homoisoflavonoids (3-benzylidenechroman-4-ones) are a class of naturally occurring phenols that can be isolated from plants.

Chemically, they have the general structure of a 16-carbon skeleton, which consists of two phenyl rings (A and B) and heterocyclic ring (C).

== Synthesis ==
Homoisoflavones can be synthesized from 2'-hydroxydihydrochalcones.

Homoisoflavanones can be synthesized from 3,5-methoxy phenols via chroman-4-one in three steps or from phloroglucinol.

Conversion

Homoisoflavanes can be obtained from the conversion of homoisoflavonoids.

== Natural occurrences ==
The homoisoflavonoids portulacanones A, B, C and D can be found in Portulaca oleracea (common purslane, Caryophyllales, Portulacaceae).

The 3,4-dihydroxyhomoisoflavans sappanol, episappanol, 3'-deoxysappanol, 3'-O-methylsappanol and 3'-O-methylepisappanol can be found in Caesalpinia sappan.

The homoisoflavones scillavones A and B can be isolated from the bulbs of Scilla scilloides (Barnardia japonica).

=== Homoisoflavanones ===
Chemical structure of sappanone A

Homoisoflavanones (3-Benzyl-4-chromanones) can be found in various plants, notably in members of the Scilloideae.

Sappanone A can be found in Caesalpinia sappan.

C-Methylated homoisoflavanones (3-(4'-methoxy-benzyl)-5,7-dihydroxy-6-methyl-8-methoxy-chroman-4-one, 3-(4'-methoxy-benzyl)-5,7-dihydroxy-6,8-dimethyl-chroman-4-one, 3-(4'-hydroxy-benzyl)-5,7-dihydroxy-6,8-dimethyl-chroman-4-one, 3-(4'-hydroxy-benzyl)-5,7-dihydroxy-6-methyl-8-methoxy-chroman-4-one and 3-(4'-hydroxy-benzyl)-5,7-dihydroxy-6-methyl-chroman-4-one) can be found in the rhizomes of Polygonum odoratum.

5,7-Dihydroxy-3-(3-hydroxy-4-methoxybenzyl)-chroman-4-one, a homoisoflavanone extracted from Cremastra appendiculata (Orchidaceae), has anti-angiogenic activities and inhibits UVB-induced skin inflammation through reduced cyclooxygenase-2 expression and NF-?B nuclear localization.

==== In Asparagaceae ====
3-(4'-Methoxybenzyl)-7,8-methylenedioxy-chroman-4-one, a homoisoflavanone with antimycobacterial activity, can be isolated from Chlorophytum inornatum (Asparagaceae, Agavoideae).

5,7-Dihydroxy-3-(4-methoxybenzyl)-chroman-4-one, 7-hydroxy-3-(4-hydroxybenzyl)-chroman-4-one and 4'-demethyl-3,9-dihydro-punctatin can be isolated from Agave tequilana (Asparagaceae, Agavoideae).

in Scilloideae (formerly Hyacinthaceae)

7-O-α-Rhamnopyranosyl-(1→6)-β-glucopiranosyl-5-hydroxy-3-(4-methoxybenzyl)-chroman-4-one, 7-O-α-rhamnopyranosyl-(1→6)-β-glucopiranosyl-5-hydroxy-3-(4′-hydroxybenzyl)-chroman-4-one, 5,7-dihydroxy-3-(4′-methoxybenzyl)-chroman-4-one (3,9-dihidroeucomin), 5,7-dihydroxy-6-methoxy-3-(4′-methoxybenzyl)-chroman-4-one, 5,7-dihydroxy 3-(4′-hydroxybenzyl)-chroman-4-one (4,4'-demethyl-3,9-dihydropuctatin), 5,7-dihydroxy-3-(4′-hydroxybenzyl)-6-methoxy-chroman-4-one (3,9-dihydroeucomnalin) and 7-hydroxy-3-(4′-hydroxybenzyl)-5-methoxy-chroman-4-one can be isolated from the bulbs of Ledebouria - a genus of plants plant widely used traditional African medicine.

The homoisoflavanone glycosides (-)-7-O-methyleucomol 5-O-beta-D-glucopyranoside, (-)-7-O-methyleucomol 5-O-beta-rutinoside and (-)-7-O-methyleucomol 5-O-beta-neohesperidoside can be isolated from the bulbs of Ornithogalum caudatum.

Scillascillin-type homoisoflavanones (3-hydroxy-type homoisoflavonoids) can be isolated from Drimiopsis maculata.

Eucomin, eucomol, (E)-7-O-methyl-eucomin, (—)-7-O-methyleucomol, (+)-3,9-dihydro-eucomin and 7-O-methyl-3,9-dihydro-eucomin can be isolated from the bulbs of Eucomis bicolor. 4'-o-Methyl-punctatin, autumnalin and 3,9-dihydro-autumnalin can be found in Eucomis autumnalis.

Five homoisoflavanones, 3,5-dihydroxy-7,8-dimethoxy-3-(3',4'-dimethoxybenzyl)-4-chromanone, 3,5-dihydroxy-7-methoxy-3-(3',4'-dimethoxybenzyl)-4-chromanone, 3,5-dihydroxy-7,8-dimethoxy-3-(3'-hydroxy-4'-methoxybenzyl)-4-chromanone, 3,5,6-trihydroxy-7-methoxy-3-(3'-hydroxy-4'-methoxybenzyl)-4-chromanone and 3,5,7-trihydroxy-3-(3'-hydroxy-4'methoxybenzyl)-4-chromanone, can be isolated from the dichloromethane extract of the bulbs of Pseudoprospero firmifolium.

A homoisoflavanone can also be found in Albuca fastigiata.

The same molecule, 5,6-dimethoxy-7-hydroxy-3-(4′-hydroxybenzyl)-4-chromanone, can be found in the bulbs of Resnova humifusa and Eucomis montana.

== Uses ==
The homoisoflavonoids portulacanones A, B, C and D show in vitro cytotoxic activities towards four human cancer cell lines.

== See also ==
- Flavonoids and isoflavonoids, related chemicals with a 15-carbon skeleton
