= Streptomyces aculeolatus =

Scientific classification
- Domain: Bacteria
- Kingdom: Bacillati
- Phylum: Actinomycetota
- Class: Actinomycetia
- Order: Streptomycetales
- Family: Streptomycetaceae
- Genus: Streptomyces
- Species: S. aculeolatus

Binomial name
- Streptomyces aculeolatus Shomura et al. 1988

Type strain
- BCRC 16846, CCRC 16846, CGMCC 4.1907, DSM 41644, IFO 14642, IFO 14824, JCM 6055, KCTC 9680, LMG 19906, NBRC 14642, NBRC 14824, NRRL B-24312, SF 2415

Species of bacterium

Streptomyces aculeolatus is a bacterium species from the genus of Streptomyces which has been isolated from soil from the Tottori prefecture in Japan. Streptomyces aculeolatus produces naphthablin.

== See also ==
- List of Streptomyces species
