= Spinochrome D =

- Skeletal formula

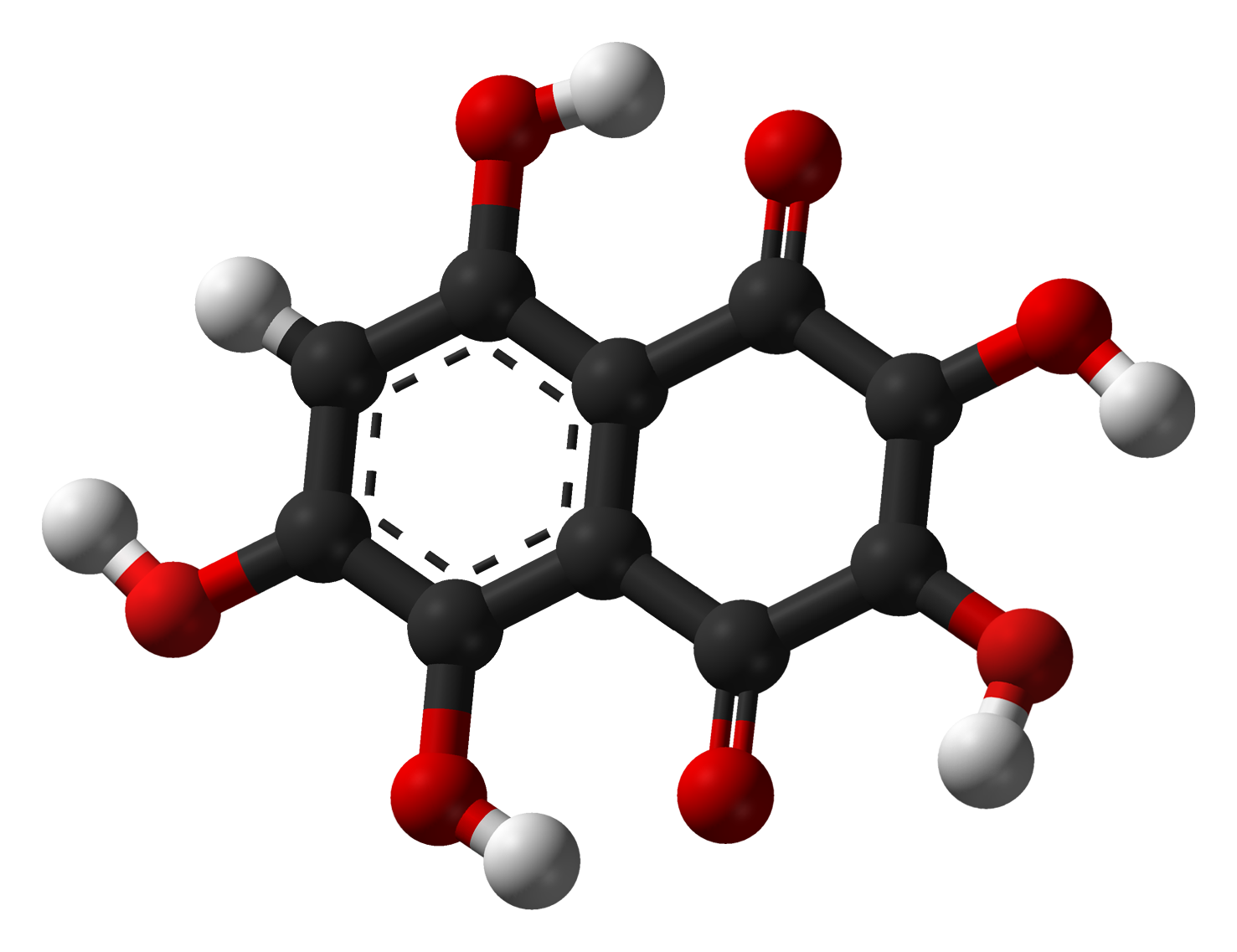
- Ball-and-stick model

Names
- Preferred IUPAC name 2,3,5,6,8-Pentahydroxynaphthalene-1,4-dione

Identifiers
CAS Number	1143-11-9
3D model (JSmol)	Interactive image; Interactive image
ChEMBL	ChEMBL452666
ChemSpider	10287017
PubChem CID	139033598
UNII	N7SYH8K2SN
CompTox Dashboard (EPA)	DTXSID601029285
- InChI: InChI=1S/C10H6O7/c11-2-1-3(12)6(13)5-4(2)7(14)9(16)10(17)8(5)15/h1,11-13,16-17H Key: HYVDWYISUNRFCU-UHFFFAOYSA-N; InChI=1/C10H6O7/c11-2-1-3(12)6(13)5-4(2)7(14)9(16)10(17)8(5)15/h1,11-13,16-17H Key: HYVDWYISUNRFCU-UHFFFAOYAZ
- SMILES: O=C(C1=C2C(O)=C(O)C(O)=C1O)C(O)=CC2=O; Oc1c(O)cc(O)c2C(=O)C(\O)=C(\O)C(=O)c12

Properties
Chemical formula	C_{10}H_{6}O_{7}
Molar mass	238.151 g·mol^{−1}
- Except where otherwise noted, data are given for materials in their standard state (at 25 °C [77 °F], 100 kPa). verify (what is ?) Infobox references

Spinochrome D (2,3,5,6,8-pentahydroxy-1,4-naphthoquinone) is an organic compound with formula C_{10}H_{6}O_{5}, formally derived from 1,4-naphthoquinone through the replacement of five hydrogen atoms by hydroxyl (OH) groups.

Spinochrome D occurs naturally as a brownish red pigment in the shell and spines of sea urchins such as the Japanese aka-uni (Pseudocentrotus depressus). It is soluble in diethyl ether and crystallizes as brownish red needles that sublime at 285−295 °C.

The compound gives a yellowish brown solution when treated with sodium hydroxide, a bluish green solution with ferric chloride, and a violet precipitate with lead acetate. It forms a five-fold acetate ester, C_{10}HO_{2}(CH_{3}COO)_{5}, that crystallizes from methanol as yellow needles that melt at 185−186 °C.

== See also ==
- Spinochrome B
- Spinochrome E
