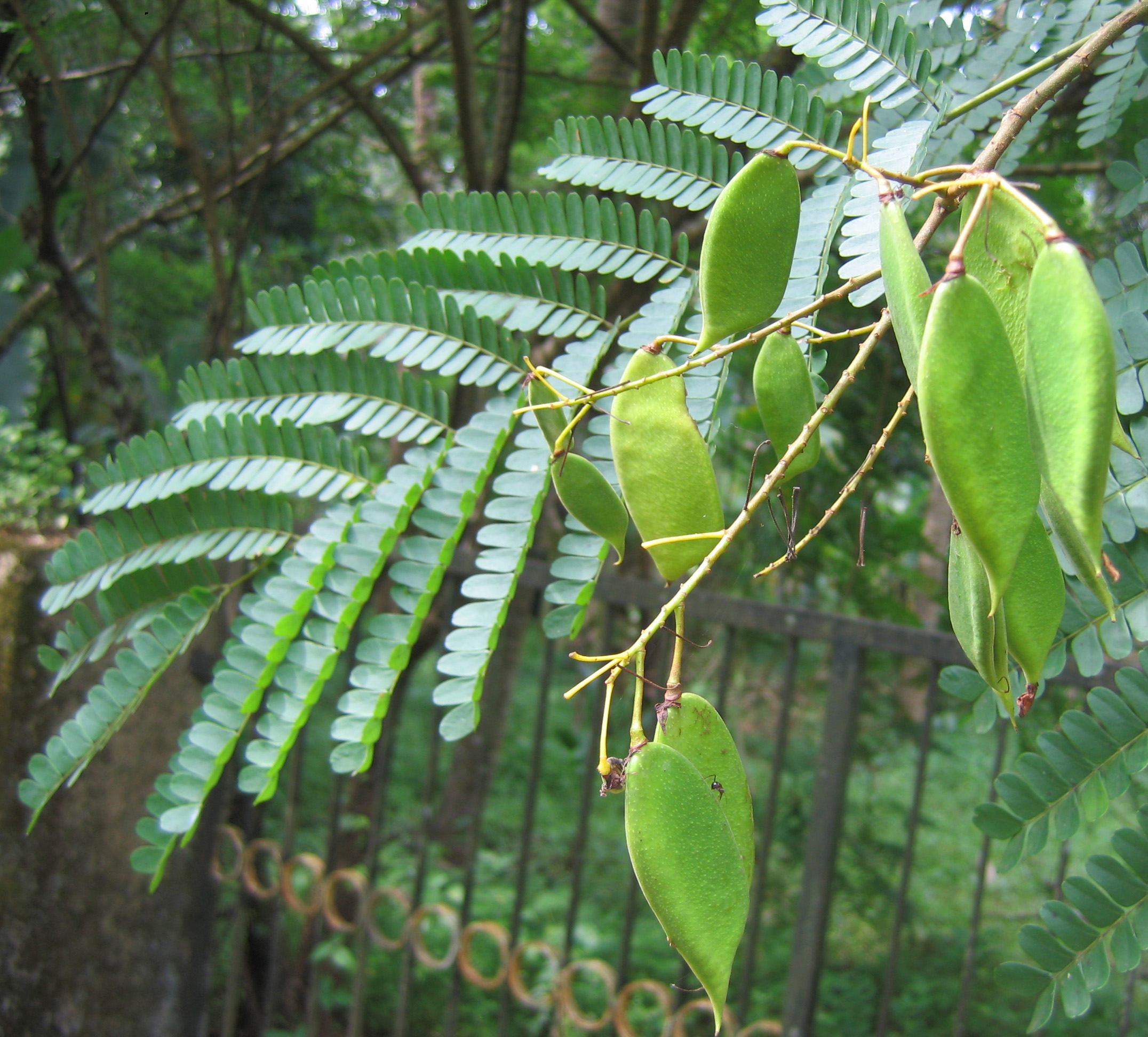
- Leaves and fruits

Conservation status
- Least Concern (IUCN 2.3)

Scientific classification
- Kingdom: Plantae
- Clade: Tracheophytes
- Clade: Angiosperms
- Clade: Eudicots
- Clade: Rosids
- Order: Fabales
- Family: Fabaceae
- Subfamily: Caesalpinioideae
- Genus: Biancaea
- Species: B. sappan

Binomial name
- Biancaea sappan (L.) Tod. (1875)

Synonyms
- Caesalpinia angustifolia Salisb. (1796), nom. illeg. superfl.; Caesalpinia sappan L. 1753; Caesalpinia sapang Noronha (1790), orth. var.

= Biancaea sappan =

Species of legume

Biancaea sappan is a species of flowering tree in the legume family, Fabaceae, that is native to tropical Asia. Common names in English include sappan (after Malay sepang), sappanwood and Indian redwood. It was previously ascribed to the genus Caesalpinia. Sappanwood is related to brazilwood (Paubrasilia echinata), and was itself called brasilwood in the Middle Ages.

It is native to Nepal and the eastern Himalayas, northeastern India, Bangladesh, and Indochina. It has been introduced to much of the Indian Subcontinent, southern China, Malesia, Papuasia, and parts of tropical Africa.

The species was first described as Caesalpinia sappan by Carl Linnaeus in 1753. In 1875 Agostino Todaro placed the species in genus Biancaea as B. sappan.

Biancaea sappan can be infected by twig dieback (Lasiodiplodia theobromae).

== Uses ==
Its thorniness is utilised as fencing material.

=== Pigment ===
This plant has many uses. It has antibacterial and anticoagulant properties. It also produces a valuable reddish dye called brazilin, used for dyeing fabric as well as making red paints and inks. (Note: "From the Yoshimua Dye-works archive, we have learned that in 1845, the expensive safflower red was subsitituted or diluted with sappan (Caesalpinia sappan L.) and turmeric (Curcuma longa L.).") Slivers of heartwood are used for making herbal drinking water in various regions, such as Kerala, Karnataka and Central Java, where it is usually mixed with ginger, cinnamon, and cloves. The heartwood also contains juglone (5-hydroxy-1,4-naphthoquinone), which has antimicrobial activity. Homoisoflavonoids (sappanol, episappanol, 3'-deoxysappanol, 3'-O-methylsappanol, 3'-O-methylepisappanol and sappanone A) can also be found in B. sappan.

=== Wood ===
The wood is somewhat lighter in color than brazilwood and other related trees. Sappanwood was a major trade good as shipbuilding material and dunnage during the 17th century, when it was exported from Southeast Asia (especially regions of Sumbawa south of the Flores Sea, and Siam) aboard red seal ships to Japan; Siamese sappan grown in rainier climates than Sumbawa were thicker thus regarded of higher quality. Siamese sappan trade significantly dropped by 1664 following trade deals between the Dutch East India Company and the Bima Sultanate in 166, which the former party paid with one Spanish real per picul; though payment could be substituted with linen, firearms or lead in exchange.

== Gallery ==
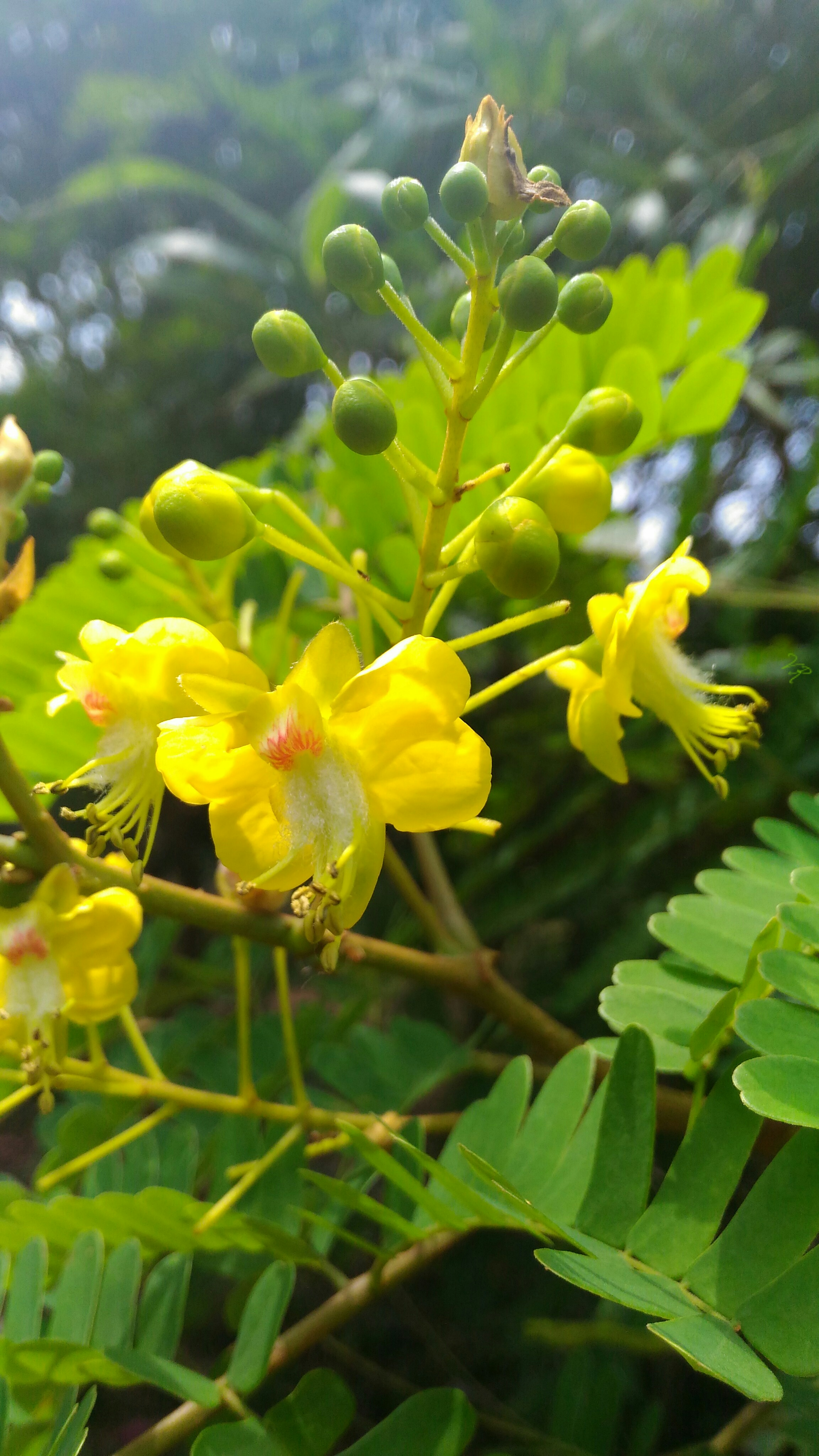
Leaves, flower buds

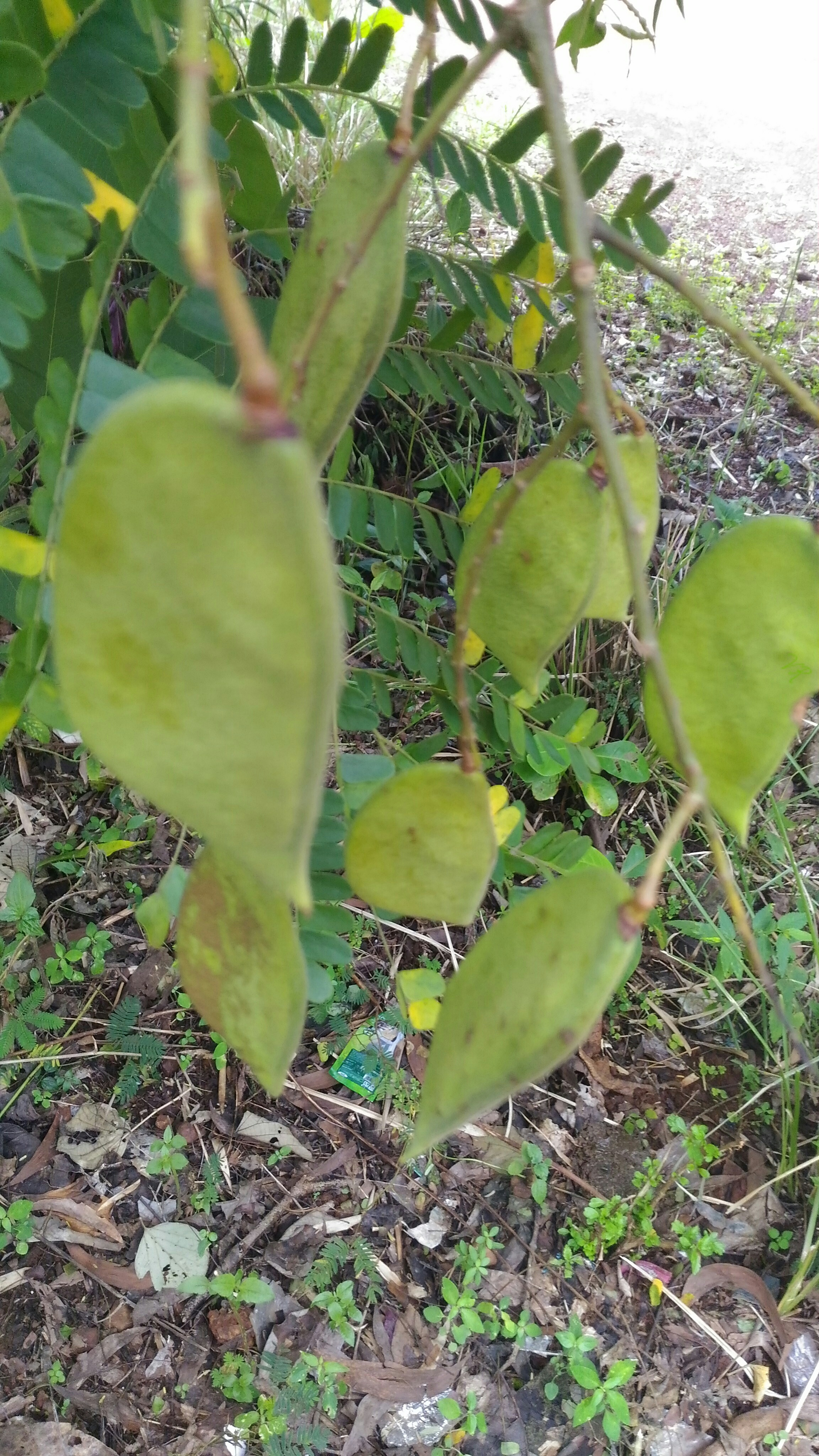
Fruits

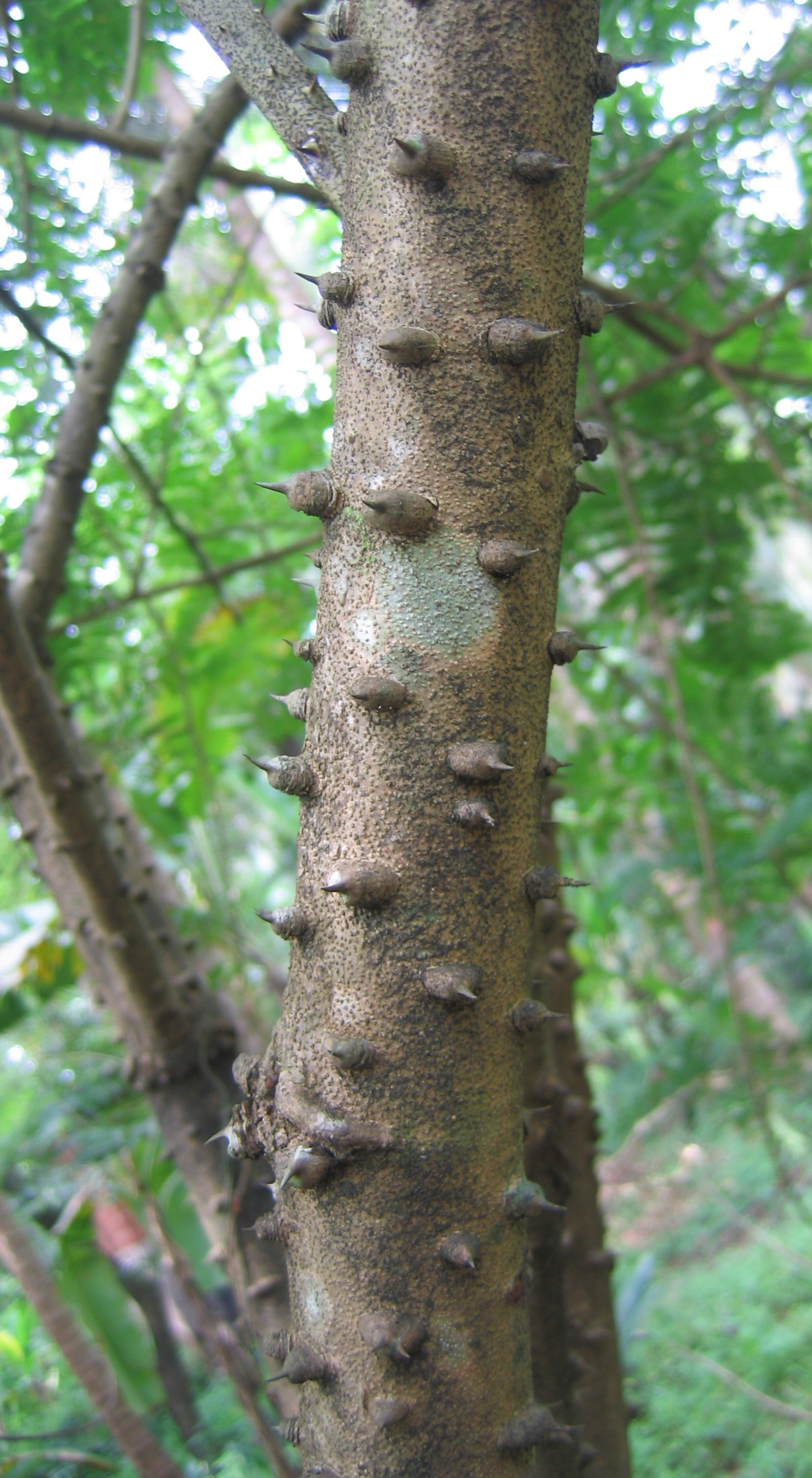
Bark

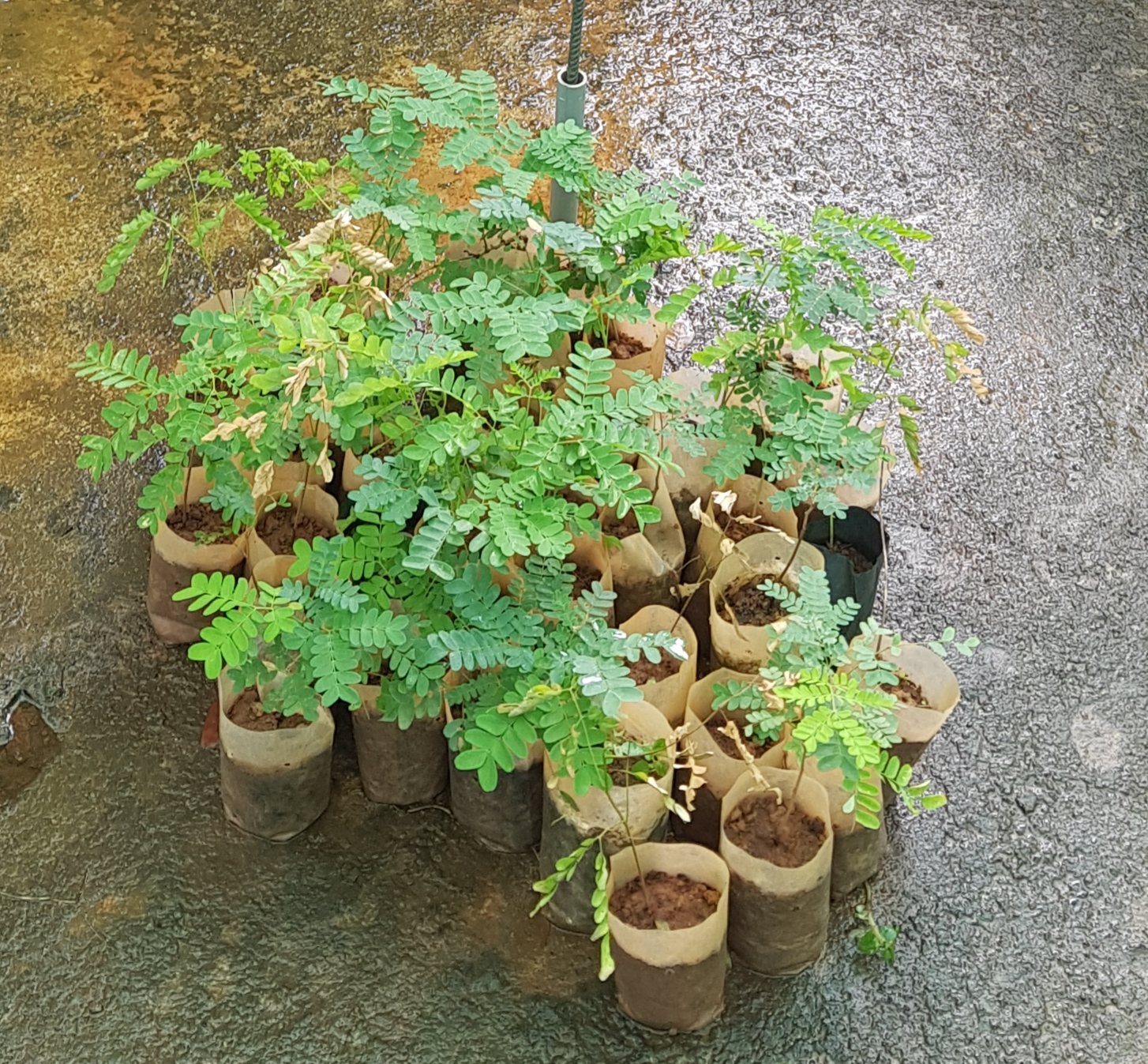
Plantlings
