= NIH shift =

An NIH shift is a chemical rearrangement where a hydrogen atom on an aromatic ring undergoes an intramolecular migration primarily during a hydroxylation reaction. This process is also known as a 1,2-hydride shift. These shifts are often studied and observed by isotopic labeling. An example of an NIH shift is shown below:

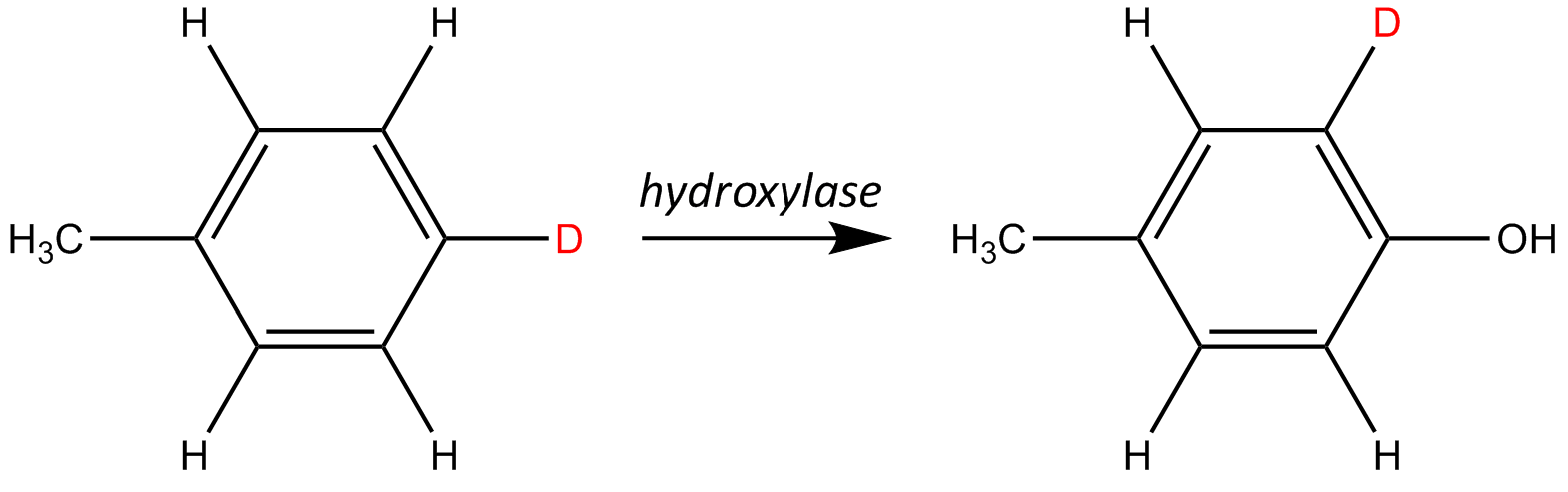
Example of NIH shift

In this example, a hydrogen atom has been isotopically labeled using deuterium (shown in red). The process proceeds via an arene oxide, which rearrange to give the diene-ketone via the NIH shift. This is the initial step in the detoxification of benzene by cytochrome P450.

Several hydroxylase enzymes are believed to incorporate an NIH shift in their mechanism, including 4-hydroxyphenylpyruvate dioxygenase and the tetrahydrobiopterin dependent hydroxylases. The name NIH shift arises from the US National Institutes of Health from where studies first reported observing this transformation.
