= Scillavone A =

Names
- Preferred IUPAC name (3R)-1′,5,7-Trihydroxy-2′,3′-dimethoxy-2H,4H-spiro[[1]benzopyran-3,6′-bicyclo[4.2.0]octane]-1′(8′),2′,4′-trien-4-one
- Other names (+)-Scillavone A

Identifiers
CAS Number	1105670-99-2
3D model (JSmol)	Interactive image
ChemSpider	32077066
PubChem CID	101863378
UNII	3WU25FF7WX
CompTox Dashboard (EPA)	DTXSID601317854
- InChI: InChI=1S/C18H16O7/c1-23-13-5-10-9(15(21)16(13)24-2)6-18(10)7-25-12-4-8(19)3-11(20)14(12)17(18)22/h3-5,19-21H,6-7H2,1-2H3/t18-/m1/s1 Key: DXRXYPLZQXGUBC-GOSISDBHSA-N; InChI=1/C18H16O7/c1-23-13-5-10-9(15(21)16(13)24-2)6-18(10)7-25-12-4-8(19)3-11(20)14(12)17(18)22/h3-5,19-21H,6-7H2,1-2H3/t18-/m1/s1 Key: DXRXYPLZQXGUBC-GOSISDBHBI
- SMILES: COc1cc2c(c(c1OC)O)C[C@@]23COc4cc(cc(c4C3=O)O)O

Properties
Chemical formula	C_{18}H_{16}O_{7}
Molar mass	344.31 g/mol
- Except where otherwise noted, data are given for materials in their standard state (at 25 °C [77 °F], 100 kPa). Infobox references

Scillavone A is a homoisoflavone that can be isolated from the bulbs of Scilla scilloides (Barnardia japonica).
