= Sappanone A =

Names
- IUPAC name [1′a(3)E]-3′,4′,7-Trihydroxy-2H-1′(3)a-homoisoflav-1′a(3)-en-4-one
- Systematic IUPAC name (3E)-3-[(3,4-Dihydroxyphenyl)methylidene]-7-hydroxy-2,3-dihydro-4H-1-benzopyran-4-one

Identifiers
CAS Number	104778-14-5; 102067-84-5 (non-specific); 112458-02-3 (non-specific)
3D model (JSmol)	Interactive image
ChEMBL	ChEMBL249002
ChemSpider	7993024
PubChem CID	9817274
UNII	659E9Z3J5X
- InChI: InChI=1S/C16H12O5/c17-11-2-3-12-15(7-11)21-8-10(16(12)20)5-9-1-4-13(18)14(19)6-9/h1-7,17-19H,8H2/b10-5+ Key: KVYZXXBTJHJISR-BJMVGYQFSA-N
- SMILES: C1/C(=C\C2=CC(=C(C=C2)O)O)/C(=O)C3=C(O1)C=C(C=C3)O

Properties
Chemical formula	C_{16}H_{12}O_{5}
Molar mass	284.267 g·mol^{−1}
- Except where otherwise noted, data are given for materials in their standard state (at 25 °C [77 °F], 100 kPa). Infobox references

Sappanone A is a homoisoflavanone that can be found in Caesalpinia sappan.
