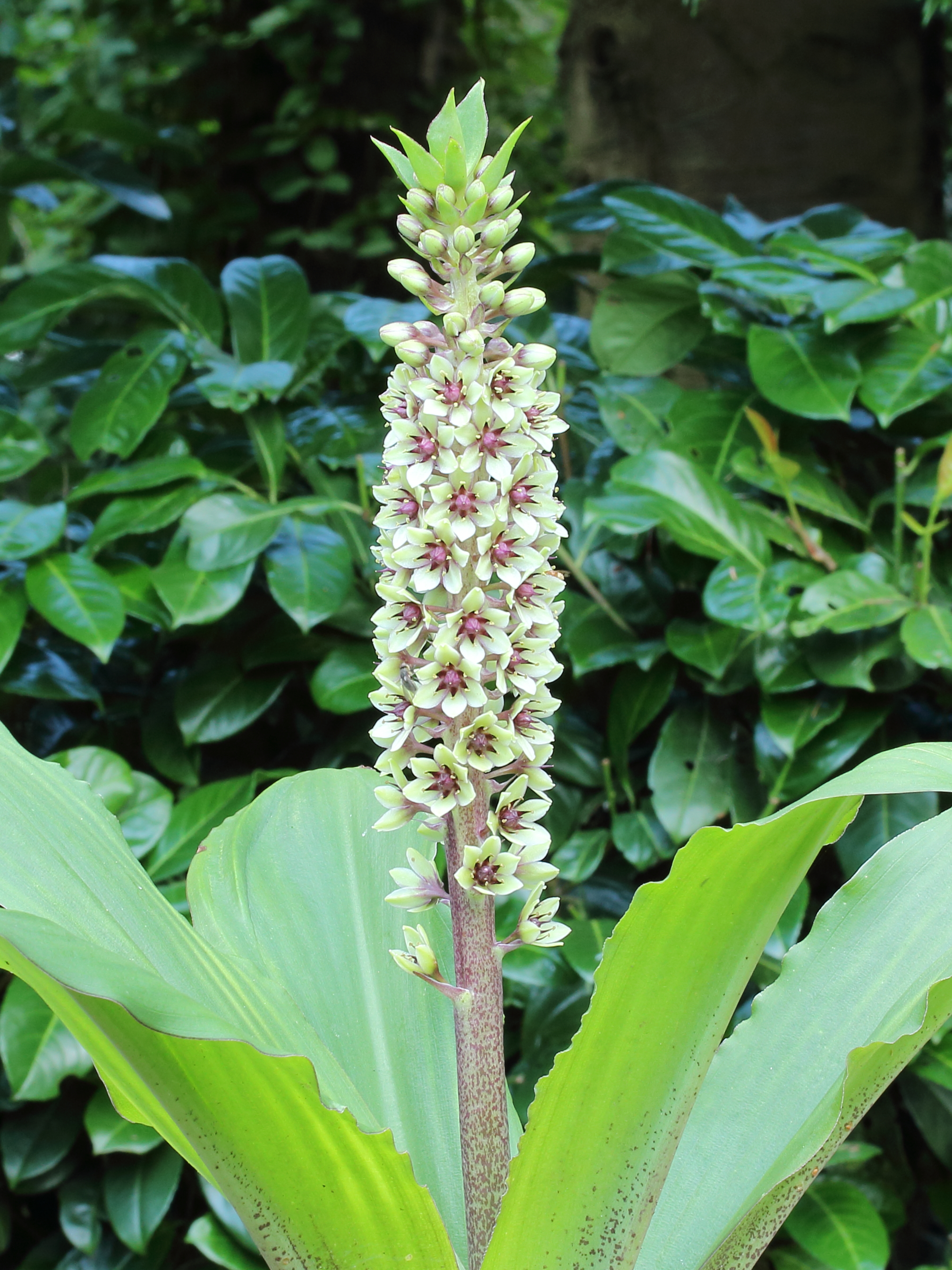
- Flowers

Scientific classification
- Kingdom: Plantae
- Clade: Tracheophytes
- Clade: Angiosperms
- Clade: Monocots
- Order: Asparagales
- Family: Asparagaceae
- Subfamily: Scilloideae
- Genus: Eucomis
- Species: E. montana

Binomial name
- Eucomis montana Compton

= Eucomis montana =

Species of flowering plant

Eucomis montana is a plant species in the family Asparagaceae, subfamily Scilloideae, found in South Africa (KwaZulu-Natal and the Northern Provinces) and Eswatini (Swaziland). When in flower in summer, the plant reaches a height of up to 45 cm (1 ft 6 in), with a dense spike (raceme) of greenish flowers, topped by a "head" of green bracts.

== Description ==
Eucomis montana is a perennial growing from a large ovoid bulb with a diameter of up to 8 cm (3 1/4 in). Like other Eucomis species, it has a basal rosette of strap-shaped leaves. These are about 50 cm (20 in) long and 12 cm (4 1/2 in) wide, with smooth margins and purple spots or speckles underneath. The inflorescence, produced in late summer, is a dense raceme. The plant reaches an overall height of around 25–45 cm (10 in – 1 ft 6 in). The individual flowers have greenish tepals and stamens with purple filaments, and are borne on short stalks (pedicels) 5–10 mm (1/5–2/5 in) long. The inflorescence is topped by a head (coma) of green bracts, up to 5 cm (2 in) long.

The homoisoflavanone 5,6-dimethoxy-7-hydroxy-3-(4′-hydroxybenzyl)-4-chromanone can be found in the bulbs of E. montana.

== Taxonomy ==
Eucomis montana was first described by Robert Harold Compton in 1967, after he retired to Eswatini (then Swaziland) where it was first found. The Latin specific epithet montana refers to mountains or coming from mountains. It is one of a group of larger, tetraploid species with 2n = 4x = 60 chromosomes.

== Distribution and habitat ==
Eucomis montana was initially discovered in Eswatini, where it grew in colonies on damp grassland slopes at elevations of 1,500 m (4,900 ft). It has since also been found in South Africa, in KwaZulu-Natal and the Northern Provinces. It grows at elevations of up to 2,080 m (6,820 ft).

== Cultivation ==
As of 2007, it was said to be very rare in cultivation, but should prove to be "at least frost-hardy".
