= Spinochrome B =

- Skeletal formula

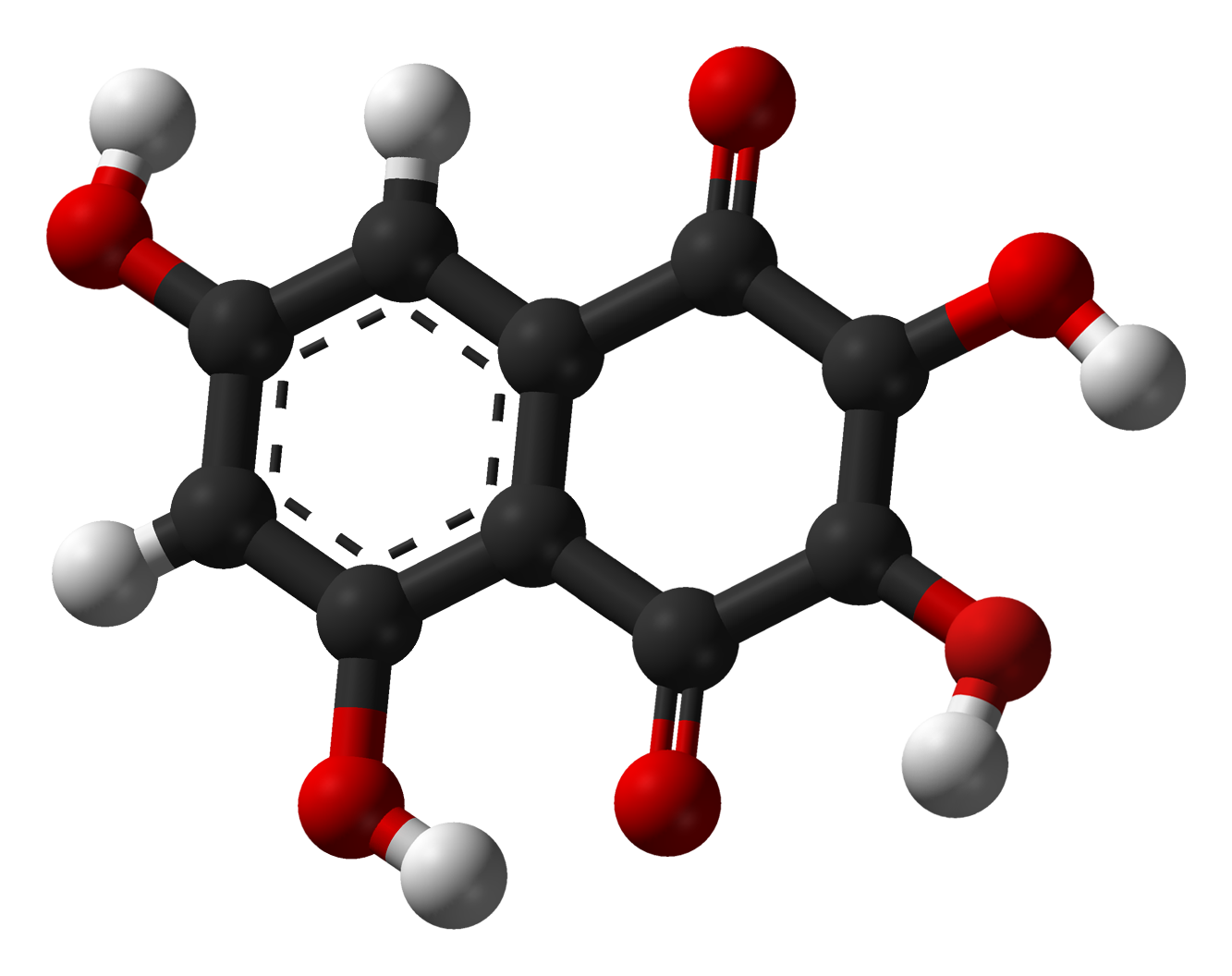
- Ball-and-stick model

Names
- Preferred IUPAC name 2,3,5,7-Tetrahydroxynaphthalene-1,4-dione

Identifiers
CAS Number	604-46-6
3D model (JSmol)	Interactive image; Interactive image
ChemSpider	14617131
PubChem CID	135449020
UNII	8F4EG354EB
CompTox Dashboard (EPA)	DTXSID30314748
- InChI: InChI=1S/C10H6O6/c11-3-1-4-6(5(12)2-3)8(14)10(16)9(15)7(4)13/h1-2,11-12,15-16H Key: RWRKDUHFUYRCIT-UHFFFAOYSA-N; InChI=1/C10H6O6/c11-3-1-4-6(5(12)2-3)8(14)10(16)9(15)7(4)13/h1-2,11-12,15-16H Key: RWRKDUHFUYRCIT-UHFFFAOYAA
- SMILES: O=C(C1=C2C(O)=CC(O)=C1)C(O)=C(O)C2=O; Oc1cc(O)c2c(c1)C(=O)C(\O)=C(\O)C2=O

Properties
Chemical formula	C_{10}H_{6}O_{6}
Molar mass	222.15 g/mol
- Except where otherwise noted, data are given for materials in their standard state (at 25 °C [77 °F], 100 kPa). verify (what is ?) Infobox references

Spinochrome B (2,3,5,7-tetrahydroxynaphthoquinone) is an organic compound with formula C_{10}H_{6}O_{4}, formally derived from 1,4-naphthoquinone through the replacement of four hydrogen atoms by hydroxyl (OH) groups.

Spinochrome B occurs naturally as pigment in the shell and spines of sea urchins such as the Japanese dull red species aka-uni (Pseudocentrotus depressus), the greenish-black murasaki-uni (Heliocidaris crassispina), and the brown bafun-uni (Strongylocentrotus pulcherrimus). It is soluble in methanol and crystallizes as bright red needles that sublime above 200 °C.

The compound gives a greenish yellow solution when treated with sodium hydroxide, a green solution with ferric chloride, and a green precipitate with lead acetate. It forms a fourfold acetate ester, C_{10}H_{2}O_{2}(CH_{3}COO)_{4}, that crystallizes from methanol as yellow needles that melt at 157 °C.

== See also ==
- Spinochrome D
- Spinochrome E
