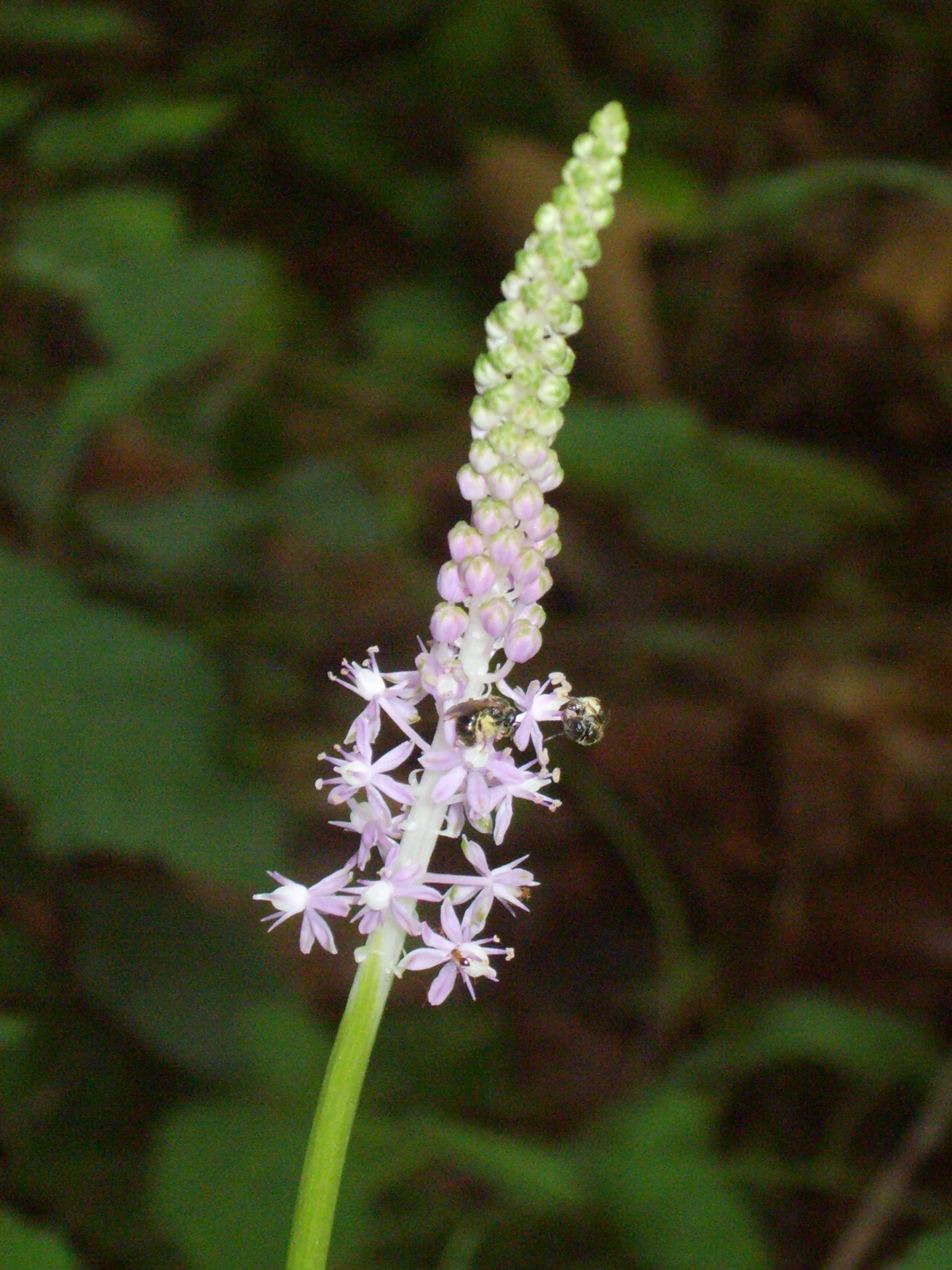
- Barnardia japonica

Scientific classification
- Kingdom: Plantae
- Clade: Tracheophytes
- Clade: Angiosperms
- Clade: Monocots
- Order: Asparagales
- Family: Asparagaceae
- Subfamily: Scilloideae
- Genus: Barnardia; Lindl.

= Barnardia =

Genus of flowering plants

Barnardia is a small genus of bulbous flowering plants in the family Asparagaceae, subfamily Scilloideae (also treated as the family Hyacinthaceae). The genus has two species, one found in the Balearic Islands and north-west Africa, the other in east China, Korea, Japan and adjacent localities. It was suggested in 2012 that the two species were not closely related.

== Description ==
Plants of Barnardia grow from bulbs. The flowers appear in the autumn and are borne in a dense raceme containing small narrow bracts. Individual flowers are star-shaped, small, and with pink or more rarely white tepals. The filaments of the stamens are widened at the base. The elongated seeds are dark brown in colour.

== Systematics ==
The genus Barnardia was created by John Lindley in 1826 together with the single species B. scilloides. However, this species had already been described as Ornithogalum japonicum by Carl Peter Thunberg in 1784, so that it is now called B. japonica. The genus name honours Edward Barnard.

Barnardia is placed in the tribe Hyacintheae, subtribe Hyacinthinae (or the subfamily Hyacinthoideae, tribe Hyacintheae, by those who accept the family Hyacinthaceae). The genus (represented by B. japonica) occupied a basal position in the Hyacinthinae in a 1999 molecular phylogenetic analysis, suggesting an early evolutionary origin.

=== Species ===
As of May 2026, the World Checklist of Selected Plant Families recognized two species:

- Barnardia japonica (Thunb.) Schult. & Schult.f. (syns Ornithogalum japonicum Thunb.; B. scilloides Lindl., B. sinensis (Lour.) Speta; Scilla chinensis Benth., nom. illeg., S. japonica Baker, nom. illeg., S. sinensis (Lour.) Merr, S. scilloides (Lindl.) Druce)

From eastern Asia (China, Japan, Korea, Taiwan, and Russia around Vladivostok)

- Barnardia numidica (Poir.) Speta (syns Scilla numidica Poir., S. parviflora Desf., nom. illeg.)

From the Balearic Islands and north-west Africa (Algeria, Tunisia, Libya)

Ali et al. (2012) suggest that B. numidica is not related to B. japonica and should be transferred to a genus of its own.

== Cultivation ==
Barnardia japonica is cultivated as an ornamental bulb, sometimes under one of its synonyms, such as Scilla scilloides. In a temperate climate it requires a sunny position where it flowers in the autumn. As well as the normal pink-flowered form, a white form is in cultivation.
