= Arene oxide =

Benzene is oxidized by the enzyme Cytochrome P450 to benzene oxide.

In chemistry, an arene oxide is an epoxide of an arene. Two important families of arene oxides are benzene oxides and naphthalene oxides as these are intermediates in the oxidative degradation of benzene and naphthalene, two common pollutants. Benzopyrene is also converted to an epoxide, (+)-benzo[a]pyrene-7,8-epoxide.

== Selected reactions ==
=== Benzene oxide ===
Benzene oxide (C_{6}H_{6}O) exists as an equilibrium mixture with the seven-membered ring oxepin, which has three double bonds. The arene oxide and oxepin are valence isomers. The equilibrium proceeds via disrotatory 6π ring closing and opening.

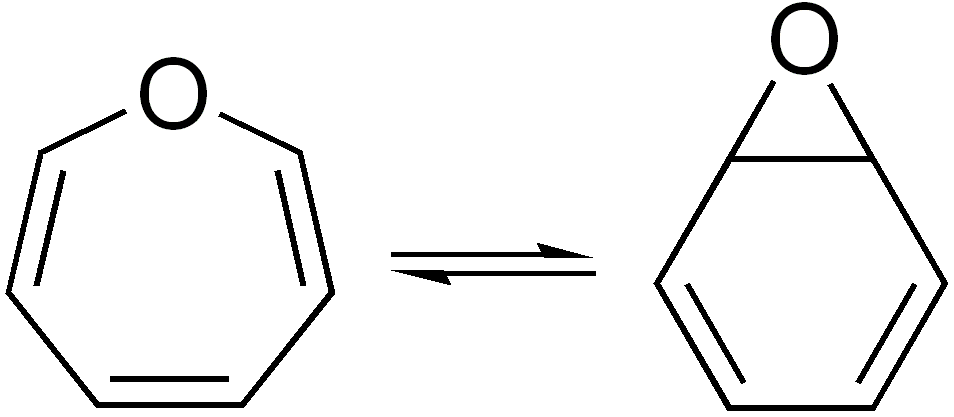
Oxepin-benzene oxide

The arene oxide can rearrange to give the diene-ketone via the NIH shift. This process is the initial step in the detoxification of benzene by the cytochrome P450.

Benzene oxide can also hydrate to give dihydroxydihydrobenzene. The hydration is catalyzed by epoxide hydrolase enzymes. Dehydration of this diols, which is driven by rearomatization, gives phenol.

=== Naphthalene derivatives ===
Naphthalene-1,2-oxide forms from naphthalene. It hydrates to give 1,2-dihydroxydihydronaphthalene. The hydration is again catalyzed by epoxide hydrolase enzymes. Dehydration of this diol gives 1-naphthol. Oxidation of 1,2-dihydroxydihydronaphthalene, catalyzed by dihydrodiol dehydrogenase, gives the 1,2-naphthoquinone. The oxide derived from 1-naphthol results in 1,4-naphthoquinone. These conversions are relevant to the biodegradation of naphthalenes.
