= Scillavone B =

Names
- IUPAC name (3S)-3′,4′,5-Trihydroxy-6,7-dimethoxy-1′(3)a-homoisoflavan-4-one
- Systematic IUPAC name (3S)-3-[(3,4-Dihydroxyphenyl)methyl]-5-hydroxy-6,7-dimethoxy-4H-1-benzopyran-4-one

Identifiers
CAS Number	1105671-01-9
3D model (JSmol)	Interactive image
ChemSpider	32077067
PubChem CID	91365537
UNII	GMT9EZY9E2
CompTox Dashboard (EPA)	DTXSID901031879
- InChI: InChI=1S/C18H18O7/c1-23-14-7-13-15(17(22)18(14)24-2)16(21)10(8-25-13)5-9-3-4-11(19)12(20)6-9/h3-4,6-7,10,19-20,22H,5,8H2,1-2H3/t10-/m0/s1 Key: IWDPSYVRXCJSRF-JTQLQIEISA-N
- SMILES: COc1cc2c(c(c1OC)O)C(=O)[C@H](CO2)Cc3ccc(c(c3)O)O

Properties
Chemical formula	C_{18}H_{18}O_{7}
Molar mass	346.33 g/mol
- Except where otherwise noted, data are given for materials in their standard state (at 25 °C [77 °F], 100 kPa). Infobox references

Scillavone B is a homoisoflavone that can be isolated from the bulbs of Scilla scilloides (Barnardia japonica).
