= Nigrosporin B =

Names
- Preferred IUPAC name (6R,7S)-6,7,10-Trihydroxy-2-methoxy-7-methyl-5,6,7,8-tetrahydroanthracene-1,4-dione

Identifiers
CAS Number	200716-12-7
3D model (JSmol)	Interactive image
ChEMBL	ChEMBL1224809
ChemSpider	8442489
PubChem CID	10267010
CompTox Dashboard (EPA)	DTXSID201045433
- InChI: InChI=1S/C16H16O6/c1-16(21)6-7-3-9-13(15(20)8(7)4-12(16)18)10(17)5-11(22-2)14(9)19/h3,5,12,18,20-21H,4,6H2,1-2H3/t12-,16+/m1/s1 Key: QNFWEYHUDXOXHJ-WBMJQRKESA-N; InChI=1/C16H16O6/c1-16(21)6-7-3-9-13(15(20)8(7)4-12(16)18)10(17)5-11(22-2)14(9)19/h3,5,12,18,20-21H,4,6H2,1-2H3/t12-,16+/m1/s1 Key: QNFWEYHUDXOXHJ-WBMJQRKEBZ
- SMILES: C[C@@]1(CC2=C(C[C@H]1O)C(=C3C(=C2)C(=O)C(=CC3=O)OC)O)O

Properties
Chemical formula	C_{16}H_{16}O_{6}
Molar mass	304.298 g·mol^{−1}
- Except where otherwise noted, data are given for materials in their standard state (at 25 °C [77 °F], 100 kPa). Infobox references

Nigrosporin B is a naphthoquinone isolate of the fungus Nigrospora. Nigrosporin B has anti-mycobacterial activity.
