= 3-Benzoxepin =

Names
- Preferred IUPAC name 3-Benzoxepine

Identifiers
CAS Number	264-13-1
3D model (JSmol)	Interactive image
ChemSpider	2892804
PubChem CID	3659427
UNII	MWA8J394LK
CompTox Dashboard (EPA)	DTXSID401029265
- InChI: InChI=1S/C10H8O/c1-2-4-10-6-8-11-7-5-9(10)3-1/h1-8H Key: APSZPCTXHHKIQO-UHFFFAOYSA-N
- SMILES: C1=CC=C2C=COC=CC2=C1

Properties
Chemical formula	C_{10}H_{8}O
Molar mass	144.173 g·mol^{−1}
Appearance	Yellow solid
Melting point	84 (83–84 °C; 84 °C)
Solubility	soluble in apolar solvents (diethyl ether, benzene, tetrachloromethane) and alcohols (methanol)
- Except where otherwise noted, data are given for materials in their standard state (at 25 °C [77 °F], 100 kPa). Infobox references

3-Benzoxepin is an annulated ring system with an aromatic benzene ring and a non-aromatic, unsaturated, oxygen-containing seven-membered heterocyclic oxepin. The first synthesis was described by Karl Dimroth and coworkers in 1961. It is one of the three isomers of the benzoxepins.

== Occurrence and synthesis ==
3-Benzoxepin itself is a non-natural compound, but the bicyclic ring system is part of the naturally occurring compounds perilloxin (I) from Perilla frutescens (variant acuta), tenual (II), and tenucarb (III) from Asphodeline tenuior. Perilloxin inhibits the enzyme cyclooxygenase with an IC_{50} of 23.2 μM. Non-steroidal anti-inflammatory drugs like aspirin and ibuprofen also work by inhibiting the cyclooxygenase enzyme family.

Structural formulas of perilloxin, tenual, and tenucarb

Unsubstituted 3-benzoxepin can be synthesized through a double Wittig reaction from o-phthalaldehyde with bis-(α,α′-triphenylphosphonium)-dimethylether-dibromide. The latter compound can be synthesized from α,α′-dibromodimethyl ether (bis(bromomethyl)ether or BBME) which is accessible from hydrobromic acid, paraformaldehyde, and triphenylphosphine. The reaction is performed in dry methanol with sodium methoxide, and the product is obtained in 55% yield.

Synthesis from 3-benzoxepin according to K. Dimroth

The compound can also be obtained through UV-irradiation of certain naphthalene derivatives such as 1,4-epoxy-1,4-dihydronaphthalene.

3-Benzoxepin from UV-irradiation from epoxydihydronaphthaline

It can also be obtained by photooxygenation of 1,4-dihydronaphthalene, followed by pyrolysis of the formed hydroperoxides.

3-Benzoxepin durch Pyrolyse aus Hydroperoxydihydronaphthalen

The latter syntheses give 3-benzoxepins in low yields (4–6%).

== Properties ==
3-Benzoxepin is a bright yellow solid that crystallizes in platelets, with a smell similar to naphthalene. The material is soluble in apolar, organic solvents. Like naphthalene, it can be purified through sublimation. The solid is relatively acid-resistant, only under refluxing in concentrated, acidic alcohol solutions an unsaturated aldehyde is formed (likely an indene-3-aldehyde). Catalytic hydrogenation with a palladium catalyst results in 1,2,4,5-tetrahydro-3-benzoxepin.

Reactions with 3-Benzoxepin
