= Ozopromide =

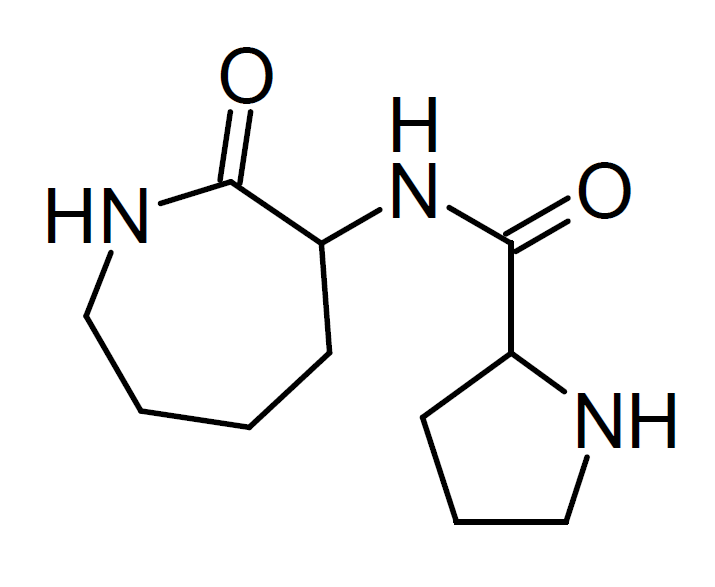

Identifiers
- IUPAC name: N-(2-oxoazepan-3-yl)pyrrolidine-2-carboxamide
- PubChem CID: 43704078

Chemical and physical data
- Formula: C_{11}H_{19}N_{3}O_{2}
- Molar mass: 225.292 g·mol^{−1}
- 3D model (JSmol): Interactive image
- SMILES: C1CCNC(=O)C(C1)NC(=O)C2CCCN2
- InChI: InChI=1S/C11H19N3O2/c15-10-9(4-1-2-6-13-10)14-11(16)8-5-3-7-12-8/h8-9,12H,1-7H2,(H,13,15)(H,14,16); Key:FBGWHFNNNZPNPZ-UHFFFAOYSA-N

Ozopromide (OPC) is a natural product isolated from ink from the common octopus Octopus vulgaris. It has antiinflammatory effects and inhibits the growth of cancer cells in vitro but has not yet been further researched.
