= Naphthazarin =

- Skeletal formula

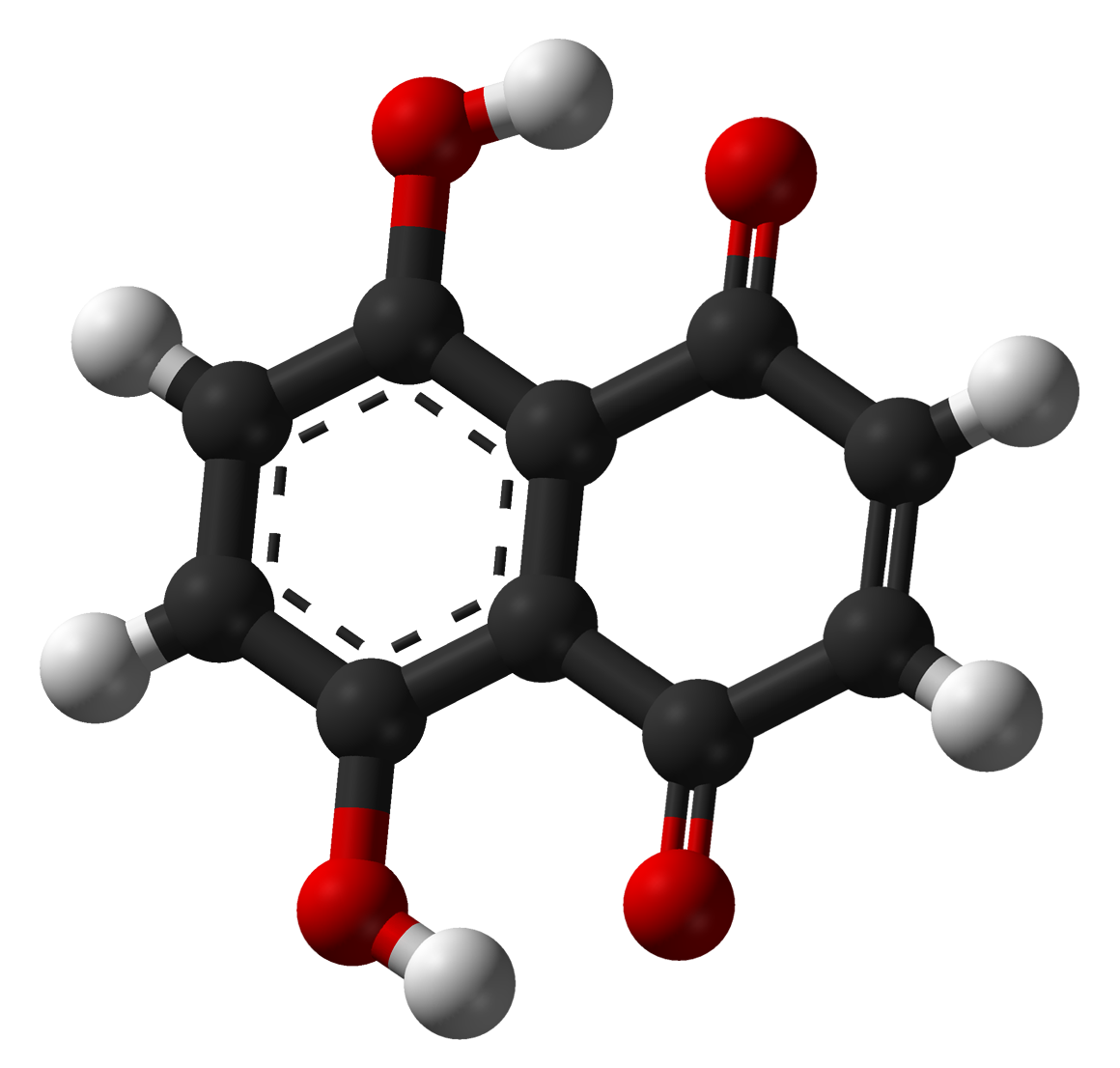
- Ball-and-stick model

Names
- Preferred IUPAC name 5,8-Dihydroxynaphthalene-1,4-dione
- Other names Dihydroxynaphthoquinone

Identifiers
CAS Number	475-38-7
3D model (JSmol)	Interactive image; Interactive image
ChEBI	CHEBI:28849
ChEMBL	ChEMBL274056
ChemSpider	9735
ECHA InfoCard	100.006.816
EC Number	207-495-4
KEGG	C01938
PubChem CID	10141
UNII	S9IX5I5C0K
CompTox Dashboard (EPA)	DTXSID00197161
- InChI: InChI=1S/C10H6O4/c11-5-1-2-6(12)10-8(14)4-3-7(13)9(5)10/h1-4,11-12H Key: RQNVIKXOOKXAJQ-UHFFFAOYSA-N; InChI=1/C10H6O4/c11-5-1-2-6(12)10-8(14)4-3-7(13)9(5)10/h1-4,11-12H Key: RQNVIKXOOKXAJQ-UHFFFAOYAN
- SMILES: C1=CC(=C2C(=O)C=CC(=O)C2=C1O)O; O=C\2c1c(O)ccc(O)c1C(=O)/C=C/2

Properties
Chemical formula	C_{10}H_{6}O_{4}
Molar mass	190.154 g·mol^{−1}
Melting point	228–232 °C (442–450 °F; 501–505 K)

Hazards
- GHS labelling
Pictograms	(GHS07: Exclamation mark)
Signal word	Warning
Hazard statements	H302, H312, H315, H319, H332, H335
Precautionary statements	P261, P264, P270, P271, P280, P301+P312, P302+P352, P304+P312, P304+P340, P305+P351+P338, P312, P321, P322, P330, P332+P313, P337+P313, P362, P363, P403+P233, P405, P501
- Except where otherwise noted, data are given for materials in their standard state (at 25 °C [77 °F], 100 kPa). verify (what is ?) Infobox references

Naphthazarin, often called 5,8-dihydroxy-1,4-naphthoquinone or 5,8-dihydroxy-1,4-naphthalenedione (IUPAC), is a naturally occurring organic compound with formula C_{10}H_{6}O_{4}, formally derived from 1,4-naphthoquinone through replacement of two hydrogen atoms by hydroxyl (OH) groups. It is thus one of many dihydroxynaphthoquinone structural isomers.

Naphthazarin is soluble in 1,4-dioxane from which it crystallizes as deep red needles that melt at 228−232 °C.

== Synthesis ==
Naphtharazin can be prepared by condensation of 1,4-dimethoxybenzene with 2,3-dichloromaleic anhydride followed by reductive dechlorination and reoxidation.

Naphtharazin can also be obtained by oxidation of 5,8-dihydroxy-1-tetralone with manganese dioxide (MnO_{2}).
