= Austrocortilutein =

Names
- IUPAC name (3S)-1,3,8-Trihydroxy-6-methoxy-3-methyl-2,4-dihydro-1H-anthracene-9,10-dione

Identifiers
CAS Number	97400-70-9
3D model (JSmol)	Interactive image
ChemSpider	9510649
PubChem CID	5459129
- InChI: InChI=1S/C16H16O6/c1-16(21)5-9-13(11(18)6-16)15(20)12-8(14(9)19)3-7(22-2)4-10(12)17/h3-4,11,17-18,21H,5-6H2,1-2H3/t11-,16-/m0/s1 Key: LRHFZXBVDMVFCW-ZBEGNZNMSA-N; InChI=1/C16H16O6/c1-16(21)5-9-13(11(18)6-16)15(20)12-8(14(9)19)3-7(22-2)4-10(12)17/h3-4,11,17-18,21H,5-6H2,1-2H3/t11-,16-/m0/s1 Key: LRHFZXBVDMVFCW-ZBEGNZNMBC
- SMILES: C[C@]1(CC(C2=C(C1)C(=O)C3=CC(=CC(=C3C2=O)O)OC)O)O

Properties
Chemical formula	C_{16}H_{16}O_{6}
Molar mass	304.298 g·mol^{−1}
- Except where otherwise noted, data are given for materials in their standard state (at 25 °C [77 °F], 100 kPa). Infobox references

Austrocortilutein is an organic compound that also serves as an antibacterial metabolite found in the Dermocybe splendida mushroom.
