= Sappanol =

Names
- IUPAC name (3R,4S)-1′(3)a-Homoisoflavan-3,3′,4,4′,7-pentol
- Systematic IUPAC name (3R,4S)-3-[(3,4-Dihydroxyphenyl)methyl]-3,4-dihydro-2H-1-benzopyran-3,4,7-triol

Identifiers
CAS Number	111254-19-4
3D model (JSmol)	Interactive image
ChEMBL	ChEMBL477779
ChemSpider	10405207
PubChem CID	13846649
UNII	98CDE6U7UL
CompTox Dashboard (EPA)	DTXSID501031877
- InChI: InChI=1S/C16H16O6/c17-10-2-3-11-14(6-10)22-8-16(21,15(11)20)7-9-1-4-12(18)13(19)5-9/h1-6,15,17-21H,7-8H2/t15-,16+/m0/s1 Key: MPGFEHZDABUJFR-JKSUJKDBSA-N
- SMILES: C1[C@@]([C@H](C2=C(O1)C=C(C=C2)O)O)(CC3=CC(=C(C=C3)O)O)O

Properties
Chemical formula	C_{16}H_{16}O_{6}
Molar mass	304.298 g·mol^{−1}
- Except where otherwise noted, data are given for materials in their standard state (at 25 °C [77 °F], 100 kPa). Infobox references

Sappanol is a 3,4-dihydroxyhomoisoflavan, a type of homoisoflavonoid, that can be found in Caesalpinia sappan.
