= Hooker reaction =

Chemical reaction

The Hooker reaction is an oxidative rearrangement reaction, discovered by Stanley C. Hooker in 1936, in which 2-hydroxy-3-alkyl-1,4-naphthoquinones are treated with an aqueous solution of potassium hydroxide and potassium permanganate to shorten the C3 alkyl side chain by one carbon atom (which bubbles out of solution as carbon dioxide).

Mechanistically oxidation causes ring-cleavage at the alkene group, extrusion of carbon dioxide in decarboxylation with subsequent ring-closure.
