= Furil =

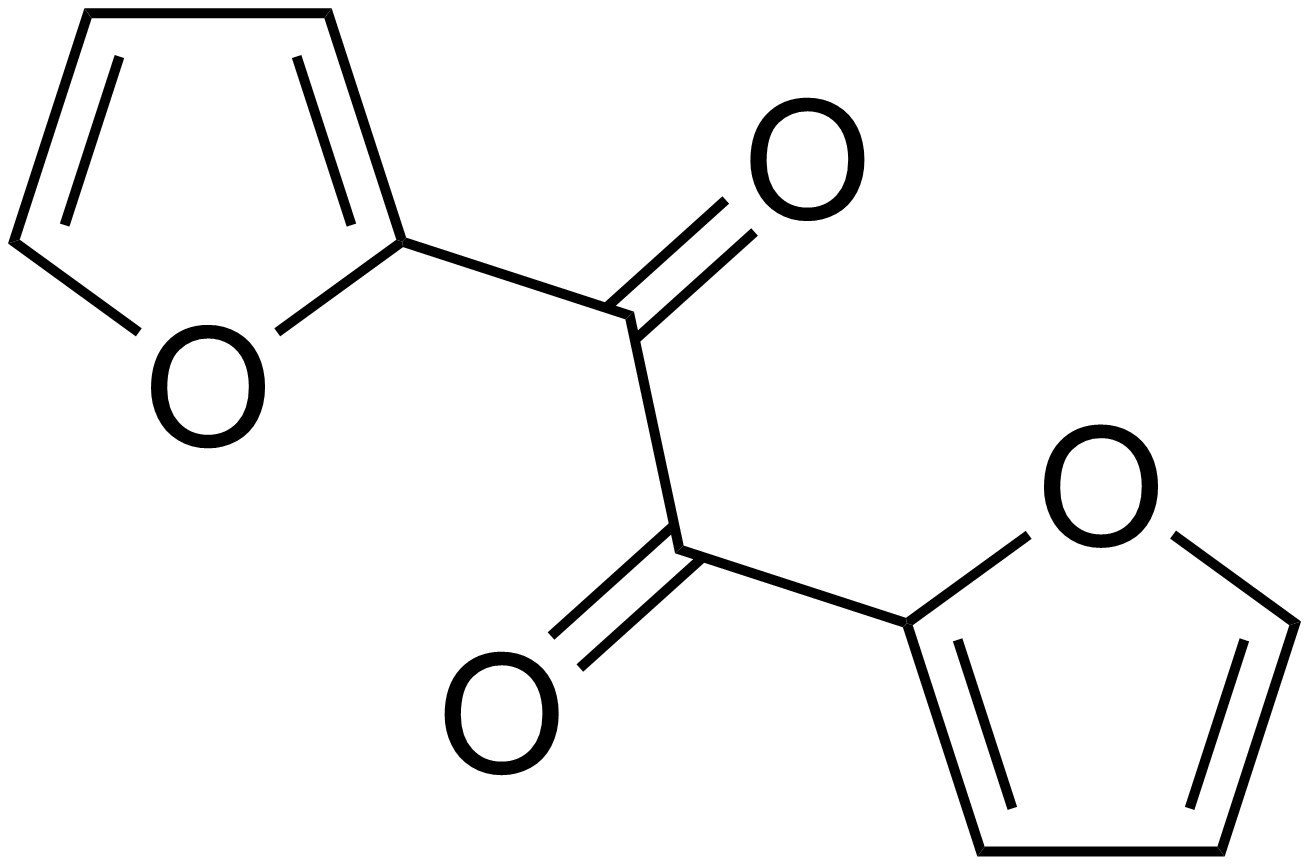

Names
- Preferred IUPAC name Di(furan-2-yl)ethanedione
- Other names: Bipyromucyl; Di-2-furanylethanedione; Di-2-furylglyoxal; 2,2'-Furil

Identifiers
CAS Number	492-94-4
3D model (JSmol)	Interactive image; Interactive image
ChEMBL	ChEMBL371181
ChemSpider	61427
ECHA InfoCard	100.007.061
EC Number	207-766-7
PubChem CID	68119
UNII	3AFE4C3P1F
CompTox Dashboard (EPA)	DTXSID3049413
- InChI: InChI=1S/C10H6O4/c11-9(7-3-1-5-13-7)10(12)8-4-2-6-14-8/h1-6H Key: SXPUVBFQXJHYNS-UHFFFAOYSA-N; InChI=1/C10H6O4/c11-9(7-3-1-5-13-7)10(12)8-4-2-6-14-8/h1-6H Key: SXPUVBFQXJHYNS-UHFFFAOYAE
- SMILES: C1=COC(=C1)C(=O)C(=O)C2=CC=CO2; O=C(C(=O)c1occc1)c2occc2

Properties
Chemical formula	C_{10}H_{6}O_{4}
Molar mass	190.15 g/mol
Appearance	yellow-brown powder
Melting point	163 to 165 °C (325 to 329 °F; 436 to 438 K)
- Except where otherwise noted, data are given for materials in their standard state (at 25 °C [77 °F], 100 kPa). verify (what is ?) Infobox references

Furil, also commonly known as α-furil or 2,2′-furil, is a furan compound.
