= Asphodeline tenuior =

Thin asphodeline

Conservation status
- Vulnerable (IUCN 3.1)

Scientific classification
- Kingdom: Plantae
- Clade: Tracheophytes
- Clade: Angiosperms
- Clade: Monocots
- Order: Asparagales
- Family: Asphodelaceae
- Subfamily: Asphodeloideae
- Genus: Asphodeline
- Species: A. tenuior

Binomial name
- Asphodeline tenuior (Fisch. ex M.Bieb.) Ledeb.

Synonyms
- Asphodelus tenuior Fisch. ex M.Bieb.; Asphodelus tauricus G.Lodd. 1826 not Pall. ex Bieb. 1776; Heroion filiformis Raf.; Asphodelus tenuiflorus K.Koch; Asphodeline tenuiflora (K.Koch) Miscz.; Asphodelus szovitsii K.Koch; Asphodelus persicus Fisch. & C.A.Mey. ex Boiss. 1882 not Jaub. & Spach 1844; Asphodeline szovitsii (K.Koch) Miscz.

Species of flowering plant

Asphodeline tenuior, the thin asphodeline, is a species of plant in the family Asphodelaceae, subfamily Asphodeloideae. It is native to the Caucasus (southern Russia, Georgia, Armenia, Azerbaijan), as well as from eastern Turkey and northwestern Iran. Within Russia, it is known from eastern Krasnodar Krai, Karachay-Cherkessia, Stavropol Krai and western Kabardino-Balkaria. It can be found on stony slopes and scree on limestone and sandstone, from elevations of 500–1,000 m. It is threatened by habitat loss and degradation, due to lime pits, slope terracing and cattle pasturing.

Subspecies and varieties

1. Asphodeline tenuior var. puberulenta Tuzlaci - eastern Turkey
2. Asphodeline tenuior subsp. tenuiflora (K.Koch) Tuzlaci - Turkey, Iran, south Caucasus
3. Asphodeline tenuior subsp. tenuior - north and south Caucasus

Tenual and tenucarb are two natural products, built around a 3-benzoxepin core, which have been isolated from A. tenuior and A. taurica.
