= Oxepine =

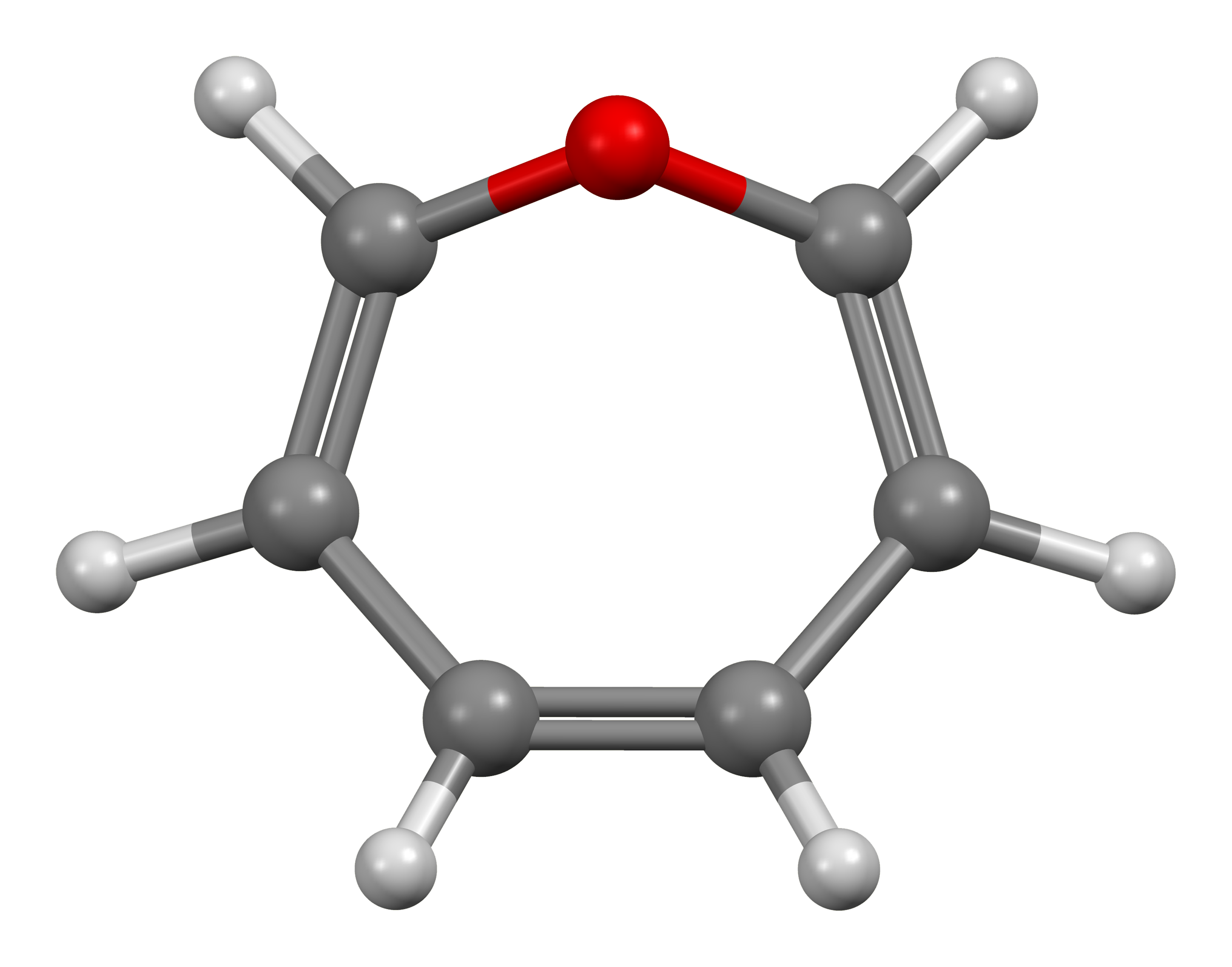

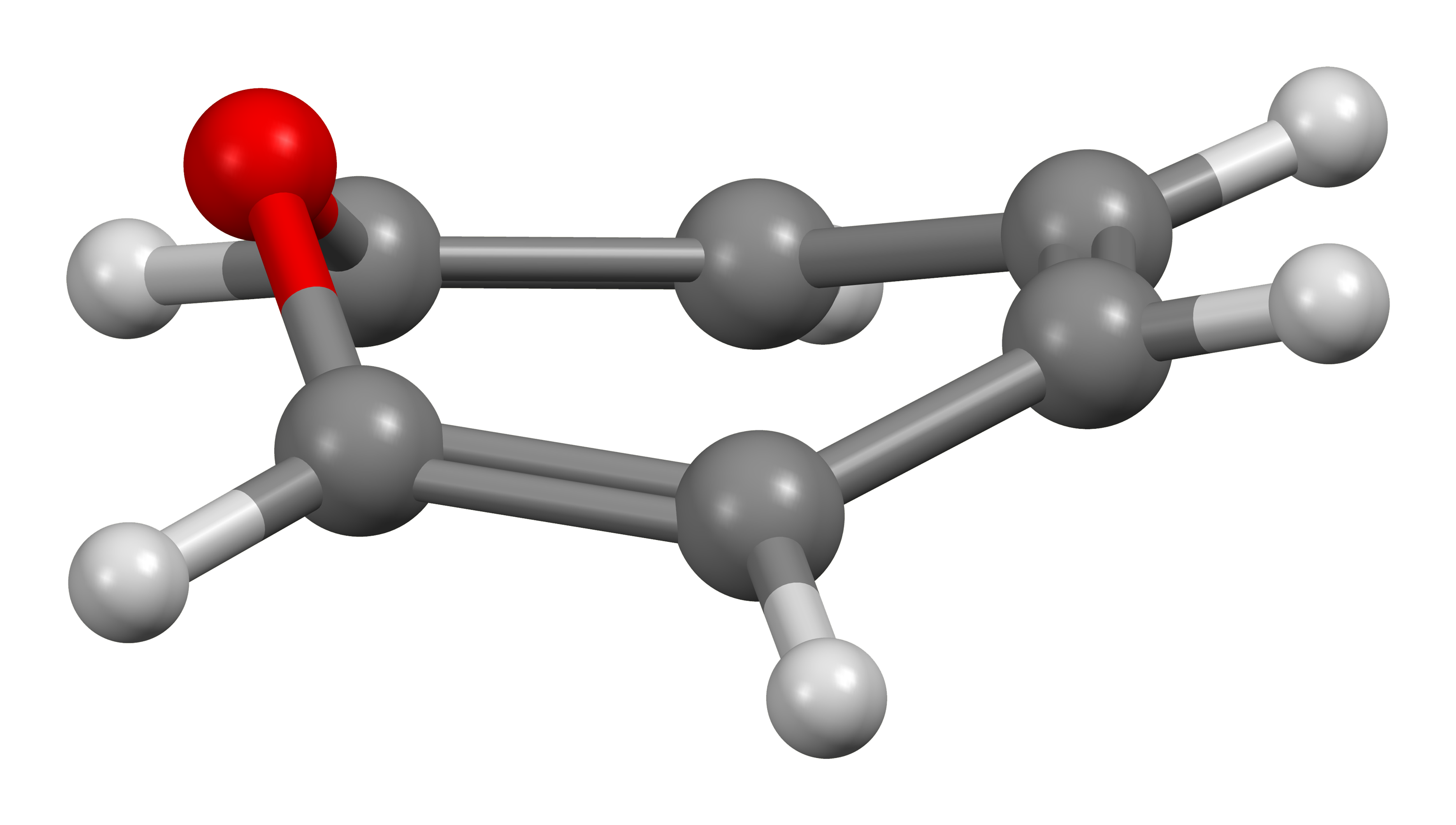

Names
- Preferred IUPAC name Oxepine
- Other names Oxacycloheptatriene

Identifiers
CAS Number	291-70-3
3D model (JSmol)	Interactive image
ChemSpider	4953942
PubChem CID	6451477
UNII	CVP5X85XX5
CompTox Dashboard (EPA)	DTXSID10183353
- InChI: InChI=1S/C6H6O/c1-2-4-6-7-5-3-1/h1-6H Key: ATYBXHSAIOKLMG-UHFFFAOYSA-N; InChI=1/C6H6O/c1-2-4-6-7-5-3-1/h1-6H Key: ATYBXHSAIOKLMG-UHFFFAOYAS
- SMILES: C1=CC=COC=C1

Properties
Chemical formula	C_{6}H_{6}O
Molar mass	94.113 g·mol^{−1}

Related compounds
Related compounds	Cyclohexene oxide Oxonane
- Except where otherwise noted, data are given for materials in their standard state (at 25 °C [77 °F], 100 kPa). verify (what is ?) Infobox references

Oxepine is an oxygen-containing heterocycle consisting of a seven-membered ring with three double bonds. The parent C_{6}H_{6}O exists as an equilibrium mixture with benzene oxide.

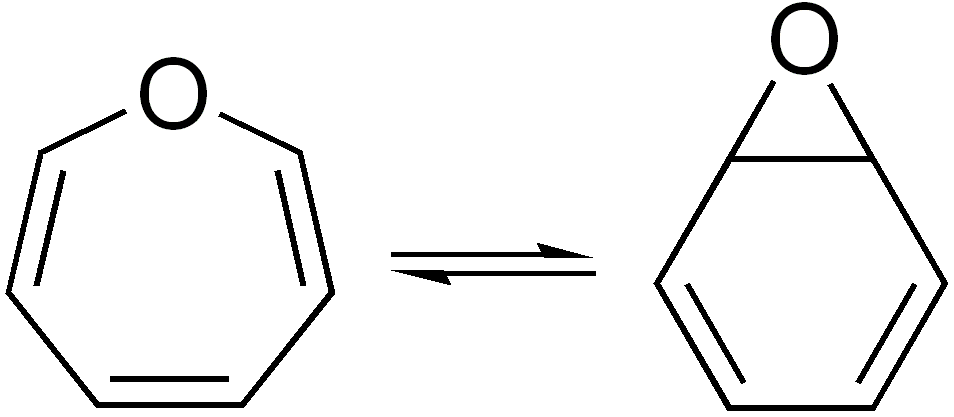

The oxepin–benzene oxide equilibrium is affected by the ring substituents. A related dimethyl derivative exists mainly as the oxepine isomer, an orange liquid.

In nature, oxepine is an intermediate in the oxidation of benzene by the cytochrome P450 (CYP). Other arene oxides are metabolites of the parent arene.

Benzene oxides are produced in the laboratory from dehydrohalogenation of the corresponding dihaloepoxide:
