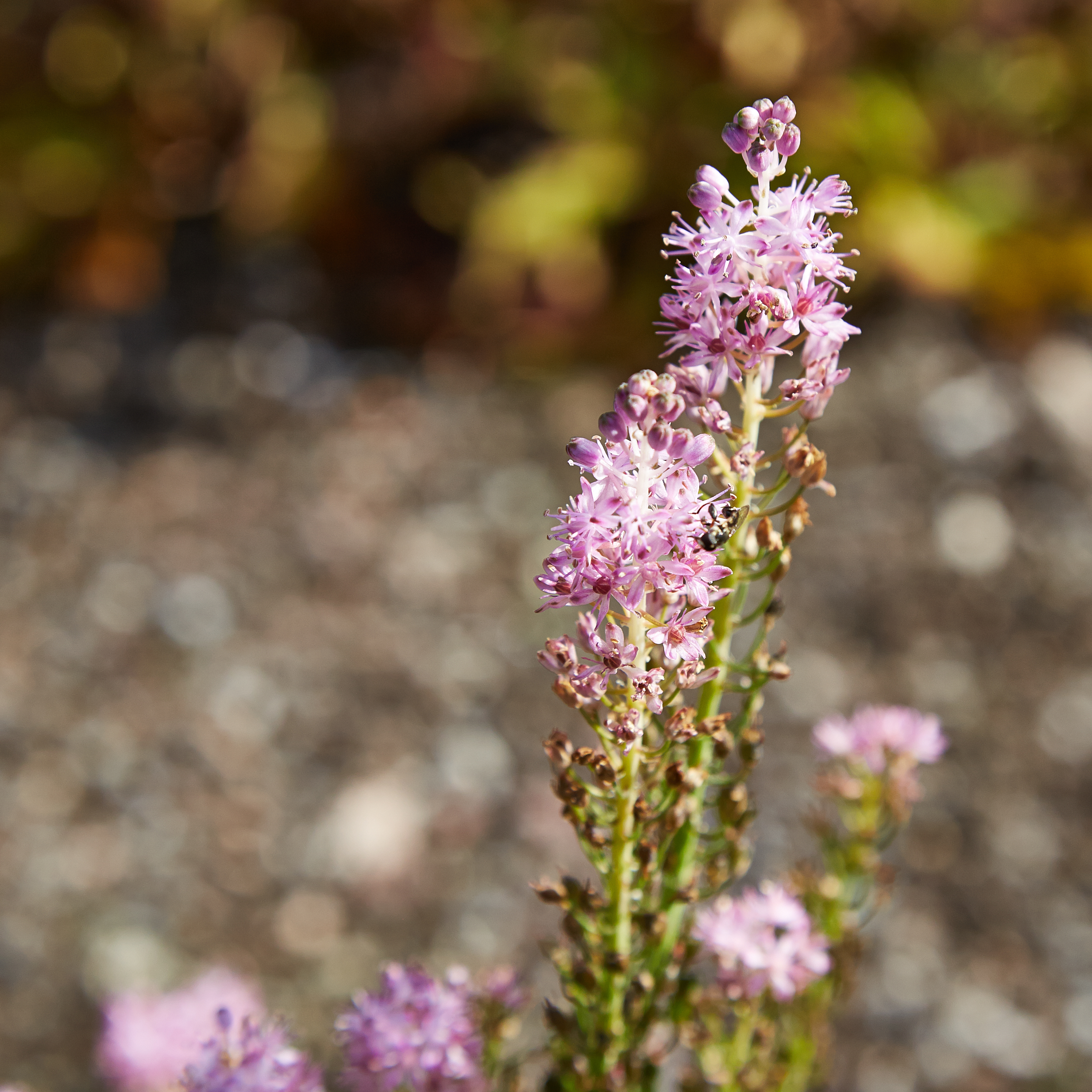

Scientific classification
- Kingdom: Plantae
- Clade: Tracheophytes
- Clade: Angiosperms
- Clade: Monocots
- Order: Asparagales
- Family: Asparagaceae
- Subfamily: Scilloideae
- Genus: Barnardia
- Species: B. japonica

Binomial name
- Barnardia japonica (Thunb.) Schult. & Schult.f.

Synonyms
- Ornithogalum japonicum Thunb.; Barnardia scilloides Lindl.; Barnardia sinensis (Lour.) Speta; Scilla chinensis Benth., nom. illeg.; Scilla japonica Baker, nom. illeg.; Scilla sinensis (Lour.) Merr; Scilla scilloides (Lindl.) Druce

= Barnardia japonica =

Species of plant

Barnardia japonica, the Japanese jacinth or murut, is a bulbous flowering plant in the family Asparagaceae, subfamily Scilloideae (also treated as the family Hyacinthaceae). It is one of the two species of the genus Barnardia, found in east China, Korea, Japan, Taiwan and East Russia.

== Description ==
The plant bears a terminal raceme of pink small flowers. It is said to resemble a fox's tail. The shape of the plant is elegant. Its habitats include open slopes and forest margins.

== Systematics and taxonomy ==
The genus Barnardia was created by John Lindley in 1826 together with the single species B. scilloides. However, this species had already been described as Ornithogalum japonicum by Carl Peter Thunberg in 1784, so that it is now called B. japonica.

The plant forms a genetic complex with two genome types, noted A and B, and diploid, allo-triploid and aneuploid specimens in natural populations.

== Natural occurrences ==
In China (Chinese name:棉棗兒 or 绵枣儿), it can be found in Guangdong, Guangxi, Hebei, Heilongjiang, Henan, Hubei, Hunan, Jiangsu, Jiangxi, Jilin, Liaoning, Nei Mongol, Shanxi, Sichuan and Yunnan.

In Northern Taiwan, the plant occupies habitats under 700 meters high in a small amount. From July to August, it can be easily spotted on the open hillsides or fields along the roads in Dongyin and Xiyin Island. It also can be found in Nangan, but most specimens are in Dongyin and Xiyin. It has been listed as a candidate for the "township flower" of Dongyin.

In Russia, it is found around Vladivostok, though it is probably extinct there (according to the Red Data Book of Russia).

== Cultivation ==
Barnardia japonica is cultivated as an ornamental bulb. In a temperate climate it requires a sunny position where it flowers in the autumn. As well as the normal pink-flowered form, a white form (Scilla scilloides var. albo-viridis) is in cultivation.

== Uses ==
The leaves and roots are edible. The bulbs can be used in medicine.

== Chemistry ==
The homoisoflavones scillavones A and B can be isolated from the bulbs of B japonica.

The bulb also contains eucosterol glycosides showing anti-tumor activities.
