= 1,2-Naphthoquinone =

- 1,2-Naphthoquinone

Names
- Preferred IUPAC name Naphthalene-1,2-dione
- Other names o-Naphthoquinone, β-naphthoquinone

Identifiers
CAS Number	524-42-5
3D model (JSmol)	Interactive image
ChEBI	CHEBI:34055
ChEMBL	ChEMBL52347
ChemSpider	10217
ECHA InfoCard	100.007.602
KEGG	C14783
PubChem CID	10667
UNII	804K62F61Q
CompTox Dashboard (EPA)	DTXSID2060171
- InChI: InChI=1S/C10H6O2/c11-9-6-5-7-3-1-2-4-8(7)10(9)12/h1-6H Key: KETQAJRQOHHATG-UHFFFAOYSA-N; InChI=1/C10H6O2/c11-9-6-5-7-3-1-2-4-8(7)10(9)12/h1-6H Key: KETQAJRQOHHATG-UHFFFAOYAZ
- SMILES: O=C1c2ccccc2\C=C/C1=O

Properties
Chemical formula	C_{10}H_{6}O_{2}
Molar mass	158.156 g·mol^{−1}
Appearance	yellow solid
Melting point	145 to 147 °C (293 to 297 °F; 418 to 420 K)
- Except where otherwise noted, data are given for materials in their standard state (at 25 °C [77 °F], 100 kPa). verify (what is ?) Infobox references

1,2-Naphthoquinone or ortho-naphthoquinone is a polycyclic aromatic organic compound with formula C_{10}H_{6}O_{2}. It is classified as a 1,2-diketone as well as an ortho-quinone. More specifically, it is one of several naphthoquinones.

== Preparation and occurrence ==
1,2-Naphthoquinone is produced commercially by air-oxidation of 1-naphthol in the presence of copper catalyst. A laboratory route involved oxidation of 1-amino-2-hydroxynaphthalene with ferric chloride.

It is a metabolite of naphthalene. It arises from the naphthalene-1,2-oxide.

It is also found in diesel exhaust particles. The accumulation of 1,2-naphthoquinone has been shown to damage the eyes of rats.

== See also ==
- 1,4-Naphthoquinone, an isomer of 1,2-naphthoquinone
- Diazonaphthoquinone, a diazo derivative of 1,2-naphthoquinone
