= Spinochrome E =

- Skeletal formula

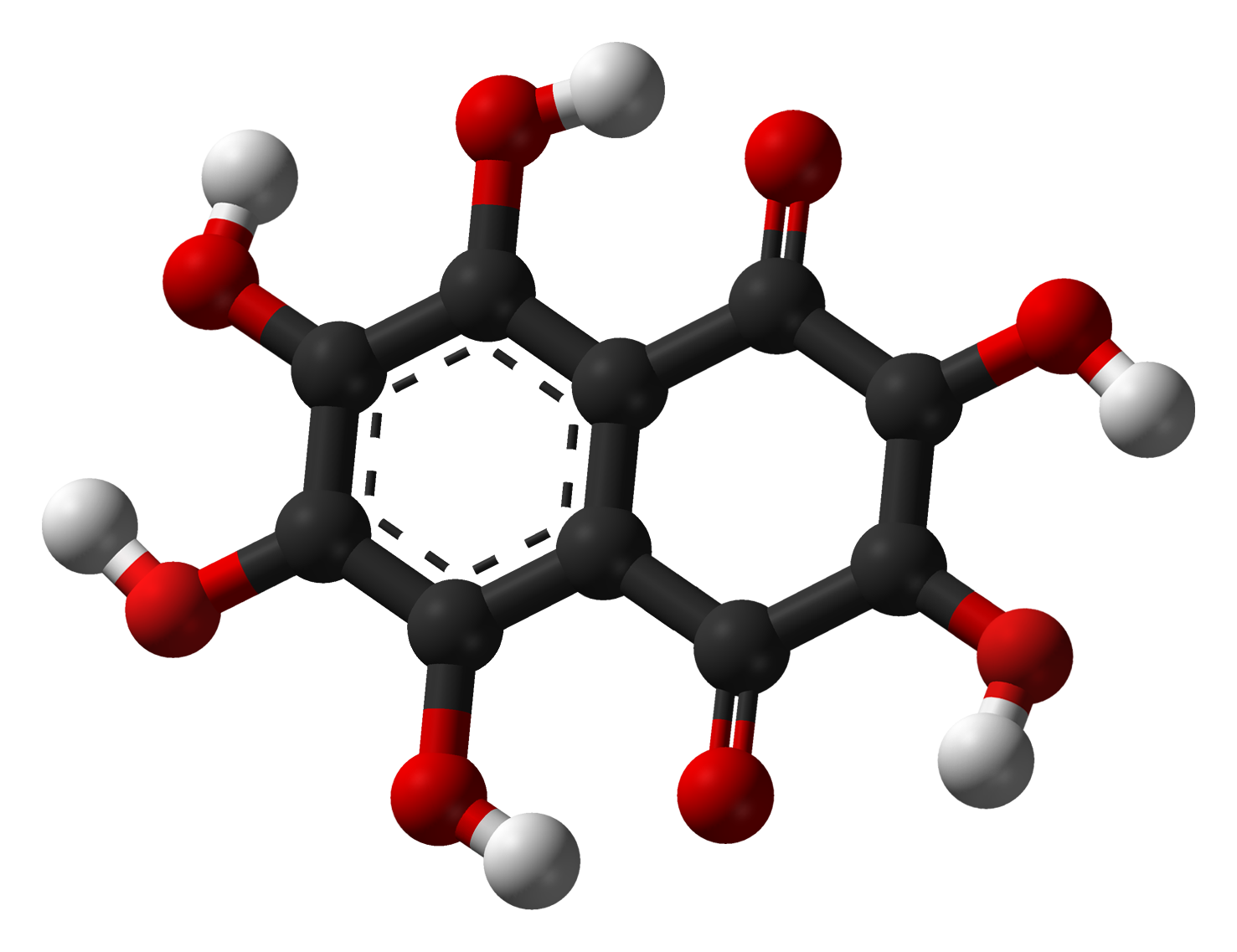
- Ball-and-stick model

Names
- Preferred IUPAC name 2,3,5,6,7,8-Hexahydroxynaphthalene-1,4-dione
- Other names Hexahydroxynaphthalene-1,4-dione; Spinochrome E

Identifiers
CAS Number	476-37-9
3D model (JSmol)	Interactive image
ChemSpider	15712468
PubChem CID	135409398
UNII	5DJZ444YV5
CompTox Dashboard (EPA)	DTXSID20431231
- InChI: InChI=1S/C10H6O8/c11-3-1-2(5(13)9(17)7(3)15)6(14)10(18)8(16)4(1)12/h11,13,15-18H Key: RUQPQFLYDCXMGX-UHFFFAOYSA-N
- SMILES: OC1=C(O)C(=O)C2=C(C1=O)C(O)=C(O)C(O)=C2O

Properties
Chemical formula	C_{10}H_{6}O_{8}
Molar mass	254.150 g·mol^{−1}
- Except where otherwise noted, data are given for materials in their standard state (at 25 °C [77 °F], 100 kPa). Infobox references

Spinochrome E (also called 2,3,5,6,7,8-hexahydroxy-1,4-naphthalenedione or hexahydroxynaphthoquinone) is a polyhydroxylated 1,4-naphthoquinone pigment found in sea urchin shell ("test"), spine, gonads, coelomic fluid, and eggs, of sea urchin commonly known as spinochromes. These natural phenolic compounds are quinones with potential pharmacological properties. The several hydroxyl groups are appropriate for free-radical scavenging, which diminishes ROS and prevents redox imbalance. Mechanisms are described such as scavenging of reactive oxygen species (ROS), interaction with lipid peroxide radicals, chelation of metal ions, inhibition of lipid peroxidation and regulation of the cell redox potential.

The chemical formula of spinochrome E, C_{10}H_{6}O_{8}, indicates that it has one extra hydroxyl group relative to echinochrome A and it is formally derived from naphthoquinone (1,4-naphtalenedione) through replacement of all six hydrogen atoms by hydroxyl (OH) groups. The numerical prefixes "2,3,5,6,7,8" are superfluous, since there is no other hexahydroxy derivative of 1,4-naphthoquinone.

Spinochrome from sea urchins, in oriental culture, are known for putative health benefits. The sea urchin appears in the "Materia medica" of the Ming Dynasty author by Li Zhongli in 1647 and the benefits cited are for the heart, bones, blood and also it counteracts impotence. Today it is known the benefits for the health of these compounds.

The compound can be produced by condensation of 3,4,5,6-tetramethoxyphthalaldehyde with glyoxal.

== See also ==
- Hexahydroxy-2,3-naphthalenedione, a structural isomer.
- Tetrahydroxybenzoquinone
- Octahydroxyanthraquinone
