= Tenual =

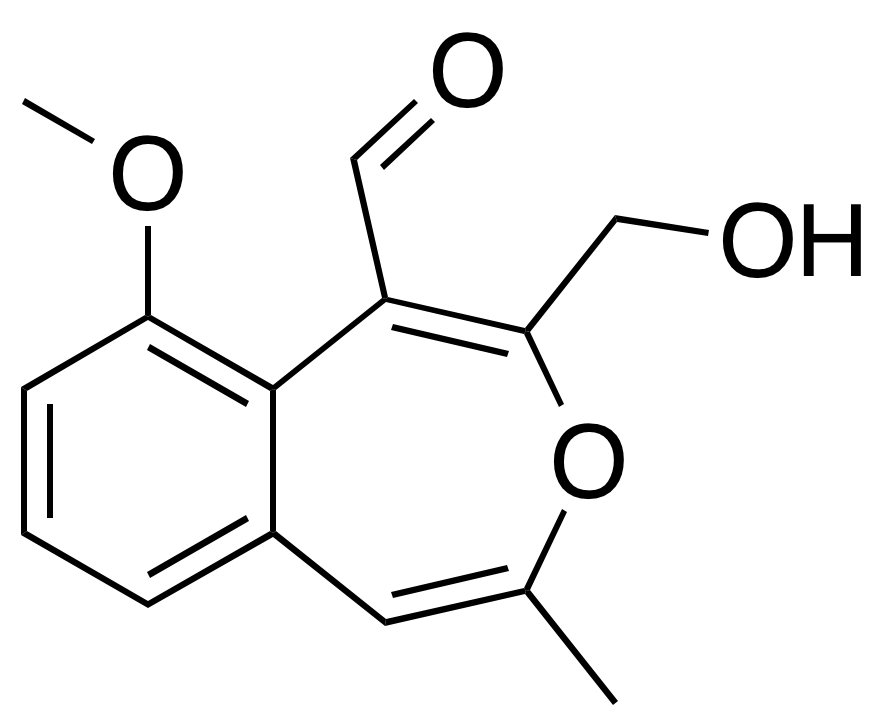

Names
- IUPAC name 4-(hydroxymethyl)-6-methoxy-2-methyl-3-benzoxepine-5-carbaldehyde

Identifiers
3D model (JSmol)	Interactive image
ChemSpider	73952351
PubChem CID	14258969
- InChI: InChI=1S/C14H14O4/c1-9-6-10-4-3-5-12(17-2)14(10)11(7-15)13(8-16)18-9/h3-7,16H,8H2,1-2H3 Key: CREMPVZYABCSKM-UHFFFAOYSA-N
- SMILES: COc1cccc2c1C(C=O)=C(CO)OC(C)=C2

Properties
Chemical formula	C_{14}H_{14}O_{4}
Molar mass	246.262 g·mol^{−1}
- Except where otherwise noted, data are given for materials in their standard state (at 25 °C [77 °F], 100 kPa). Infobox references

Tenual is a natural product derived from Asphodeline tenuior. It is a 3-benzoxepin derivative with methoxy, methyl, hydroxymethyl, and carbaldehyde side chains.
