= Naphthoquinone =

Diketone derived from naphthalene

Chemical structure of 1,4-naphthoquinone

Naphthoquinones constitute a class of organic compounds (quinones) structurally related to naphthalene. The 1,2- and 1,4-isomers are common but others exist:

- 1,2-Naphthoquinone
- 1,4-Naphthoquinone
- 2,6-Naphthoquinone

== Use and occurrence ==
Many natural products feature naphthoquinones, especially the 1,4 isomer.

Amine-substituted naphthoquiones, e.g. Artisil Blue GFL and Helindon Yellow R, were once used as dyes. Some interest remains in this area.

== See also ==
- Hydroxynaphthoquinones
