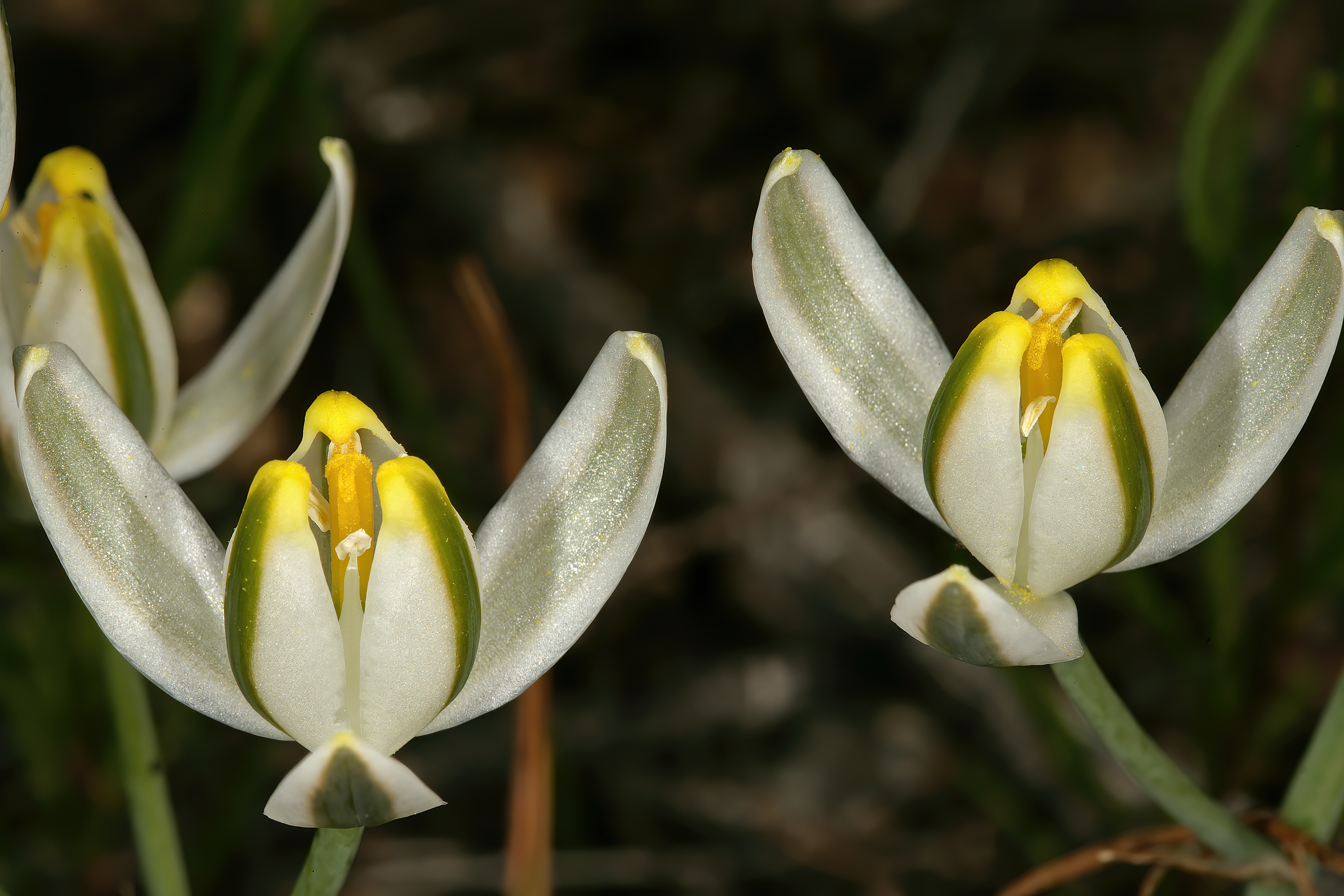

Scientific classification
- Kingdom: Plantae
- Clade: Tracheophytes
- Clade: Angiosperms
- Clade: Monocots
- Order: Asparagales
- Family: Asparagaceae
- Subfamily: Scilloideae
- Genus: Albuca
- Species: A. longipes

Binomial name
- Albuca longipes Baker

= Albuca longipes =

Species of plant

Albuca longipes is a species of small, perennial, bulbous plant in the asparagus family that is widespread across the western portion of southern Africa. It occurs throughout the winter-rainfall regime, from southern Namibia in the north, southwards as far as Cape Town, and eastwards as far as Willowmore.

== Description ==
The leaves are erect and deeply channeled. They often desiccate in the dry Spring and Summer when the flowers appear.

It has white flowers with thick darker central lines. Like Albuca setosa, its flowers are held erect (not drooping). It flowers in late Spring.
