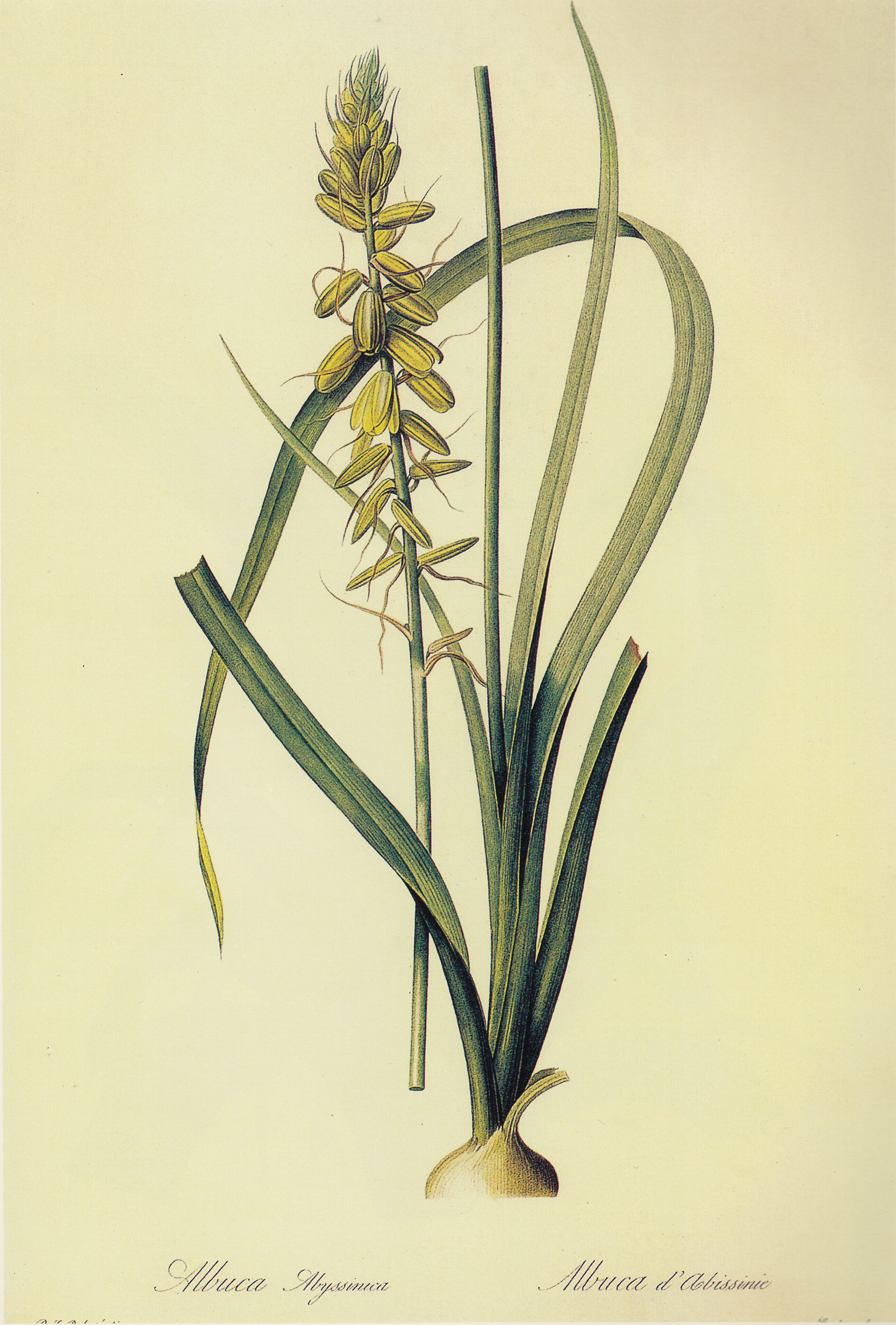
- illustration of Albuca abyssinica

Scientific classification
- Kingdom: Plantae
- Clade: Tracheophytes
- Clade: Angiosperms
- Clade: Monocots
- Order: Asparagales
- Family: Asparagaceae
- Subfamily: Scilloideae
- Genus: Albuca
- Species: A. abyssinica

Binomial name
- Albuca abyssinica Jacq.

Synonyms
- Albuca allenae; Albuca angolensis; Albuca asclepiadea; Albuca bainesii; Albuca beguinotii; Albuca blepharophylla; Albuca capitata; Albuca chaetopoda; Albuca elastica; Albuca elwesii; Albuca erlangeriana; Albuca fibrillosa; Albuca fischeri; Albuca fleckii; Albuca hysterantha; Albuca lugardii; Albuca melleri; Albuca nemorosa; Albuca parviflora; Albuca praecox; Albuca purpurascens; Albuca tayloriana; Albuca wakefieldii; Asphodelus abyssinicus; Asphodelus africanus; Ornithogalum fleckii; Ornithogalum melleri; Ornithogalum monteiroi; Ornithogalum quartinianum; Pallastema abyssinica; Scilla petitiana; Scilla quartiniana; Urginea acinacifolia; Urginea beccarii; Urginea petitiana; Urginea quartiniana

= Albuca abyssinica =

Species of flowering plant

Albuca abyssinica (syn. Albuca melleri), known in Tanzania by the common names koyosa and kitunguu pori, is a species of flowering plant in the family Asparagaceae, native to tropical regions in Africa. The flowers grow terminal racemes 20 – 30 cm long with the plant achieving heights between 60 and 100 cm. Its bulb has been used to treat inflammation and for dressing wounds.
