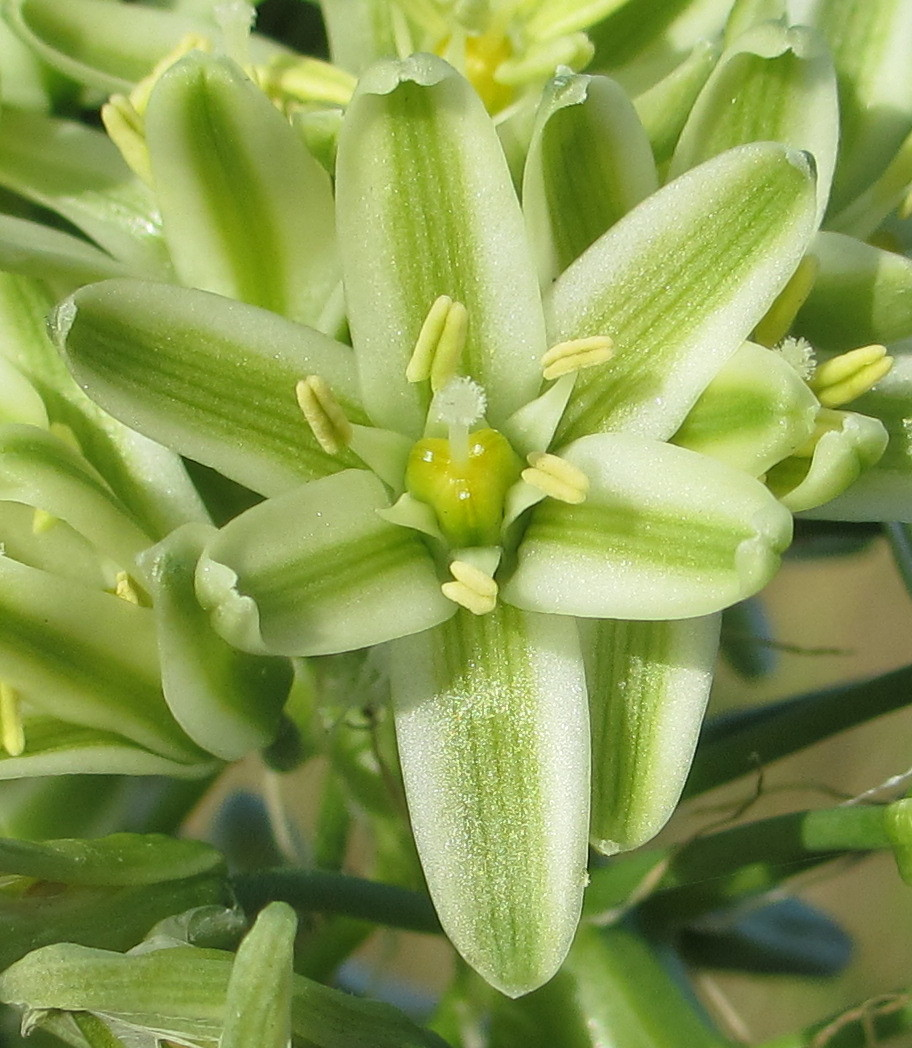

Scientific classification
- Kingdom: Plantae
- Clade: Tracheophytes
- Clade: Angiosperms
- Clade: Monocots
- Order: Asparagales
- Family: Asparagaceae
- Subfamily: Scilloideae
- Genus: Albuca
- Species: A. bracteata

Binomial name
- Albuca bracteata (Thunb.) J.C.Manning & Goldblatt

Synonyms
- Ornithogalum bracteatum Thunb.; Ornithogalum longebracteatum Jacq.; Ornithogalum caudatum Aiton; (incomplete list)

= Albuca bracteata =

Species of flowering plant

Albuca bracteata (syn. Ornithogalum longebracteatum), is known by the common names pregnant onion, false sea onion, and sea-onion. It is a species of bulbous flowering plant in the family Asparagaceae. Its flowering stems can reach a height of 90 cm and can carry up to 100 greenish white flowers.

== Description ==
Strap-shaped lanceolate leaves, 60 cm (2 ft) long and 2.5 cm (1 in) wide, protrude from a bulky bulb which is largely above ground. The roots are white and succulent. Many small, fragrant, white flowers, with a diameter of 0.5 cm and a green midvein, are located on racemes that can reach 70–90 cm tall. Flowering usually occurs from spring through to early winter (May to August in the northern hemisphere), with 50 to 100 flowers per stalk. One plant can have up to 300 flowers at one time. Fruit capsules are 10 mm long and 6 mm in diameter. Seeds are oblong with dimensions of 4 by 1.5 mm. Albuca bracteata is a cryptophyte, as the foliage dies back during drought periods.

== Taxonomy ==
Albuca bracteata was first described in 1794 by Carl Peter Thunberg, as Ornithogalum bracteatum. The specific epithet bracteatum refers to the bracts in the inflorescence; Thunberg described the species as "with longer flower bracts" (Latin: bracteis floribus longioribus). It was transferred to Albuca in 2009, along with other species of Ornithogalum, based on a molecular phylogenetic study.

== Distribution and habitat ==
Albuca bracteata is native to South Africa (the Cape Provinces and KwaZulu-Natal). It is also found in tropical east Africa, where it may be native or introduced. It can be found growing in forests, forest margins, closed woodland and sheltered slopes. As of 2012, it had stable native populations with a conservation status of "least concern". It grows at altitudes of 0–300 m above sea level.

== Cultivation ==
Albuca bracteata is primarily grown as a houseplant. It is hardy to USDA zones of 9a-10b. The ornamental value of this plant is based on the formation of bulblets. The common name "pregnant onion" is due to the small adventitious bulblets that form from the initial bulb scales, which are likened to "babies". It is frost tender, and requires light well drained soil, and bright light, although intense heat and light can scorch tissues. Consistent watering is required for seed germination and survival. Mature plants will benefit from slight drying between waterings, although underwatering will induce dormancy. During the winter months this plant can be allowed to go dormant and the bulbs stored at cooler temperatures.

=== Propagation ===
Albuca bracteata can undergo vegetative and sexual reproduction. Propagation via bulblets is the most common method, whereby the bulblets are separated from the mother bulb and planted. Seed production provides genetic variation. Micropropagation of Albuca bracteata has been achieved. Bulblet production was found to be greatest in vitro between 10–30 °C, and was inhibited at 35 °C.

=== Toxicity ===
The sap can cause contact dermatitis and most parts of this plant are considered toxic to humans. The bulb is a favoured dietary item of the Chacma baboon.

== Gallery ==
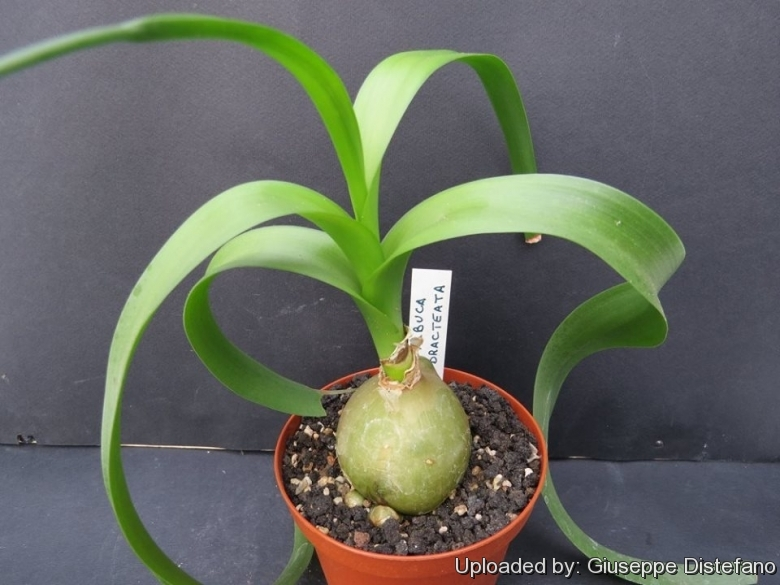

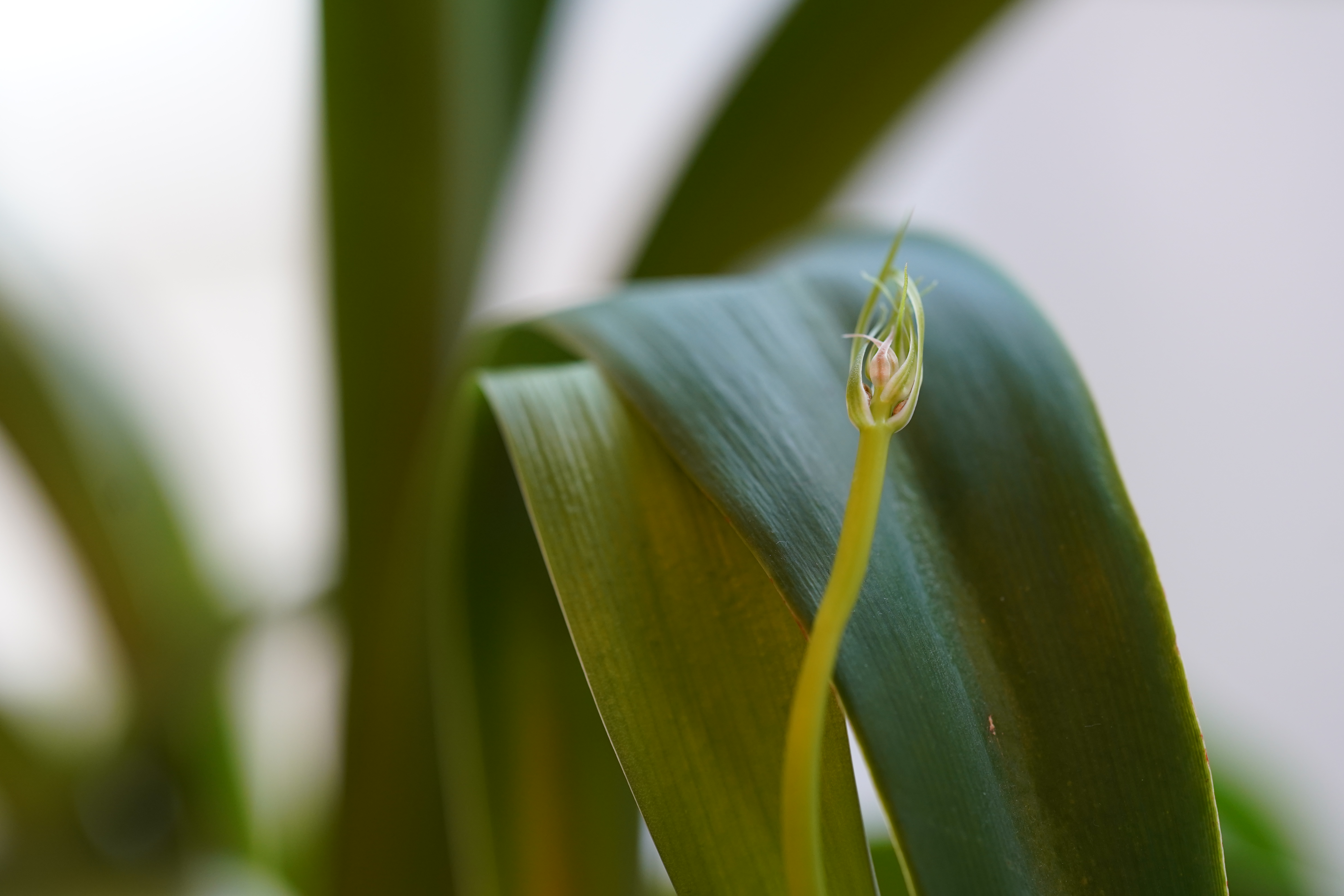

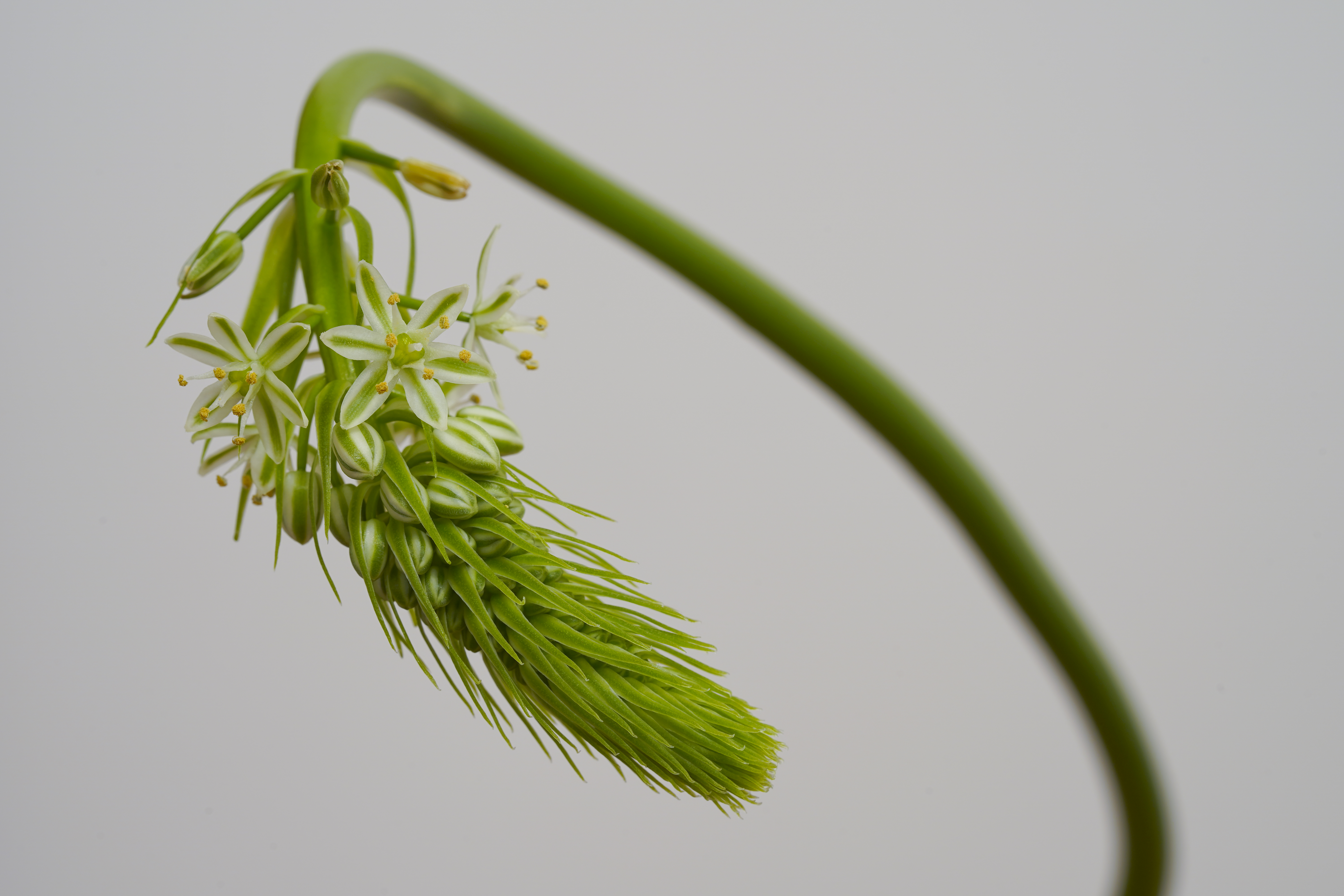

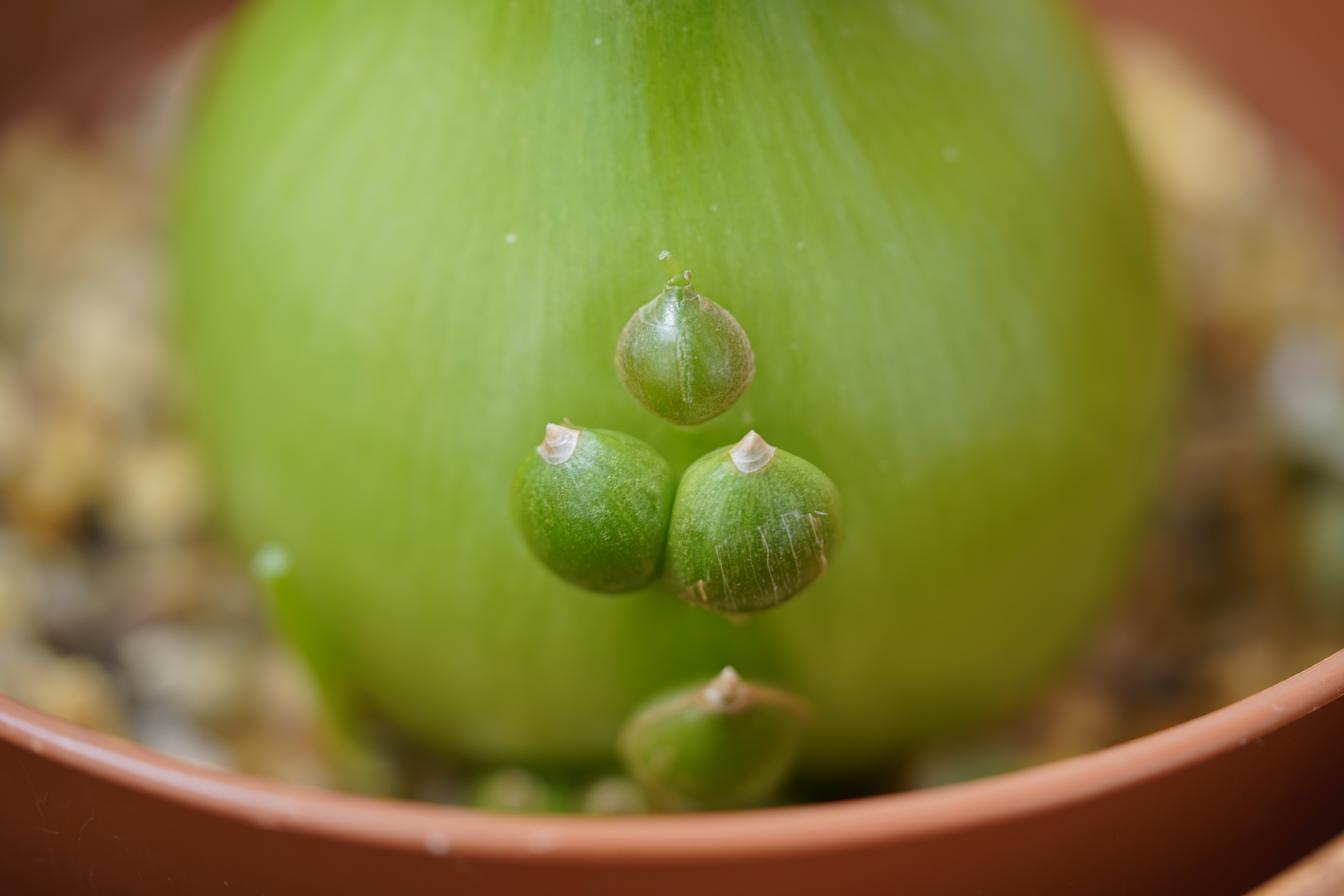

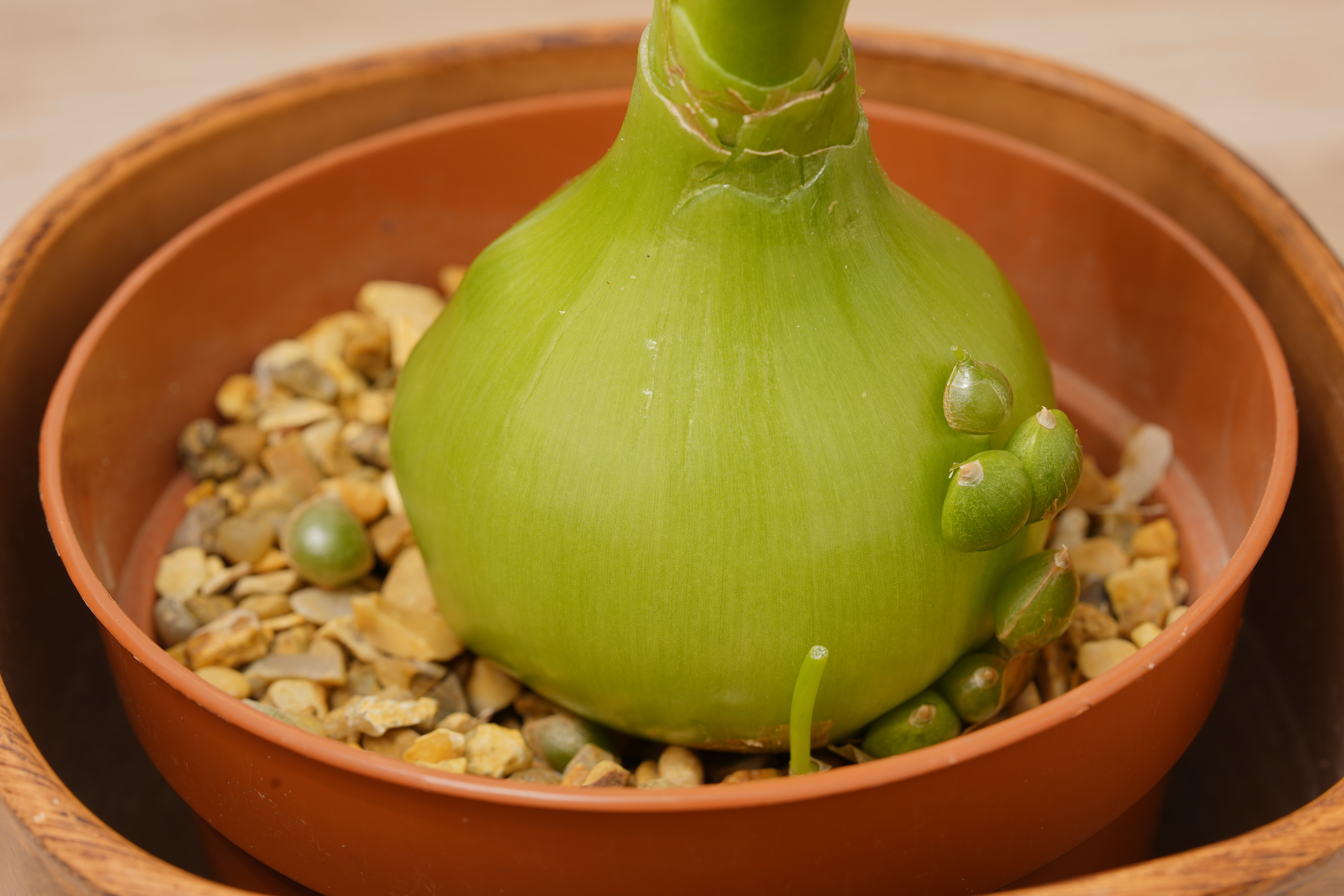
