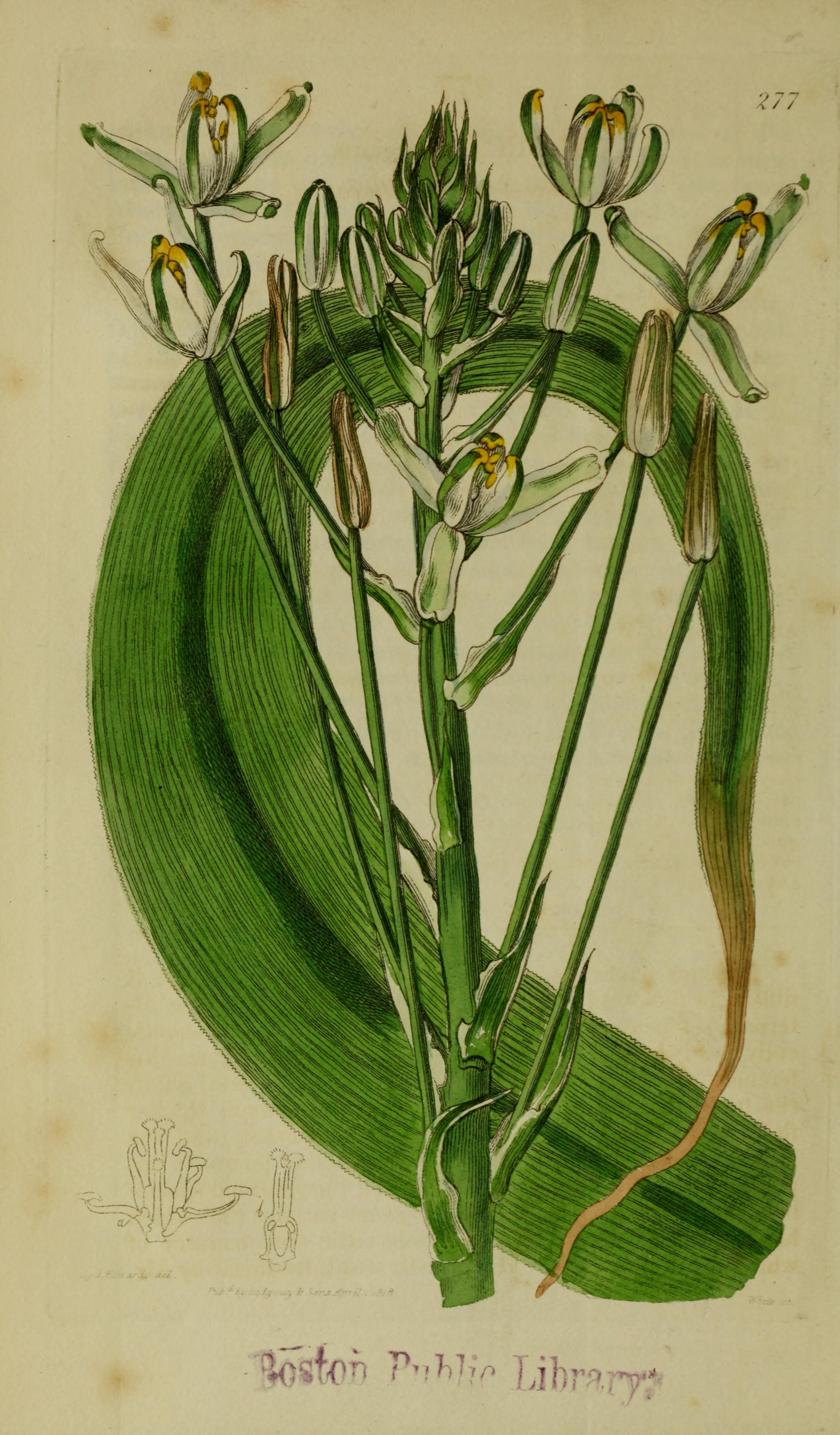
- Illustration by Sydenham Edwards

Scientific classification
- Kingdom: Plantae
- Clade: Tracheophytes
- Clade: Angiosperms
- Clade: Monocots
- Order: Asparagales
- Family: Asparagaceae
- Subfamily: Scilloideae
- Genus: Albuca
- Species: A. fastigiata

Binomial name
- Albuca fastigiata Dryand.

= Albuca fastigiata =

Species of flowering plant

Albuca fastigiata is a plant species in the genus Albuca native to the Cape Provinces of South Africa, where it is used in ethnomedicine.

A homoisoflavanone can be found in A. fastigiata.
