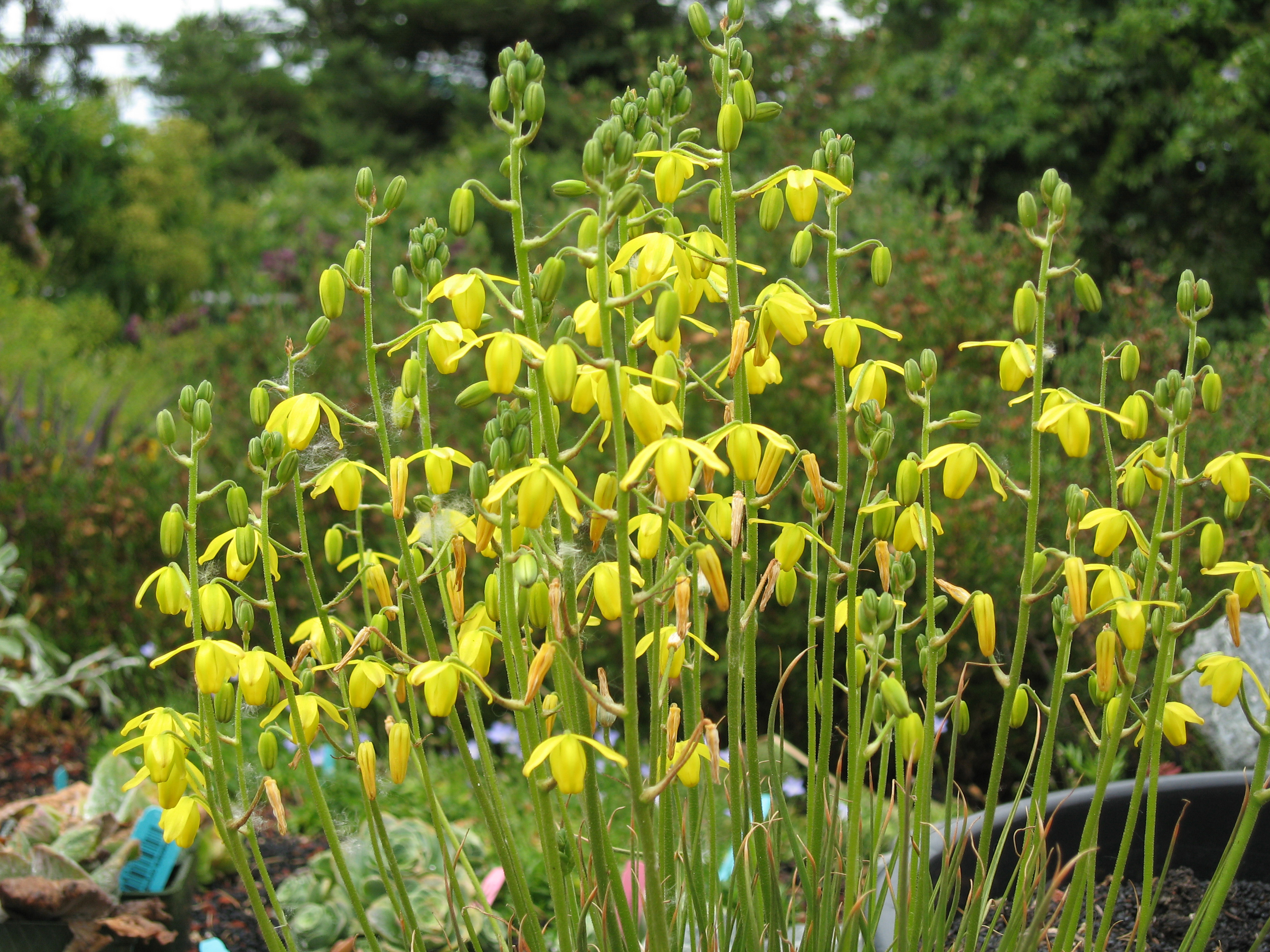

Scientific classification
- Kingdom: Plantae
- Clade: Tracheophytes
- Clade: Angiosperms
- Clade: Monocots
- Order: Asparagales
- Family: Asparagaceae
- Subfamily: Scilloideae
- Genus: Albuca
- Species: A. shawii

Binomial name
- Albuca shawii Baker

Synonyms
- Albuca elliotii Baker; Albuca granulata Baker; Albuca minima Baker; Albuca trichophylla Baker; Ornithogalum shawii (Baker) J.C.Manning & Goldblatt

= Albuca shawii =

Species of flowering plant

Albuca shawii is a species of bulbous plant from southern Africa. It flowers in the summer and has yellow flowers on stems to about 30 cm high.

== Description ==
Albuca shawii is a summer-growing and winter-dormant bulbous plant, flowering from September to February in its native habitat in southern Africa. It has narrow, somewhat fleshy leaves covered with short, slightly sticky hairs. The flower stems are around 30 cm tall and carry nodding flowers with tepals about 15 mm long, yellow with green stripes. The flowers are scented. There are very short hairs on both the leaves and stems of the plant, only a fraction of a millimetre long. A scent is released if the stems are rubbed.

== Taxonomy ==
Albuca shawii was first described by John Gilbert Baker in 1874. The specific epithet shawii commemorates the collector, named by Baker only as "Dr Shaw", and identified elsewhere as the Scottish botanist John Shaw. Baker placed the species in a new series within the genus Albuca, Leptostyla, noting both its long, thin style and the sterile outer stamens.

Along with other species of Albuca, A. shawii has been placed in the genus Ornithogalum (as O. shawii), but molecular phylogenetic studies have supported the separation of the two genera. The species has been synonymized with Albuca tenuifolia, but this has been rejected.

== Distribution and habitat ==
Albuca shawii is native to southern Africa (the Cape Provinces, Lesotho, KwaZulu-Natal, the Free State and the Northern Provinces). It grows on cliffs and rocky grassland at elevations of 150–2400 m.

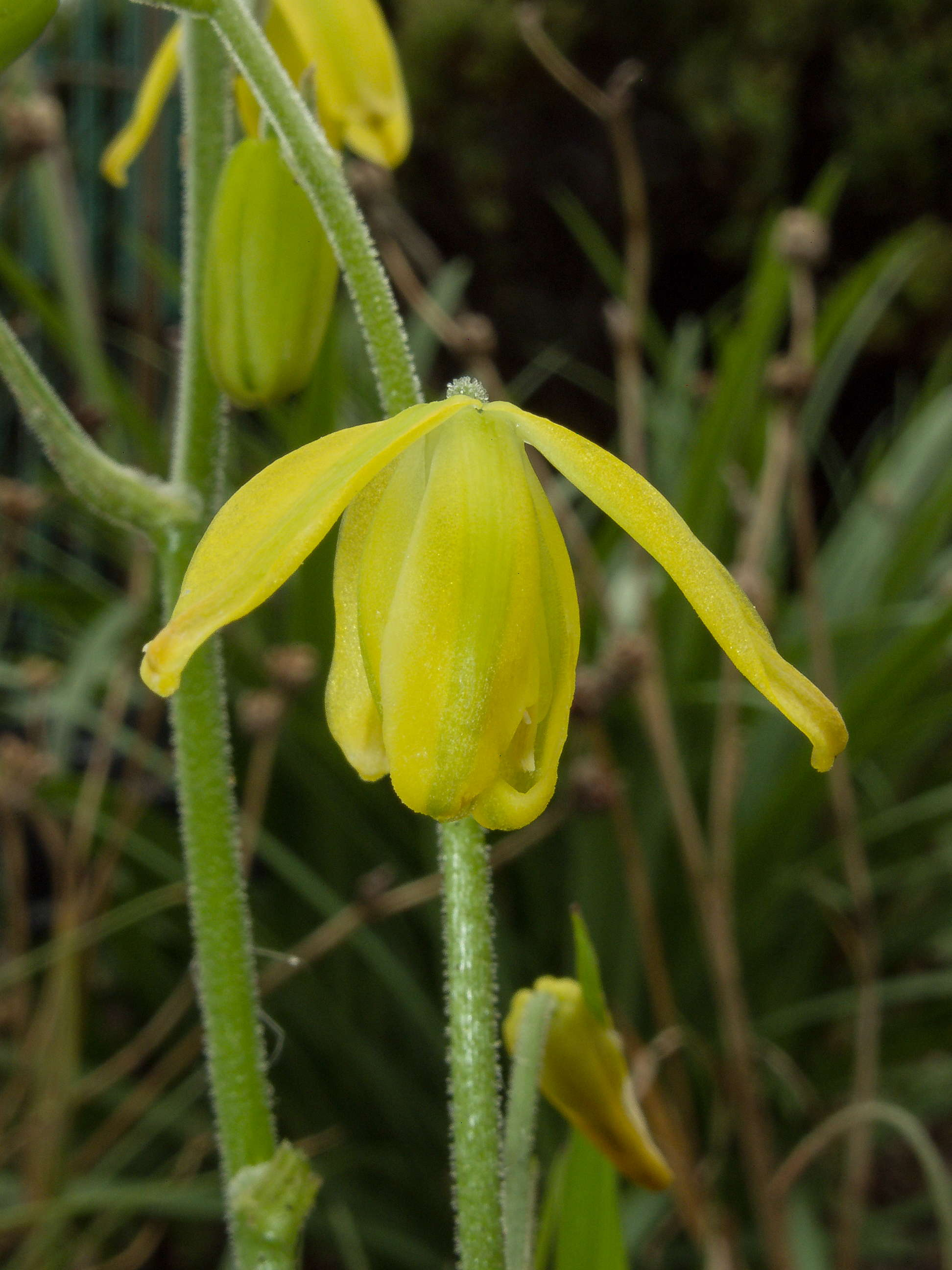
Closeup of the flower; in cultivation at the Birmingham Botanical Gardens (United Kingdom)
