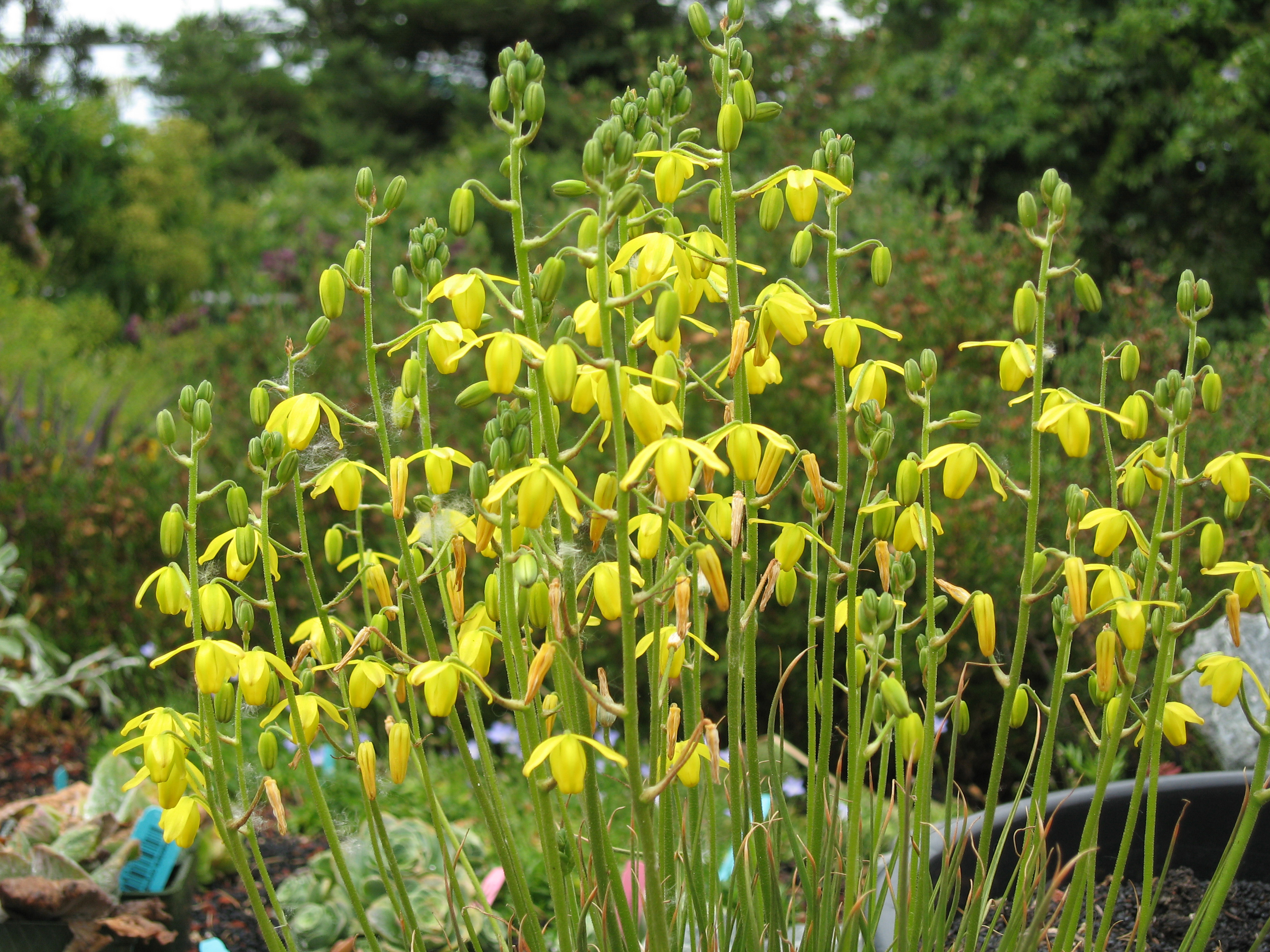
- Albuca shawii

Scientific classification
- Kingdom: Plantae
- Clade: Tracheophytes
- Clade: Angiosperms
- Clade: Monocots
- Order: Asparagales
- Family: Asparagaceae
- Subfamily: Scilloideae
- Genus: Albuca; L.

Synonyms
- Albugoides Medik.; Ardernia Salisb.; Battandiera Maire; Branciona Salisb.; Coilonox Raf.; Ethesia Raf.; Falconera Salisb.; Igidia Speta; Iosanthus Mart.-Azorín et al.; Monotassa Salisb.; Nemaulax Raf.; Osmyne Salisb.; Pallastema Salisb.; Stellarioides Medik.; Taeniola Salisb.; Trimelopter Raf.; Urophyllon Salisb.

= Albuca =

Genus of flowering plants

Albuca is a genus of flowering plants in the family Asparagaceae, subfamily Scilloideae. The genus is distributed mainly in southern and eastern Africa, with some species occurring in northern Africa and the Arabian Peninsula. Plants of the genus are known commonly as slime lilies.

== Description ==
These are perennial herbs growing from bulbs. The stem is sheathed in leaves with linear to strap-shaped blades. They can be 8 cm to well over 1 m long, and are flat or keeled. They are generally fleshy and sappy with a mucilaginous juice that inspired the common name "slime lilies". The flowers of some species are scented, especially at night. They are borne in racemes, usually slender, but flat-topped in some species. The flowers may be on stiff, or slender, nodding stalks, held erect or drooping. The six tepals are white to yellow, and each has a green or brown stripe down the centre. The outer three tepals spread open, while the inner three are connivent, curving inward so that the tips meet. There are six stamens, which have wings at the bases that wrap around the ovary at the centre of the flower. Some species have six fertile stamens, and in others the outer stamens are staminodes which do not produce pollen. The fruit is a rounded or oval three-lobed capsule containing shiny black seeds.

The three inner tepals can be closed firmly, raising the question of how pollinators might reach the stigma inside to deposit pollen. In a study of the interaction between pollinators and Albuca flowers, leafcutter bees were observed prying open the tepals and squeezing through to obtain the nectar inside. In the process, they left pollen on the tips of the tepals, where it absorbed fluid, germinated, and fertilized ovules. This was the first known case of flower petals performing the function of the stigma. The only thing even distantly similar is Lacandonia schismatica where the pollen tube travels down the stamen, across the base and up the pistils to pollinate from below.

== Systematics ==
The genus is circumscribed in two ways. The traditional genus Albuca is a monophyletic group of about 60 known species, and possibly about 100 in total. Other authorities have considered Albuca in a wider sense, including such genera as Stellarioides, Coilonox, Trimelopter, and Battandiera, with a total of 110 to 180 very heterogeneous species; All of these genera, including Albuca, have also been lumped together in Ornithogalum at times, but molecular phylogenetics studies support their separation.

=== Species ===
The genus, as defined in the Plants of the World Online database, contains 167 accepted species as of July 2025.

- Albuca abyssinica Jacq. – Tropical & S. Africa, S.W. Arabian Peninsula
- Albuca acuminata Baker – Namibia to W. Cape Province
- Albuca adlami Baker – Northern Province
- Albuca albucoides (Aiton) J.C.Manning & Goldblatt – S.W. Cape Province
- Albuca amboensis (Schinz) Oberm. – Namibia to Botswana
- Albuca amoena (Batt.) J.C.Manning & Goldblatt – N.W. Sahara
- Albuca anisocrispa Mart.-Azorín & M.B.Crespo – E. Cape Province
- Albuca annulata Mart.-Azorín & M.B.Crespo – Eastern Cape Province
- Albuca arenosa J.C.Manning & Goldblatt – W. Cape Province
- Albuca aurea Jacq. – S.W. Cape Province
- Albuca autumnula (U.Müll.-Doblies & D.Müll.-Doblies) J.C.Manning & Goldblatt – S.W. Cape Province
- Albuca bakeri Mart.-Azorín & M.B.Crespo – S. Cape Province
- Albuca barbata (Jacq.) J.C.Manning & Goldblatt – Cape Province
- Albuca batteniana Hilliard & B.L.Burtt – S. Cape Province – wild coast albuca
- Albuca bifolia Baker – S. Cape Province
- Albuca bifoliata R.A.Dyer – S. Cape Province
- Albuca boucheri U.Müll.-Doblies – S.W. Cape Province
- Albuca bracteata (Thunb.) J.C.Manning & Goldblatt – E. Cape Province to KwaZulu-Natal
- Albuca bruce-bayeri U.Müll.-Doblies – Cape Province
- Albuca buchananii Baker – S. Tropical Africa
- Albuca buffelspoortensis van Jaarsv. – Western Cape
- Albuca canadensis (L.) F.M.Leight. – Cape Province
- Albuca candida (Oberm.) J.C.Manning & Goldblatt – Namibia
- Albuca caudata Jacq. – S.E. Cape Province
- Albuca chartacea (Mart.-Azorín, M.B.Crespo & A.P.Dold) J.C.Manning & Goldblatt – Eastern Cape Province
- Albuca chlorantha Welw. ex Baker – Angola
- Albuca ciliaris U.Müll.-Doblies – W. Cape Province
- Albuca clanwilliamae-gloria U.Müll.-Doblies – W. Cape Province
- Albuca collina Baker – S. Cape Province
- Albuca concordiana Baker – Namibia to Cape Province
- Albuca consanguinea (Kunth) J.C.Manning & Goldblatt – S.W. Cape Province
- Albuca cooperi Baker – S.W. Cape Province
- Albuca corymbosa Baker – S. Cape Province
- Albuca costatula (U.Müll.-Doblies & D.Müll.-Doblies) J.C.Manning & Goldblatt – Namibia
- Albuca craibii (Mart.-Azorín, M.B.Crespo & A.P.Dold) J.C.Manning & Goldblatt – North-West Province
- Albuca cremnophila van Jaarsv. & A.E.van Wyk – S. Cape Province
- Albuca crinifolia Baker – KwaZulu-Natal
- Albuca crispa J.C.Manning & Goldblatt – S. Cape Province to Free state
- Albuca crudenii Archibald – S. Cape Province
- Albuca dalyae Baker – S. Cape Province
- Albuca darlingana U.Müll.-Doblies – S.W. Cape Province
- Albuca deaconii van Jaarsv. – KwaZulu-Natal
- Albuca decipiens U.Müll.-Doblies – W. Cape Province
- Albuca deserticola J.C.Manning & Goldblatt – Namibia to N.W. Cape Province
- Albuca dilucula (Oberm.) J.C.Manning & Goldblatt – Cape Province
- Albuca dinteri U.Müll.-Doblies – Namibia
- Albuca donaldsonii Rendle – Ethiopia to Tanzania
- Albuca dyeri (Poelln.) J.C.Manning & Goldblatt – Cape Province
- Albuca echinosperma U.Müll.-Doblies – S.W. Cape Province
- Albuca engleriana K.Krause & Dinter – Namibia
- Albuca etesiogaripensis U.Müll.-Doblies – Namibia to N.W. Cape Province
- Albuca exigua (Mart.-Azorín, M.B.Crespo, A.P.Dold, M.Pinter & Wetschnig) J.C.Manning – Eastern Cape
- Albuca fastigiata Dryand. – S. Cape Province
- Albuca fibrotunicata Gledhill & Oyewole – Niger to Cameroon
- Albuca flaccida Jacq. – S.W. Cape Province
- Albuca foetida U.Müll.-Doblies – S.W. Cape Province
- Albuca fragrans Jacq. – S.W. Cape Province
- Albuca gageoides K.Krause – Namibia
- Albuca galeata Welw. ex Baker – Angola
- Albuca gariepensis J.C.Manning & Goldblatt – N. Cape Province
- Albuca gentilii De Wild. – Zaïre
- Albuca gethylloides (U.Müll.-Doblies & D.Müll.-Doblies) J.C.Manning & Goldblatt – W. Cape Province
- Albuca gildenhuysii (van Jaarsv.) van Jaarsv. - N.W. Cape Province
- Albuca glandulifera J.C.Manning & Goldblatt – Namibia to N.W. Cape Province
- Albuca glandulosa Baker – Cape Province
- Albuca glauca Baker – Northern Province
- Albuca glaucifolia (U.Müll.-Doblies & D.Müll.-Doblies) J.C.Manning & Goldblatt – W. Cape Province
- Albuca goswinii U.Müll.-Doblies – S.W. Cape Province
- Albuca grandiflora (Baker) Mart.-Azorín, M.B.Crespo & M.Á.Alonso – NE Sudan
- Albuca grandis J.C.Manning & Goldblatt – Western Cape Province
- Albuca hallii U.Müll.-Doblies – Namibia to W. Cape Province
- Albuca hereroensis Schinz – Namibia
- Albuca hesquaspoortensis U.Müll.-Doblies – S.W. Cape Province
- Albuca heydenrychii van Jaarsv. – Limpopo Province
- Albuca homblei De Wild. – Zaïre
- Albuca humilis Baker – Free State to KwaZulu-Natal
- Albuca juncifolia Baker – S.W. Cape Province
- Albuca karachabpoortensis (U.Müll.-Doblies & D.Müll.-Doblies) J.C.Manning & Goldblatt – W. Cape Province
- Albuca karasbergensis Glover – Namibia
- Albuca karooica U.Müll.-Doblies – Namibia to Cape Province
- Albuca katangensis De Wild. – S. Zaïre
- Albuca kirkii (Baker) Brenan – Kenya to S. Tropical Africa
- Albuca kirstenii (J.C.Manning & Goldblatt) J.C.Manning & Goldblatt – S.W. Cape Province
- Albuca knersvlaktensis (U.Müll.-Doblies & D.Müll.-Doblies) J.C.Manning & Goldblatt – S.W. Cape Province
- Albuca kundelungensis De Wild. – Zaïre
- Albuca lebaensis (van Jaarsv.) J.C.Manning & Goldblatt – Angola
- Albuca leucantha U.Müll.-Doblies – N.W. Cape Province
- Albuca littoralis (N.R.Crouch, D.Styles, A.J.Beaumont & Mart.-Azorín) J.C.Manning – KwaZulu-Natal
- Albuca longipes Baker – Cape Province
- Albuca macowanii Baker – S. Cape Province
- Albuca malangensis Baker – Angola
- Albuca massonii Baker – W. Cape Province
- Albuca monarchos (U.Müll.-Doblies & D.Müll.-Doblies) J.C.Manning & Goldblatt – W. Cape Province
- Albuca monophylla Baker – Angola to Namibia
- Albuca myogaloides Welw. ex Baker – Angola
- Albuca namaquensis Baker – Namibia to Cape Province
- Albuca nana Schönland – S. Cape Province
- Albuca nathoana (U.Müll.-Doblies & D.Müll.-Doblies) J.C.Manning & Goldblatt – W. Cape Province
- Albuca navicula U.Müll.-Doblies – W. Cape Province
- Albuca nelsonii N.E.Br. – E. Cape Province to KwaZulu-Natal – Nelson's slime lily
- Albuca nigritana (Baker) Troupin – W. Tropical Africa to Rwanda
- Albuca obtusa J.C.Manning & Goldblatt – W. Cape Province
- Albuca orientalis van Jaarsv. – Eastern and Western Cape Provinces
- Albuca osmynella (U.Müll.-Doblies & D.Müll.-Doblies) J.C.Manning & Goldblatt – W. Cape Province
- Albuca ovata (Thunb.) J.C.Manning & Goldblatt – Cape Province
- Albuca papyracea J.C.Manning & Goldblatt – Cape Province
- Albuca paradoxa Dinter – Namibia to W. Cape Province
- Albuca paucifolia (U.Müll.-Doblies & D.Müll.-Doblies) J.C.Manning & Goldblatt – Cape Province
- Albuca pearsonii (F.M.Leight.) J.C.Manning & Goldblatt – Namibia to N.W. Cape Province
- Albuca pendula B.Mathew – S.W. Saudi Arabia
- Albuca pendulina (U.Müll.-Doblies & D.Müll.-Doblies) J.C.Manning & Goldblatt – Namibia
- Albuca pentheri (Zahlbr.) J.C.Manning & Goldblatt – Cape Province
- Albuca polyodontula (U.Müll.-Doblies & D.Müll.-Doblies) J.C.Manning & Goldblatt – Namibia
- Albuca polyphylla Baker – S. Cape Province
- Albuca prasina (Ker Gawl.) J.C.Manning & Goldblatt – S. Africa
- Albuca prolifera J.H.Wilson – S. Cape Province
- Albuca psammophora (U.Müll.-Doblies & D.Müll.-Doblies) J.C.Manning & Goldblatt – W. Cape Province
- Albuca pseudobifolia Mart.-Azorín & M.B.Crespo – Eastern Cape Province
- Albuca pulchra (Schinz) J.C.Manning & Goldblatt – Angola to Botswana
- Albuca rautanenii (Schinz) J.C.Manning & Goldblatt – Namibia
- Albuca recurva (Oberm.) J.C.Manning & Goldblatt – Namibia
- Albuca riebeekkasteelberganula U.Müll.-Doblies – S.W. Cape Province
- Albuca robertsoniana U.Müll.-Doblies – S.W. Cape Province
- Albuca rogersii Schönland – S. Cape Province
- Albuca roodeae (E.Phillips) J.C.Manning & Goldblatt – Cape Province
- Albuca rupestris Hilliard & B.L.Burtt – KwaZulu-Natal
- Albuca sabulosa (U.Müll.-Doblies & D.Müll.-Doblies) J.C.Manning & Goldblatt – Cape Province
- Albuca scabrocostata (U.Müll.-Doblies & D.Müll.-Doblies) J.C.Manning & Goldblatt – W. Cape Province
- Albuca scabromarginata De Wild. – Zaïre
- Albuca schinzii Baker – Namibia
- Albuca schlechteri Baker – Northern Cape Province
- Albuca schoenlandii Baker – S. Cape Province
- Albuca secunda (Jacq.) J.C.Manning & Goldblatt – Cape Province
- Albuca seineri (Engl. & K.Krause) J.C.Manning & Goldblatt – S. Africa
- Albuca semipedalis Baker – Cape Province
- Albuca setosa Jacq. – Cape Province to KwaZulu-Natal
- Albuca shawii Baker – S. Africa
- Albuca somersetianum – S. Cape Province
- Albuca spiralis L.f. – W. Cape Province
- Albuca stapffii (Schinz) J.C.Manning & Goldblatt – Namibia
- Albuca steudneri Schweinf. & Engl. – E. Sudan
- Albuca strigosula (U.Müll.-Doblies & D.Müll.-Doblies) J.C.Manning & Goldblatt – Namibia
- Albuca stuetzeliana (U.Müll.-Doblies & D.Müll.-Doblies) J.C.Manning & Goldblatt – Namibia to N.W. Cape Province
- Albuca suaveolens (Jacq.) J.C.Manning & Goldblatt – Namibia to Cape Province
- Albuca subglandulosa (U.Müll.-Doblies & D.Müll.-Doblies) J.C.Manning & Goldblatt – W. Cape Province
- Albuca subspicata Baker – Angola
- Albuca sudanica A.Chev. – W. Tropical Africa to Sahara and W. Sudan
- Albuca tenuifolia Baker – S. Cape Province
- Albuca tenuis Knudtzon – Central Ethiopia to Kenya
- Albuca thermarum van Jaarsv. – Cape Province
- Albuca tortuosa Baker – E. Cape Province
- Albuca trachyphylla U.Müll.-Doblies – N.W. Cape Province
- Albuca tubiformis (Oberm.) J.C.Manning & Goldblatt – Namibia
- Albuca unifolia (Retz.) J.C.Manning & Goldblatt – Namibia to Free State
- Albuca unifoliata G.D.Rowley – W. Cape Province
- Albuca variegata De Wild. – Zaïre
- Albuca villosa U.Müll.-Doblies – S.W. Namibia to W. Cape Province
- Albuca virens (Lindl.) J.C.Manning & Goldblatt – Eritrea to S. Africa
- Albuca viscosa L.f. – Namibia to W. Cape Province
- Albuca vittata Ker Gawl. – Cape Province
- Albuca volubilis (H.Perrier) J.C.Manning & Goldblatt – W. Madagascar
- Albuca watermeyeri (L.Bolus) J.C.Manning & Goldblatt – Cape Province
- Albuca weberlingiorum U.Müll.-Doblies – Cape Province
- Albuca xanthocodon Hilliard & B.L.Burtt – Mpumalanga to S.E. Cape Province
- Albuca yerburyi Ridl. – Yemen
- Albuca zebrina Baker – W. Cape Province
- Albuca zenkeri Engl. – Cameroon

== Cultivation ==
The most popular species is Albuca nelsonii, which is evergreen and not frost-hardy. Such species are best suited to temperate areas, but can be grown in a conservatory or greenhouse, or in a sheltered position if light frosts might occur. However, some other species from alpine or Karoo-like areas are fairly frost-resistant and may be deciduous, and accordingly can stand a good deal of frost once established. Some are winter-flowering. As a rule they do well in full sun in light, free-draining soil. Propagation is from offsets or seed.
