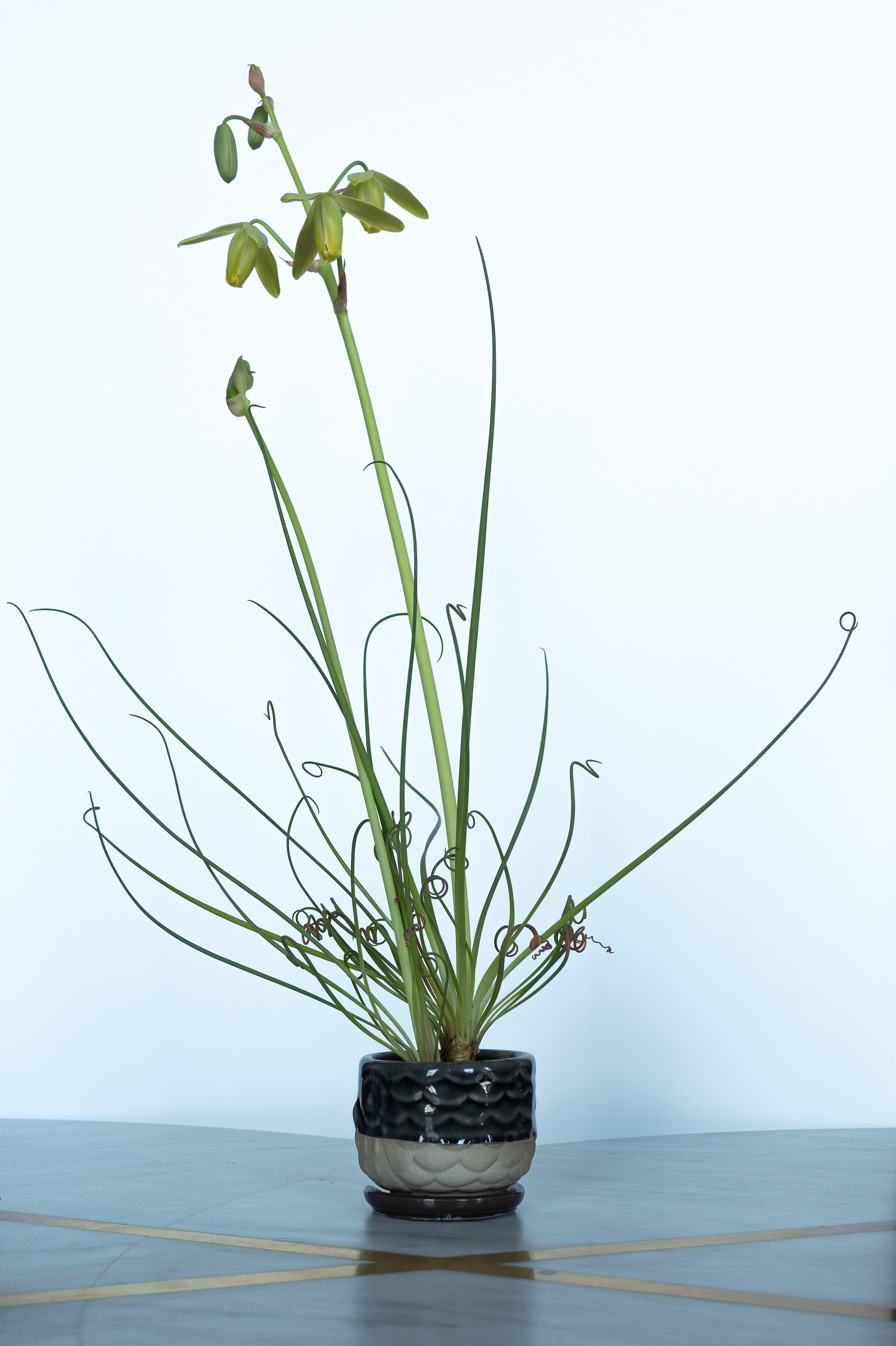
- Albuca spiralis "Frizzle Sizzle" cultivar

Scientific classification
- Kingdom: Plantae
- Clade: Embryophytes
- Clade: Tracheophytes
- Clade: Spermatophytes
- Clade: Angiosperms
- Clade: Monocots
- Order: Asparagales
- Family: Asparagaceae
- Subfamily: Scilloideae
- Genus: Albuca
- Species: A. spiralis

Binomial name
- Albuca spiralis L.f.

= Albuca spiralis =

Corkscrew albuca

Species of flowering plant

Albuca spiralis, commonly called the corkscrew albuca or frizzle sizzle, is a species of flowering plant in the family Asparagaceae, that is native to Western and Northern Cape Provinces, South Africa.

== Description ==
The plant has narrow leaves that curve, forming a spiral. They are sometimes tipped with glandular hairs, but are not sticky (unlike those of the similar species, Albuca viscosa).

The plant bears nodding green flowers with pale yellow margins. The flowers are sweetly scented, with an aroma like that of vanilla.

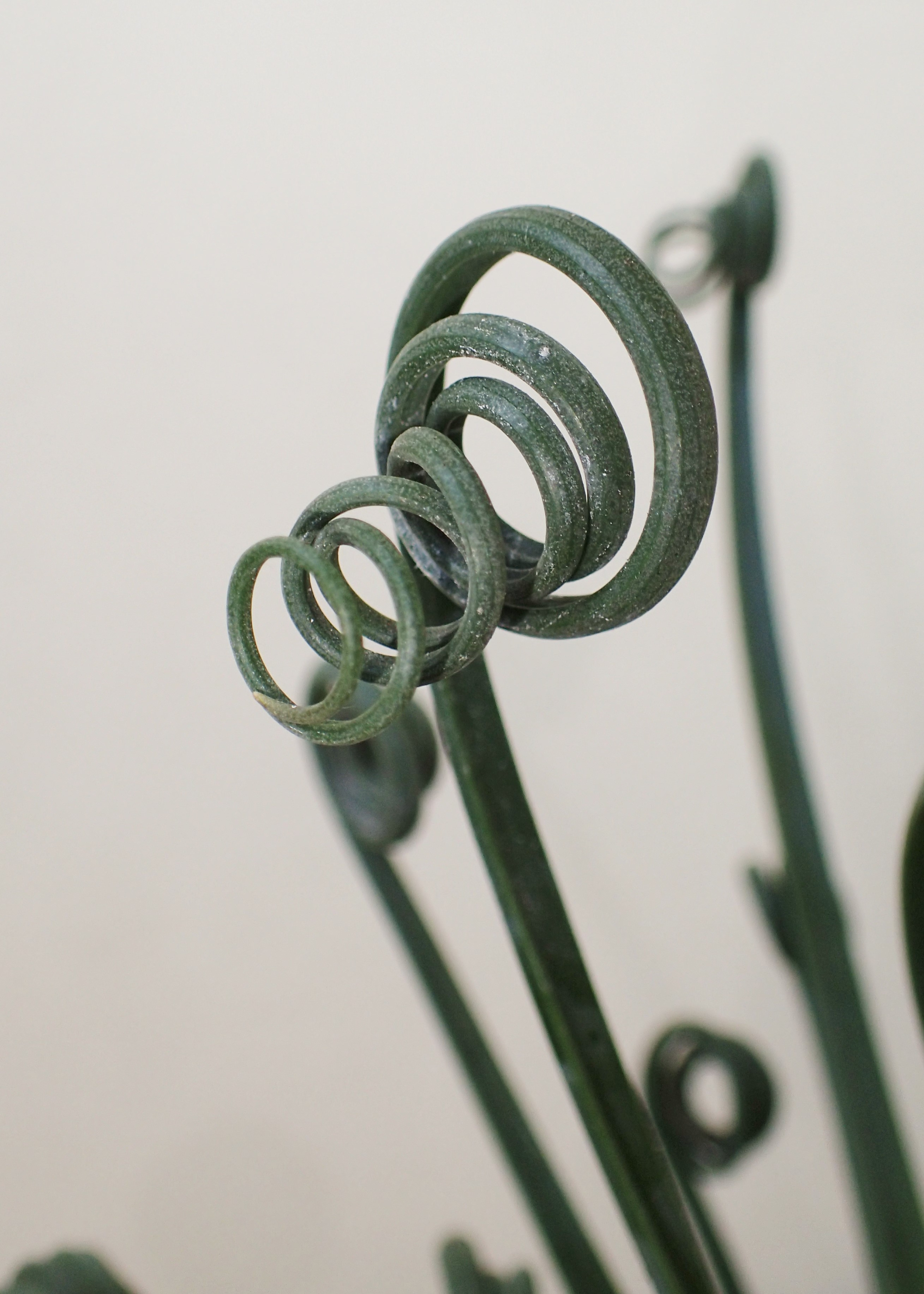
The leaves of Albuca spiralis are curved into spirals, and usually smooth (or only slightly glandular)

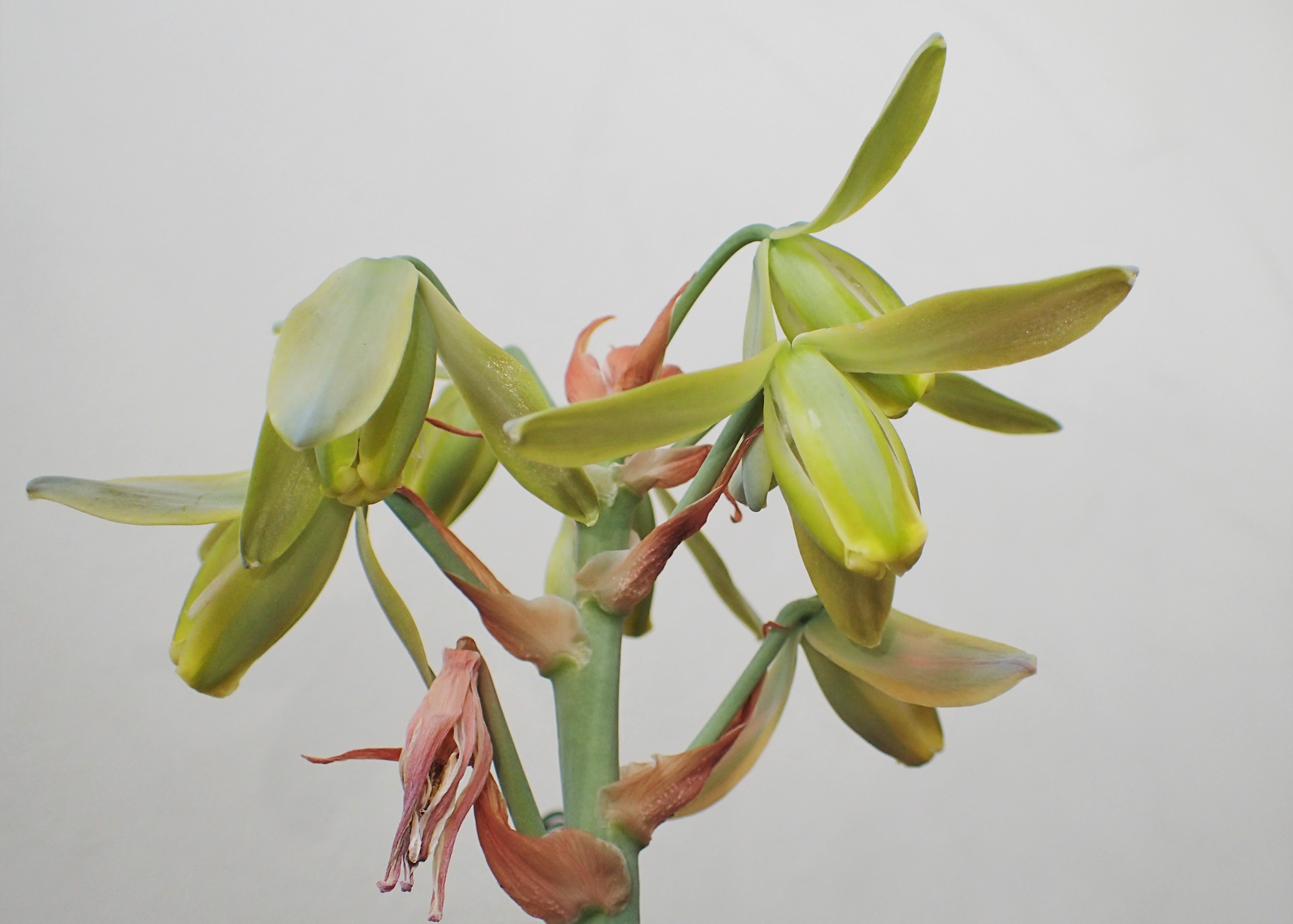
The flowers of Albuca spiralis are yellow-green and drooping
