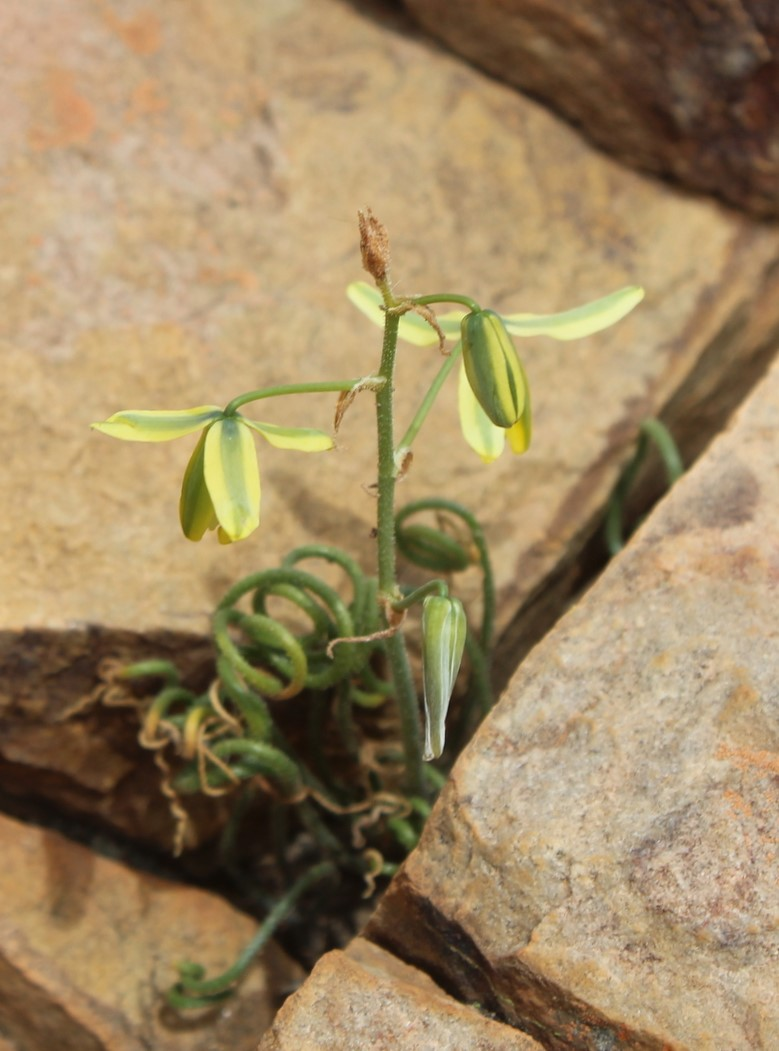

Scientific classification
- Kingdom: Plantae
- Clade: Tracheophytes
- Clade: Angiosperms
- Clade: Monocots
- Order: Asparagales
- Family: Asparagaceae
- Subfamily: Scilloideae
- Genus: Albuca
- Species: A. viscosa

Binomial name
- Albuca viscosa L.f.

= Albuca viscosa =

Species of plant

Albuca viscosa, commonly called the sticky albuca, is a species of flowering plant in the family Asparagaceae, that is native to Western and Northern Cape Provinces, South Africa.

== Description ==
A small geophyte, with an oval, sometimes faintly pinkish bulb. The bulb tunics are wrinkled and dry towards the top. The plant has subterete leaves that often spiral towards their tips. The leaves and peduncle are glandular hairy and sticky (viscous). The flowers are drooping, and the petals are yellow with green central stripes.

=== Related species ===
It is frequently confused with the similar looking Albuca spiralis and Albuca concordiana, as all three tend to have leaves that spiral. However, the leaves of A. viscosa are more sticky ("viscous") causing sand to adhere to them in habitat. They are also not clasping below.

The leaves of A. spiralis are smooth, or less viscous, and they are clasping the stem below.

The leaves of A. concordiana are flat and strap-shaped, rather than subterete.

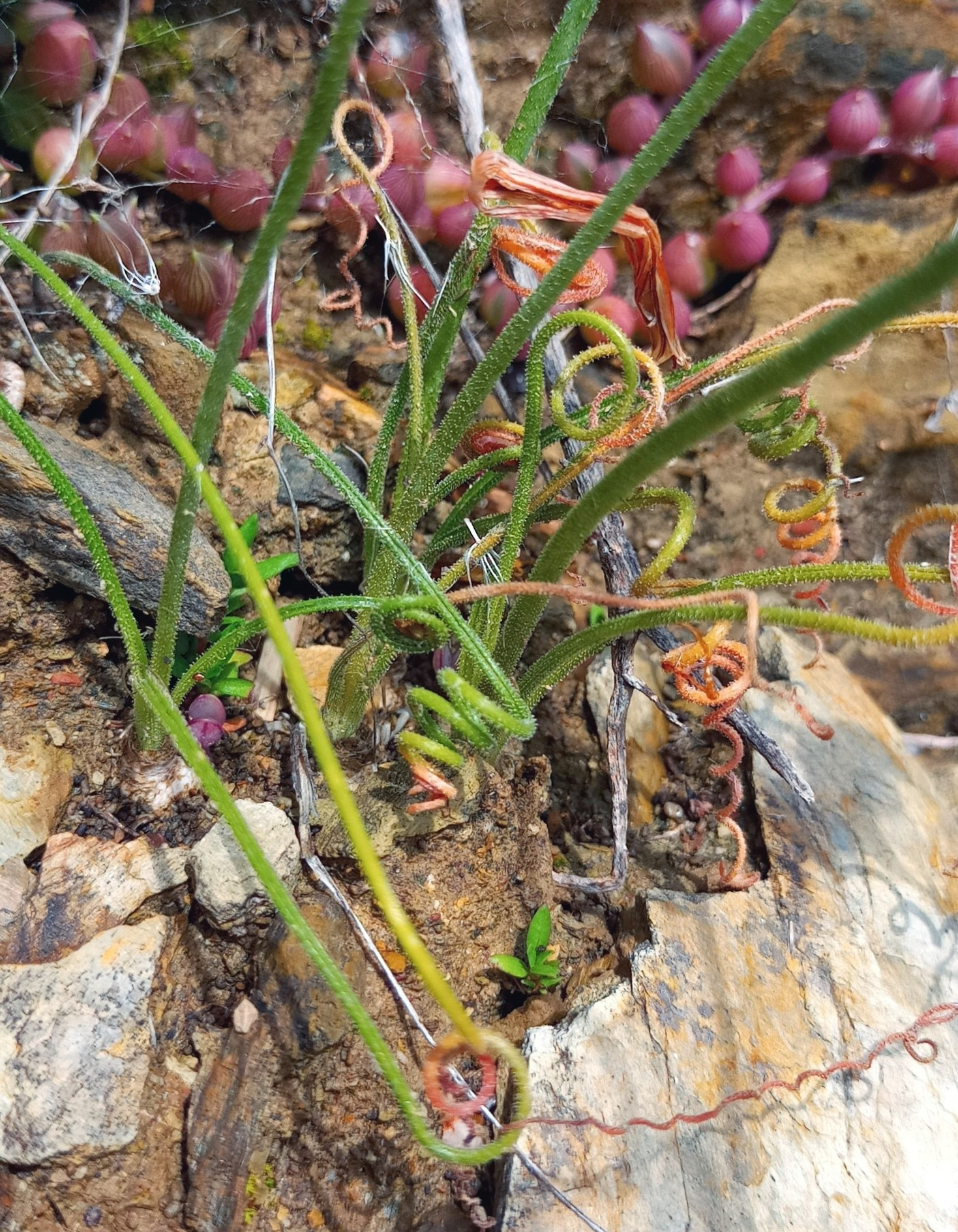
The leaves of Albuca viscosa are sticky ("viscous")

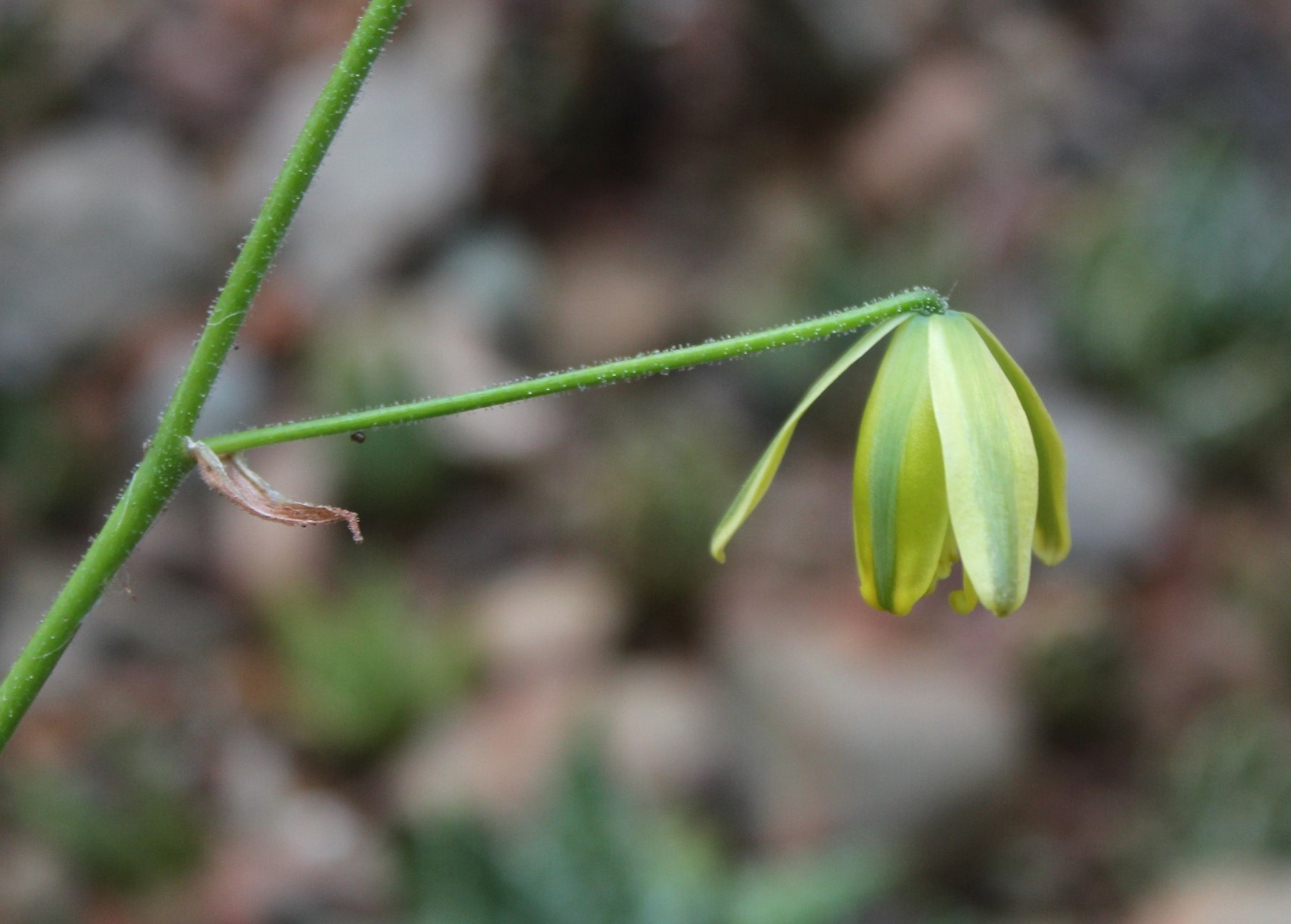
The flowers of Albuca viscosa are yellow-green and drooping
