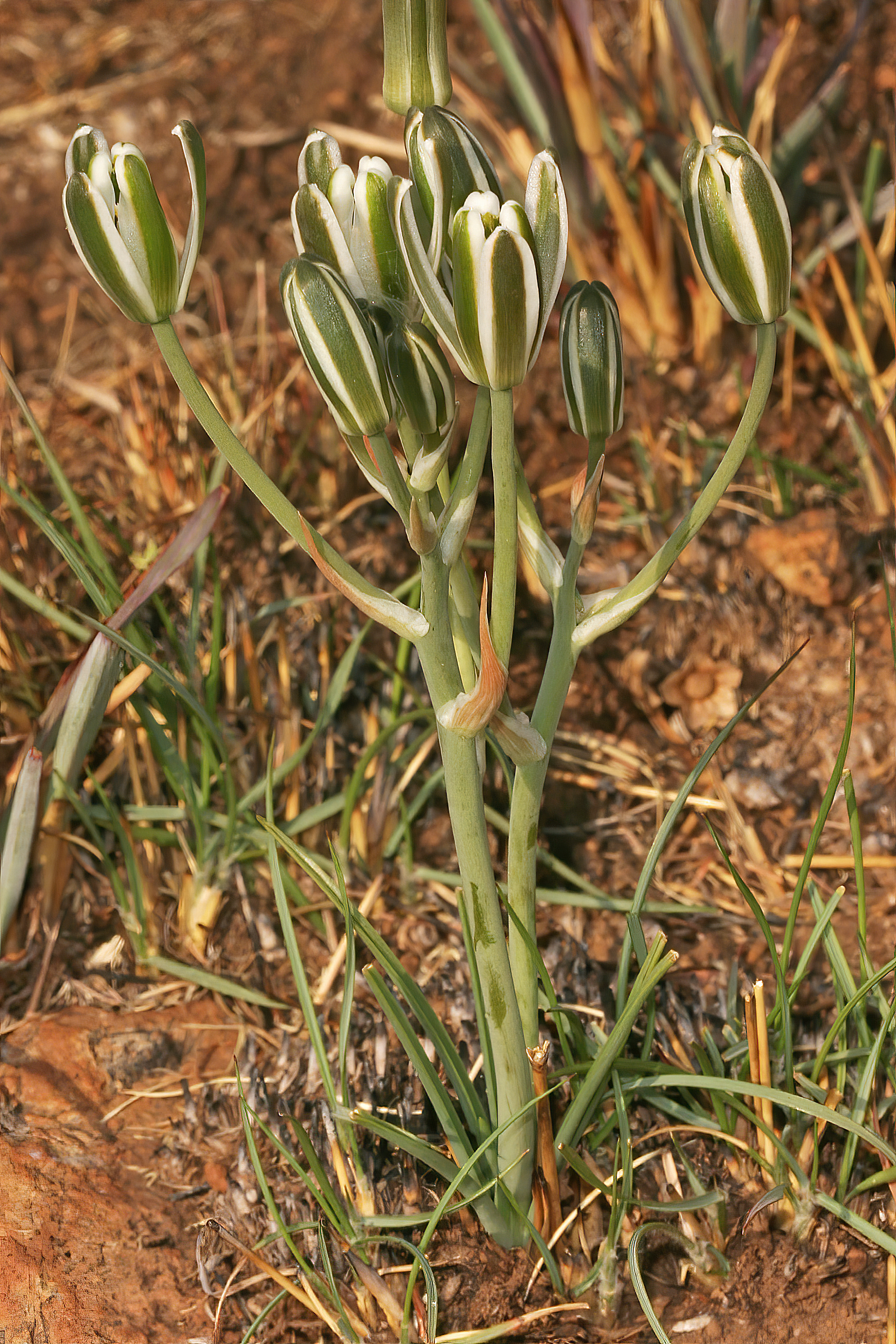
- The flowers of Albuca setosa are held erect, and the tepals have thick dark central lines

Scientific classification
- Kingdom: Plantae
- Clade: Tracheophytes
- Clade: Angiosperms
- Clade: Monocots
- Order: Asparagales
- Family: Asparagaceae
- Subfamily: Scilloideae
- Genus: Albuca
- Species: A. setosa

Binomial name
- Albuca setosa Jacq. (1797)

Synonyms
- Albuca affinis J.M.Wood & M.S.Evans (1899); Albuca baurii Baker (1897); Albuca pachychlamys Baker (1897); Albuca patersoniae Schönland (1910); Branciona setosa (Jacq.) Salisb. (1866), not validly publ.; Ornithogalum setosum (Jacq.) J.C.Manning & Goldblatt (2003 publk. 2004)

= Albuca setosa =

Species of plant

Albuca setosa is a species of small, perennial, bulbous plant in the asparagus family. It is native to the Cape Provinces and KwaZulu-Natal in South Africa.

== Description ==
The bulb of Albuca setosa is globose and has a course fibre collar at its top, made from the persistent remnants of the leaf-tunics. These appear as rough brown hairs around the base of the plant's rosette.

The dark green leaves are smooth and only very faintly succulent. Their shape is linear-to-lanceolate; often wider at the base and tapering/acuminate towards the tip. Sometimes they can desiccate in the summer when the flowers appear.

The compact peduncle terminates in a lax raceme. The flowers are held erect, on long stalks, with small ovate lanceolate bracts. Their colour can be yellow or white, with thick darker central lines. The flowers appear in Spring and early Summer.

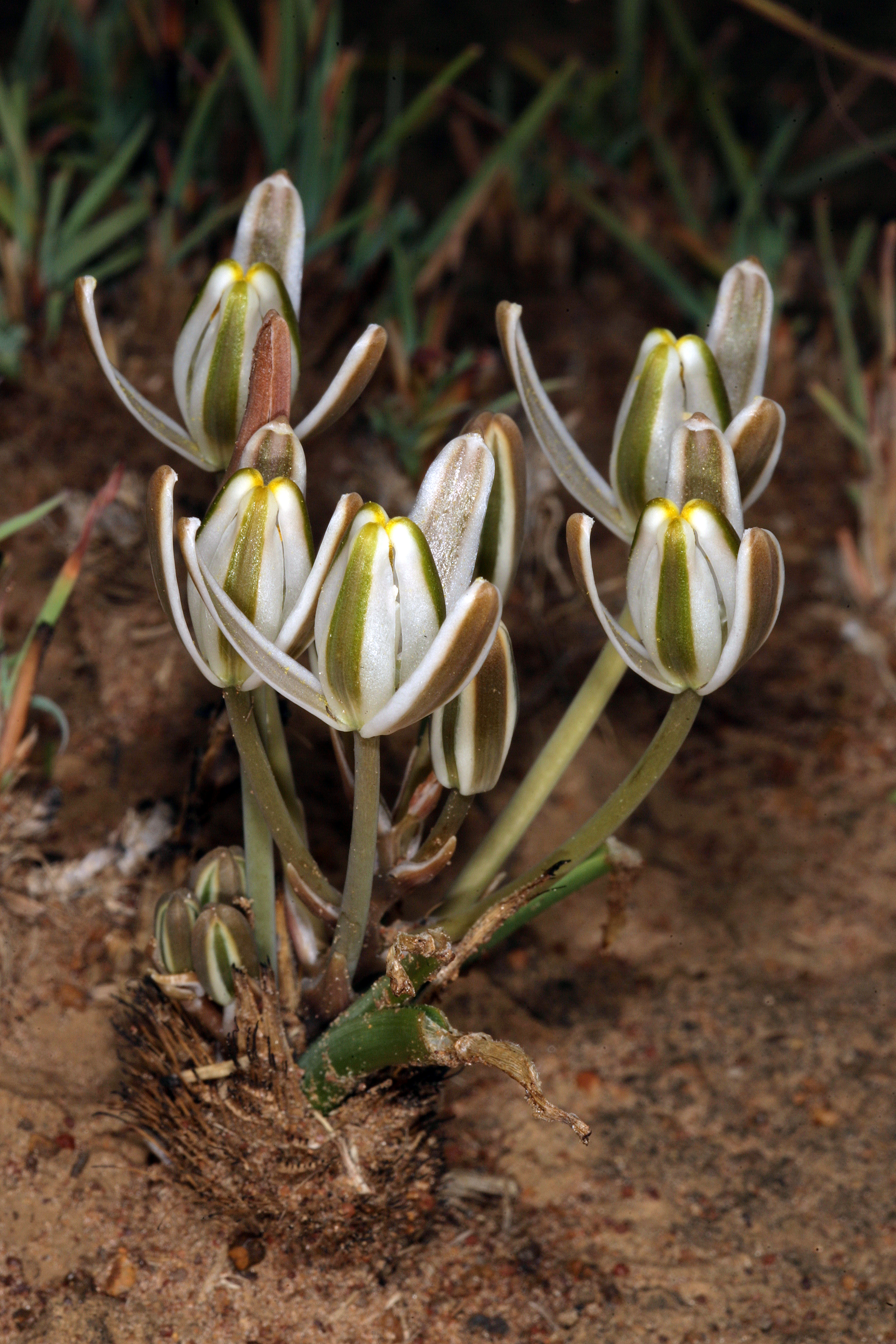
Image showing the coarse sheath of brown fibres around the base of the plant's rosette

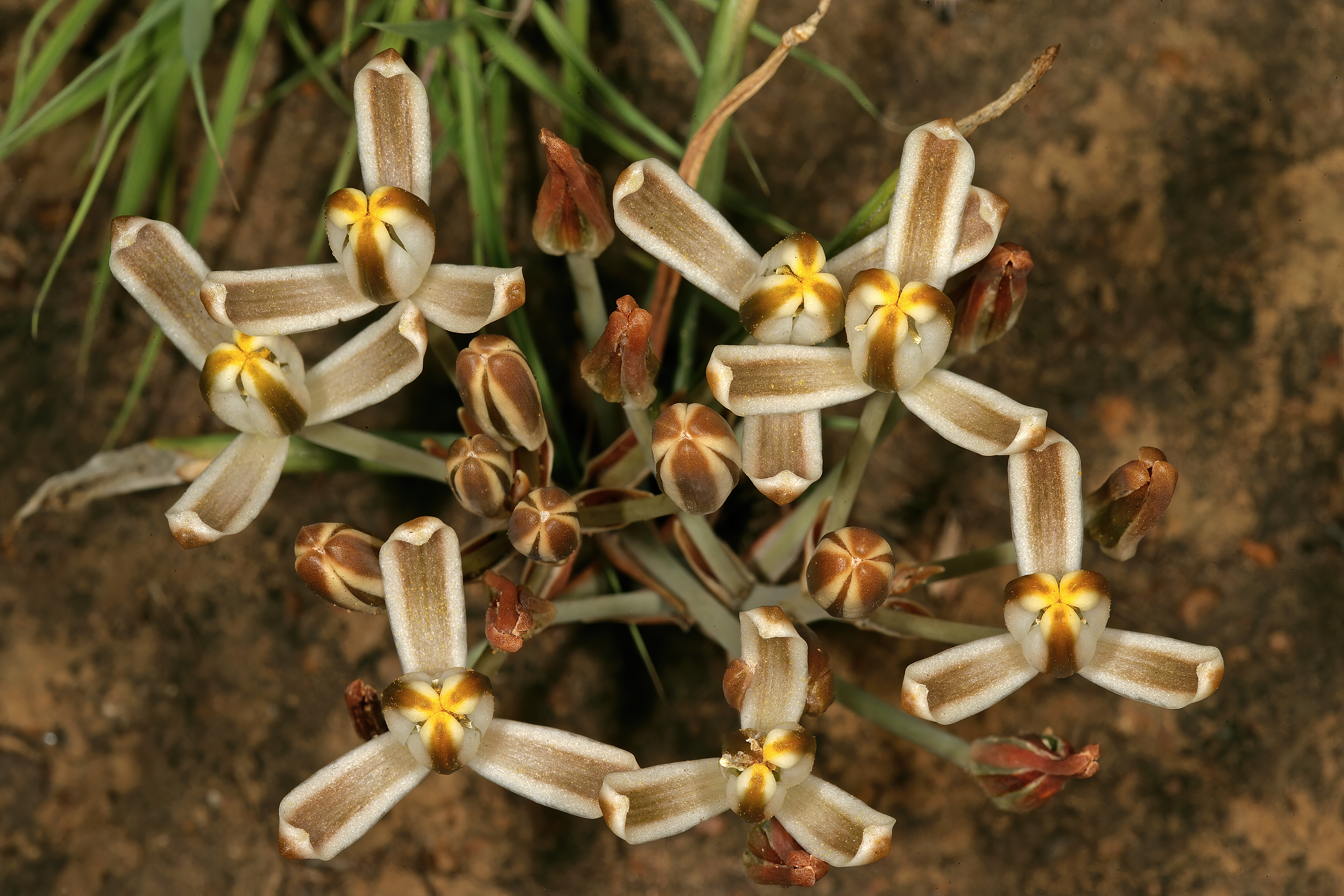
The inner tepals often have yellow tips

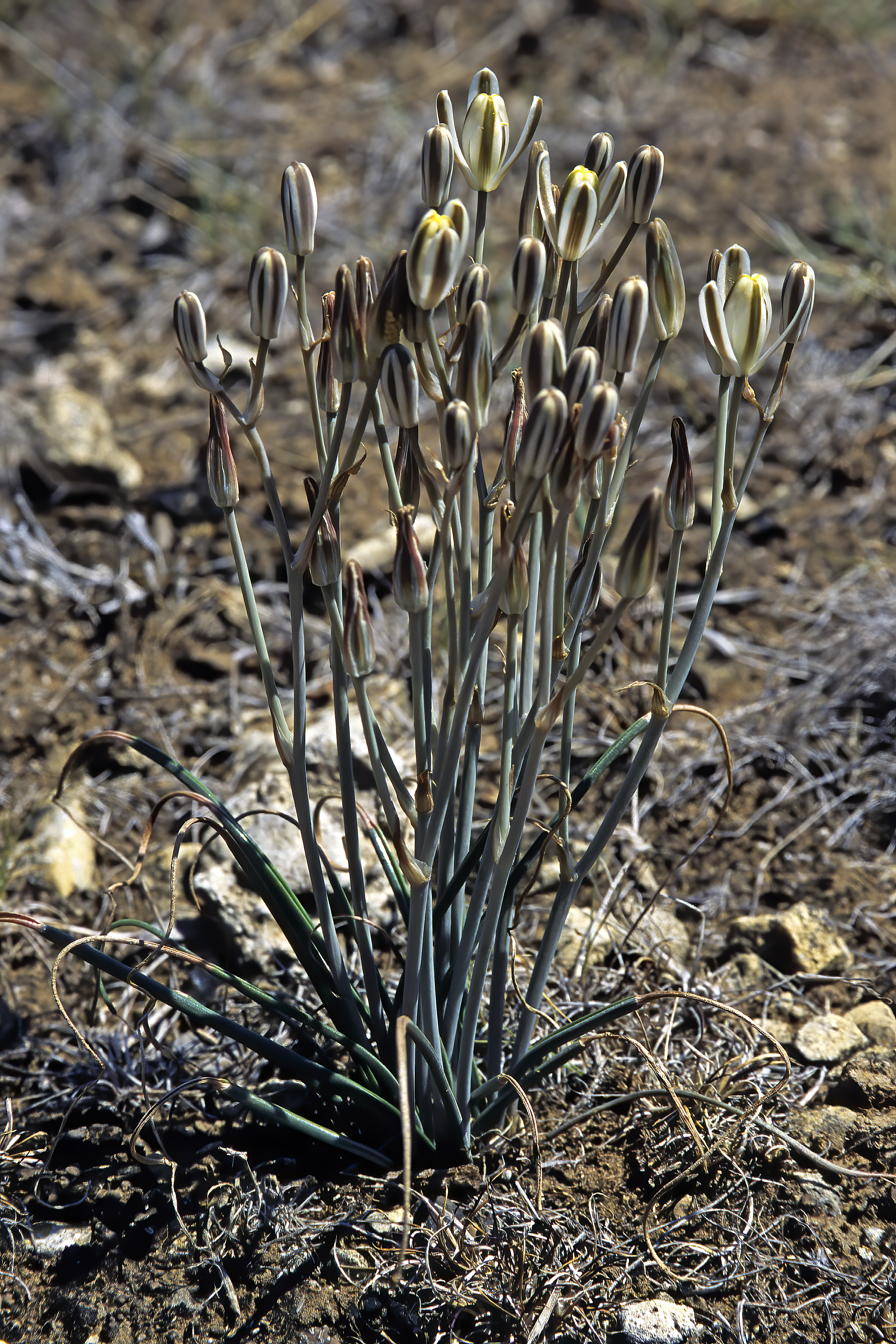
View of the leaves

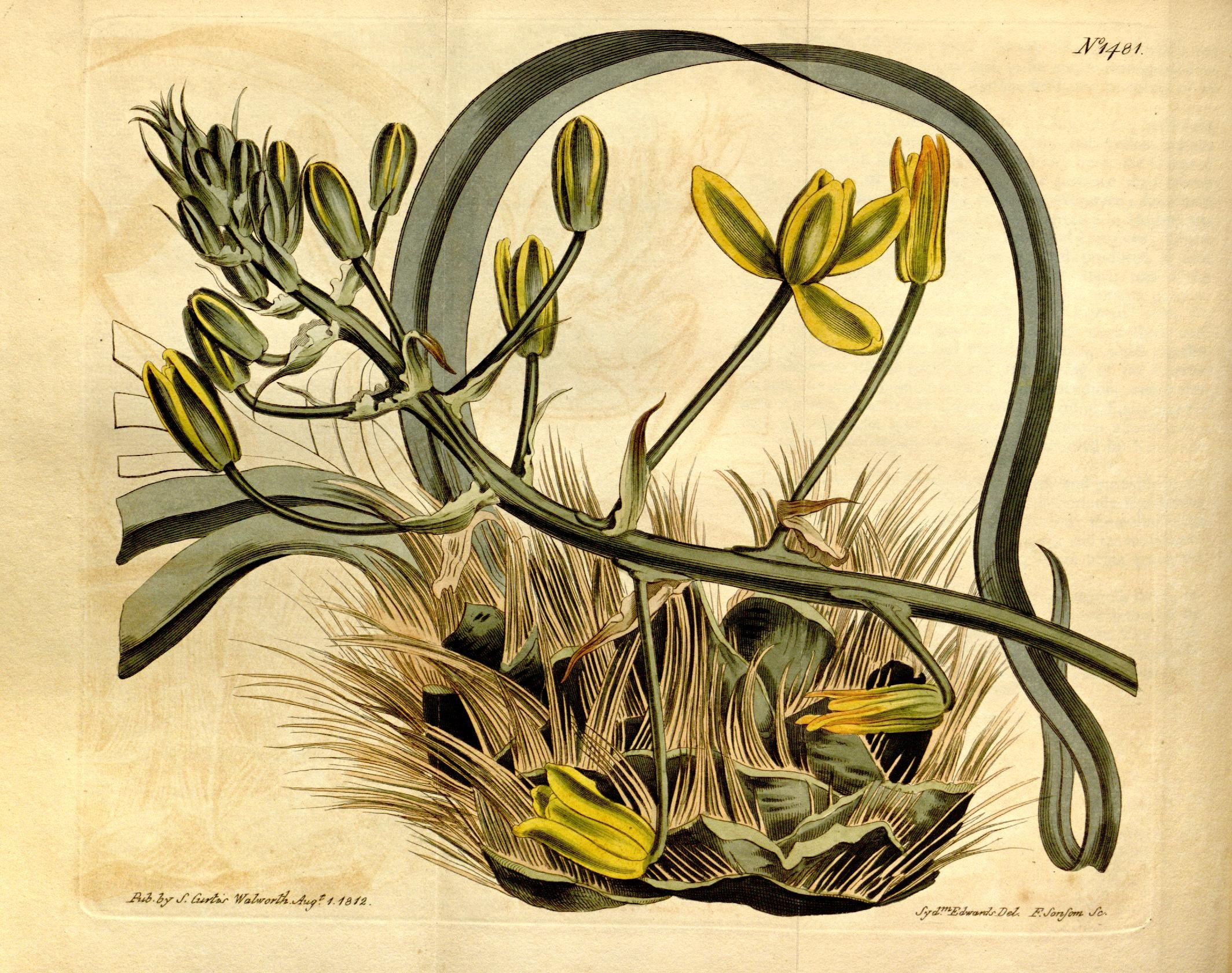
Botanical illustration (1811-1812).
