= Heaviside condition =

Optimal condition for a hypothetical transmission line

A transmission line which meets the Heaviside condition, named for Oliver Heaviside (1850–1925), and certain other conditions can transmit signals without dispersion and without distortion. The importance of the Heaviside condition is that it showed the possibility of dispersionless transmission of telegraph signals.In some cases, the performance of a transmission line can be improved by adding inductive loading to the cable.

== The condition ==
Heaviside's model of a transmission line.

A transmission line can be represented as a distributed-element model of its primary line constants as shown in the figure. The primary constants are the electrical properties of the cable per unit length and are: capacitance C (in farads per meter), inductance L (in henries per meter), series resistance R (in ohms per meter), and shunt conductance G (in siemens per meter).

The Heaviside condition is satisfied when :$\frac{G}{C} = \frac{R}{L}.$

The series resistance and shunt conductivity cause losses in the line. For an ideal transmission line, $\scriptstyle R=G=0$. An ideal line trivially meets the Heaviside condition.

== Background ==
A signal on a transmission line can become distorted even if the line constants, and the resulting transmission function, are all perfectly linear. There are two mechanisms: firstly, the attenuation of the line can vary with frequency which results in a change to the shape of a pulse transmitted down the line. Secondly, and usually more problematically, distortion is caused by a frequency dependence on phase velocity of the transmitted signal frequency components. If different frequency components of the signal are transmitted at different velocities the signal becomes "smeared out" in space and time, a form of distortion called dispersion.

A transmission line is dispersionless, if the velocity of signals is independent of frequency. Mathematically $\frac {d} {d \omega} v = 0$.

A transmission line is distortionless if it is dispersionless and the attenuation coefficient is independent of frequency. Mathematically $\frac {d} {d \omega} \alpha = 0$.

Dispersion of telegraph pulses, if severe enough, will cause them to overlap with adjacent pulses, causing what is now called intersymbol interference. To prevent intersymbol interference it was necessary to reduce the transmission speed of the transatlantic telegraph cable to the equivalent of 1/15 baud. This is an exceptionally slow data transmission rate, even for human operators who had great difficulty operating a morse key that slowly. For voice circuits (telephone) the frequency response distortion is usually more important than dispersion whereas digital signals are highly susceptible to dispersion distortion. For any kind of analogue image transmission such as video or facsimile both kinds of distortion need to be mitigated.

An analogous Heaviside condition for dispersionless propagation in left-handed transmission lines metamaterial cannot be derived, since no combination of reactive and resistive elements would yield a constant group velocity.

== Derivation ==
The transmission function of a transmission line is defined in terms of its input and output voltages when correctly terminated (that is, with no reflections) as

$$\frac{V_\mathrm{out}}{V_\mathrm{in}} = e^{- \gamma x}$$

where $x$ represents distance from the transmitter in meters and

$\gamma = \alpha + j \beta = \sqrt{(R + j \omega L)(G + j \omega C)}$.

are the secondary line constants, α being the attenuation constant in nepers per metre and β being the phase constant in radians per metre. For no distortion, α is required to be independent of the angular frequency ω, while β must be proportional to ω. This requirement for proportionality to frequency is due to the relationship between the velocity, v, and phase constant, β being given by,

$$v = \frac{\omega}{\beta}$$

and the requirement that phase velocity, v, be constant at all frequencies.

The relationship between the primary and secondary line constants is given by

$$\gamma^2 = (\alpha +j \beta)^2 = (R+j \omega L)(G + j \omega C) = \omega^2 LC (j+\frac R {\omega L} )(j+\frac G {\omega C} )$$

If the Heaviside condition holds, then the square root function can be carried out explicitly as:

$$\gamma =  \omega \sqrt { LC }(\frac R {\omega L} +j) =   \frac R {Z_0} +j\omega \sqrt { LC }$$

where

$$Z_0 = \sqrt{ \frac L C}$$.

Hence

$$\alpha = \frac R {Z_0} = R \sqrt{ \frac C L} = R  \sqrt{ \frac {LG/R} L} = \sqrt{RG}$$.
$$\beta = \omega \sqrt { LC }$$.
$$v = \frac 1 {\sqrt { LC }}$$.

Velocity is independent of frequency if the product $LC$ is independent of frequency. Attenuation is independent of frequency if the product $RG$ is independent of frequency.

=== Characteristic impedance ===
The characteristic impedance of a lossy transmission line is given by

$$Z_0=\sqrt{\frac{R+j\omega L}{G+j\omega C}}$$

In general, it is not possible to impedance match this transmission line at all frequencies with any finite network of discrete elements because such networks are rational functions of jω, but in general the expression for characteristic impedance is complex due to the square root term. However, for a line which meets the Heaviside condition, there is a common factor in the fraction which cancels out the frequency dependent terms leaving,

$$Z_0=\sqrt{\frac{L}{C}},$$

which is a real number, and independent of frequency if L/C is independent of frequency. The line can therefore be impedance-matched with just a resistor at either end. This expression for $\scriptstyle Z_0 = \sqrt{L/C}$ is the same as for a lossless line ($\scriptstyle R = 0,\ G = 0$) with the same L and C, although the attenuation (due to R and G) is of course still present.

== Practical use ==
An example of loaded cable

A real line will have a G that is very low and will usually not come anywhere close to meeting the Heaviside condition. The normal situation is that

$\frac{G}{C} \ll \frac{R}{L}$ by several orders of magnitude.

To make a line meet the Heaviside condition one of the four primary constants needs to be adjusted and the question is which one. G could be increased, but this is highly undesirable since increasing G will increase the loss. Decreasing R is sending the loss in the right direction, but this is still not usually a satisfactory solution. R must be decreased by a large number and to do this the conductor cross-sections must be increased dramatically. This not only makes the cable much bulkier, but also adds significantly to the amount of copper (or other metal) being used and hence the cost and weight. Decreasing the capacitance is difficult because it requires using a different dielectric with a lower permittivity. Gutta-percha insulation used in the early trans-Atlantic cables has a dielectric constant of about 3, hence C could be decreased by a maximum factor of no more than 3. This leaves increasing L which is the usual solution adopted.

L is increased by loading the cable with a metal with high magnetic permeability. It is also possible to load a cable of conventional construction by adding discrete loading coils at regular intervals. This is not identical to a distributed loading, the difference being that with loading coils there is distortionless transmission up to a definite cut-off frequency beyond which the attenuation increases rapidly.

Loading cables is no longer a common practice. Instead, regularly spaced digital repeaters are now placed in long lines to maintain the desired shape and duration of pulses for long-distance transmission.

=== Frequency-dependent line parameters ===
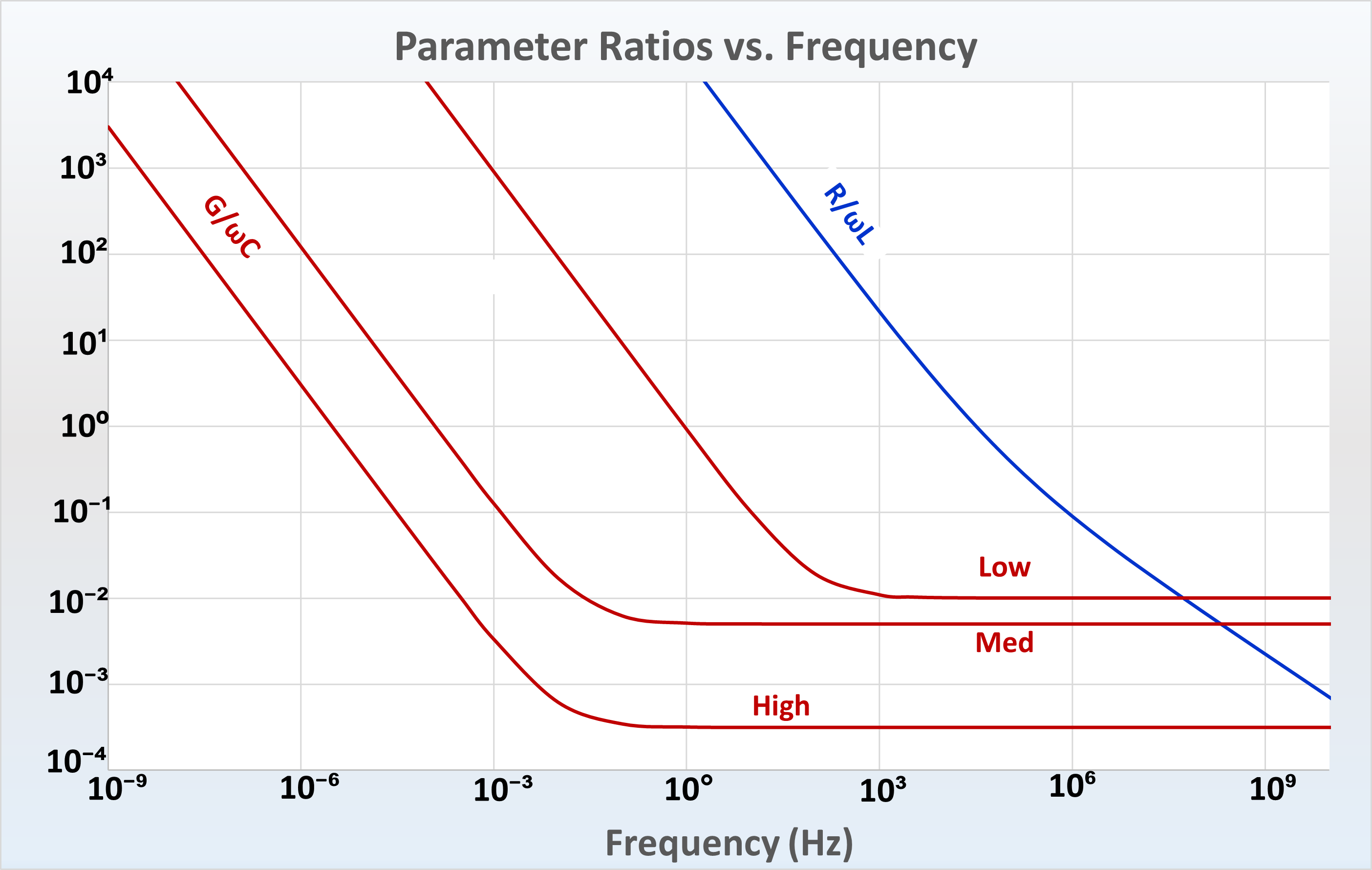
Typical transmission line parameter ratios

When the line parameters are frequency dependent, there are additional considerations. Achieving the Heaviside condition is more difficult when some or all of the line parameters depend on frequency. Typically, R (due to skin effect) and G (due to dielectric loss) are strong functions of frequency. If magnetic material is added to increase L, then L also becomes frequency dependent.

The chart on the left plots the ratios $\tfrac {R_{\omega}} {\omega L_{\omega}} ({\color{blue}\text{blue} }) \text{ and } \tfrac {G_{\omega}} {\omega C_{\omega}} ({\color{red}\text{red} })$ for typical transmission lines made from non-magnetic materials. The Heaviside condition is satisfied where the blue curve touches or crosses a red curve.

The knee of the blue curve occurs at the frequency where $R_{\omega} = \omega L_{\omega}$.

There are three red curves indicating typical low, medium, and high-quality dielectrics. Pulp insulation (used for telephone lines in the early 20th century), gutta-percha, and modern foamed plastics are examples of low, medium, and high-quality dielectrics. The knee of each curve occurs at the frequency where $G_{\omega} = \omega C_{\omega}$. The reciprocal of this frequency is known as the dielectric relaxation time of the dielectric. Above this frequency, the value of G/(ωC) is the same as the loss tangent of the dielectric material. The curve is depicted as flat on the figure, but loss tangent shows some frequency dependence. The value of G/(ωC) at all frequencies is determined entirely by properties of the dielectric and is independent of the transmission line cross-section.

== See also ==
- Maxwell's equations
- Telegrapher's equations

== Bibliography ==
- Nahin, Paul J, Oliver Heaviside: The Life, Work, and Times of an Electrical Genius of the Victorian Age, JHU Press, 2002 ISBN 0801869099. See especially pp. 231-232.
- Schroeder, Manfred Robert, Fractals, Chaos, Power Laws, Courier Corporation, 2012 ISBN 0486134784.
