= Transmission function =

Transmission function can refer to

- transfer function
- propagation constant
