= Oliver Heaviside =

British mathematician and electrical engineer (1850–1925)

Oliver Heaviside FRS
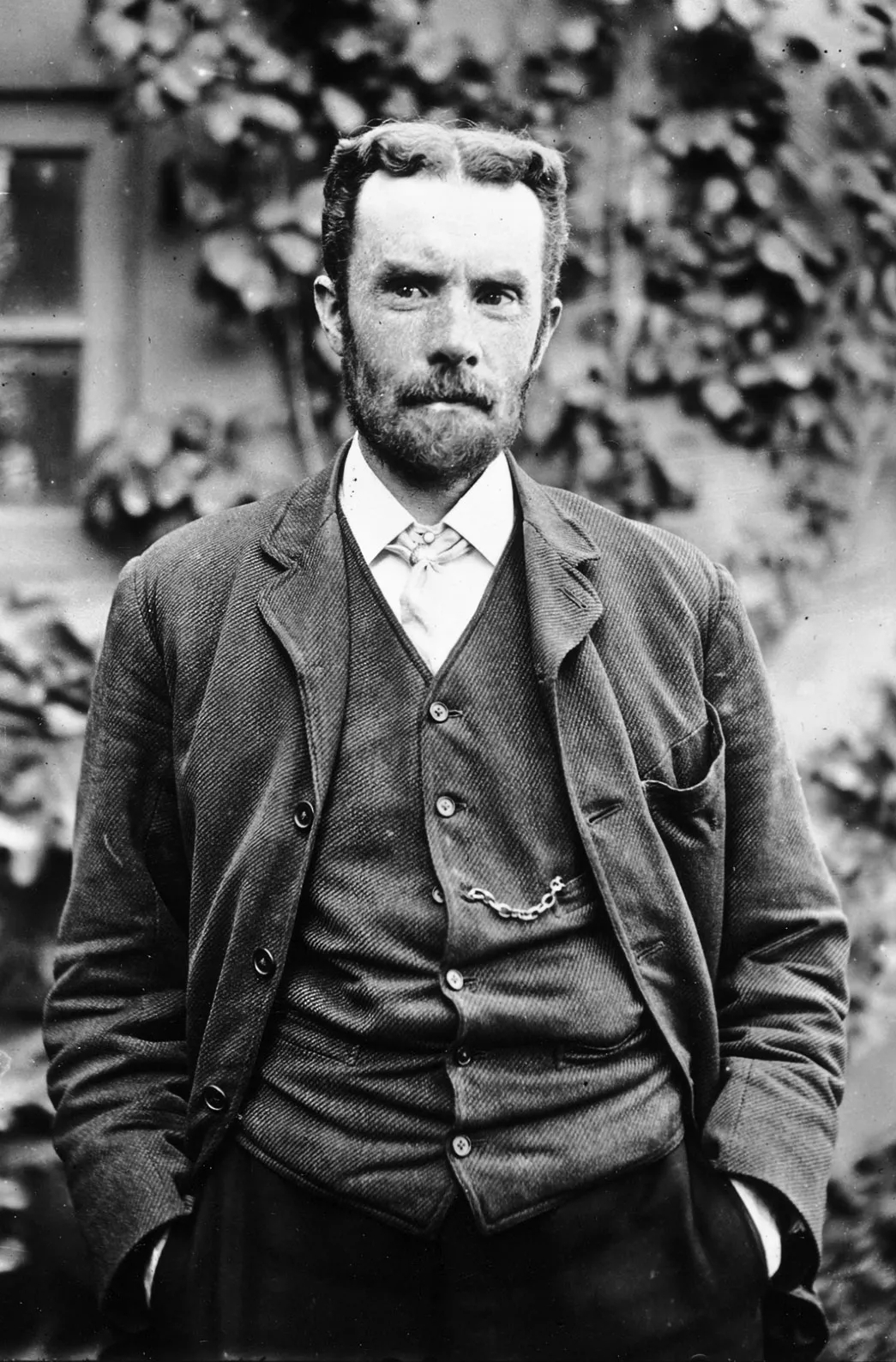
- Heaviside, c. 1900
- Born: 18 May 1850; Camden Town, England
- Died: 3 February 1925 (aged 74); Torquay, England
- Known for: Heaviside condition; Heaviside step function; Heaviside cover-up method; Heaviside–Lorentz units; Heaviside–Feynman formula; Kennelly–Heaviside layer; Maxwell–Heaviside equations; Telegrapher's equations; Operational calculus; Vector calculus; Coaxial cable; Coining the term impedance
- Relatives: Charles Wheatstone (uncle-in-law)
- Awards: FRS (1891); Faraday Medal (1922)
- Scientific career
- Fields: Mathematics; Electrical engineering

Oliver Heaviside (/ˈhɛvisaɪd/ HEV-ee-syde; 18 May 1850 – 3 February 1925) was a British mathematician and electrical engineer who invented a new technique for solving differential equations (equivalent to the Laplace transform), independently developed vector calculus, and rewrote Maxwell's equations in the form commonly used today. He significantly shaped the way Maxwell's equations were understood and applied in the decades following Maxwell's death. Also, in 1893, he extended them to gravitoelectromagnetism, which was confirmed by Gravity Probe B in 2005. His formulation of the telegrapher's equations became commercially important during his own lifetime, after their significance went unremarked for a long while, as few others were versed at the time in his novel methodology. Although at odds with the scientific establishment for most of his life, Heaviside's work altered much of telecommunications, mathematics, and science.

== Early years ==
Oliver Heaviside was born on 18 May 1850 at 55 Kings Street (now Plender Street) in Camden Town, England, the youngest of three children of Thomas Heaviside, a draughtsman and wood engraver, and Rachel Elizabeth West. He was a short and red-headed child, and suffered from scarlet fever when young, which left him with a hearing impairment that he felt hindered his ability to make friends as a child due to him finding it harder to communicate with other children. He described his time in Kings Street as miserable claiming it led him to hate craftspeople and viewing his father's experiences with alcohol encouraged him to abstain from it for all of his life. A small legacy enabled the family to move to a better part of Camden when he was thirteen and he was sent to Camden House Grammar School. He was a good student, placing fifth out of five hundred pupils in 1865, but his parents could not keep him at school after he was 16, so he continued studying for a year by himself and had no further formal education.

Heaviside's uncle by marriage was Sir Charles Wheatstone (1802–1875), an internationally celebrated expert in telegraphy and electromagnetism, and the original co-inventor of the first commercially successful telegraph in the mid-1830s. Wheatstone took a strong interest in his nephew's education, and in 1867 sent him north to work with his older brother Arthur Wheatstone, who was managing one of Charles' telegraph companies in Newcastle upon Tyne.

Two years later he took a job as a telegraph operator with the Danish Great Northern Telegraph Company laying a cable from Newcastle to Denmark using British contractors. He soon became an electrician. Heaviside continued to study while working, and by the age of 22 he published an article in the prestigious Philosophical Magazine on 'The Best Arrangement of Wheatstone's Bridge for measuring a Given Resistance with a Given Galvanometer and Battery' which received positive comments from physicists who had unsuccessfully tried to solve this algebraic problem, including Sir William Thomson, to whom he gave a copy of the paper, and James Clerk Maxwell. When he published an article on the duplex method of using a telegraph cable, he poked fun at R. S. Culley, the engineer in chief of the Post Office telegraph system, who had been dismissing duplex as impractical. Later in 1873 his application to join the Society of Telegraph Engineers was turned down with the comment that "they didn't want telegraph clerks". This riled Heaviside, who asked Thomson to sponsor him, and along with support of the society's president he was admitted "despite the P.O. snobs".

In 1873, Heaviside had encountered Maxwell's newly published, and later famous, two-volume Treatise on Electricity and Magnetism. In his old age Heaviside recalled:

I remember my first look at the great treatise of Maxwell's when I was a young man... I saw that it was great, greater and greatest, with prodigious possibilities in its power... I was determined to master the book and set to work. I was very ignorant. I had no knowledge of mathematical analysis (having learned only school algebra and trigonometry which I had largely forgotten) and thus my work was laid out for me. It took me several years before I could understand as much as I possibly could. Then I set Maxwell aside and followed my own course. And I progressed much more quickly... It will be understood that I preach the gospel according to my interpretation of Maxwell.

Undertaking research from home, he helped develop transmission line theory (also known as the "telegrapher's equations"). Heaviside showed mathematically that uniformly distributed inductance in a telegraph line would diminish both attenuation and distortion, and that, if the inductance were great enough and the insulation resistance not too high, the circuit would be distortionless in that currents of all frequencies would have equal speeds of propagation. Heaviside's equations helped further the implementation of the telegraph.

== Middle years ==
From 1882 to 1902, except for three years, Heaviside contributed regular articles to the trade paper The Electrician, which wished to improve its standing, for which he was paid £40 per year. This was hardly enough to live on, but his demands were very small and he was doing what he most wanted. Between 1883 and 1887 he averaged 2–3 articles per month and these articles later formed the bulk of his Electromagnetic Theory and Electrical Papers.

In 1880, Heaviside researched the skin effect in telegraph transmission lines. That same year he patented, in England, the coaxial cable. In 1884 he recast Maxwell's mathematical analysis from its original cumbersome form (they had already been recast as quaternions) to its modern vector terminology, thereby reducing twelve of the original twenty equations in twenty unknowns down to the four differential equations in two unknowns we now know as Maxwell's equations. These four re-formulated equations describe the nature of electric charges (both static and moving), magnetic fields, and the relationship between the two, namely electromagnetic fields.

Between 1880 and 1887, Heaviside developed the operational calculus using $p$ for the differential operator, (which Boole had previously denoted by $D$), giving a method of solving differential equations by direct solution as algebraic equations. This later caused a great deal of controversy, owing to its lack of rigour. He famously said, "Mathematics is an experimental science, and definitions do not come first, but later on. They make themselves, when the nature of the subject has developed itself." On another occasion he asked, "Shall I refuse my dinner because I do not fully understand the process of digestion?”

In 1887, Heaviside worked with his brother Arthur on a paper entitled "The Bridge System of Telephony". However the paper was blocked by Arthur's superior, William Henry Preece of the Post Office, because part of the proposal was that loading coils (inductors) should be added to telephone and telegraph lines to increase their self-induction and correct the distortion which they suffered. Preece had recently declared self-inductance to be the great enemy of clear transmission. Heaviside was also convinced that Preece was behind the sacking of the editor of The Electrician which brought his long-running series of articles to a halt (until 1891). There was a long history of animosity between Preece and Heaviside. Heaviside considered Preece to be mathematically incompetent, an assessment supported by the biographer Paul J. Nahin: "Preece was a powerful government official, enormously ambitious, and in some remarkable ways, an utter blockhead." Preece's motivations in suppressing Heaviside's work were more to do with protecting Preece's own reputation and avoiding having to admit error than any perceived faults in Heaviside's work.

The importance of Heaviside's work remained undiscovered for some time after publication in The Electrician. In 1897, AT&T employed one of its own scientists, George A. Campbell, and an external investigator Michael I. Pupin to find some respect in which Heaviside's work was incomplete or incorrect. Campbell and Pupin extended Heaviside's work, and AT&T filed for patents covering not only their research, but also the technical method of constructing the coils previously invented by Heaviside. AT&T later offered Heaviside money in exchange for his rights; it is possible that the Bell engineers' respect for Heaviside influenced this offer. However, Heaviside refused the offer, declining to accept any money unless the company were to give him full recognition. Heaviside was chronically poor, making his refusal of the offer even more striking. In 1959, Norbert Wiener published his fiction The Tempter and accused AT&T (named Williams Controls Company) and Michael I. Pupin (named Diego Dominguez) of having usurped Heaviside's inventions.

But this setback turned Heaviside's attention towards electromagnetic radiation, and in two papers of 1888 and 1889, he calculated the deformations of electric and magnetic fields surrounding a moving charge, as well as the effects of it entering a denser medium. This included a prediction of what is now known as Cherenkov radiation, and inspired his friend George FitzGerald to suggest what now is known as the Lorentz–FitzGerald contraction.

In 1889, Heaviside first published a correct derivation of the magnetic force on a moving charged particle, which is the magnetic component of what is now called the Lorentz force.

In the late 1880s and early 1890s, Heaviside worked on the concept of electromagnetic mass. Heaviside treated this as material mass, capable of producing the same effects. Wilhelm Wien later verified Heaviside's expression (for low velocities).

In 1891 the British Royal Society recognized Heaviside's contributions to the mathematical description of electromagnetic phenomena by naming him a Fellow of the Royal Society, and the following year devoting more than fifty pages of the Philosophical Transactions of the Society to his vector methods and electromagnetic theory. He was elected to honorary membership of the Manchester Literary and Philosophical Society in 1894. In 1905 Heaviside was given an honorary doctorate by the University of Göttingen.

== Later years and views ==
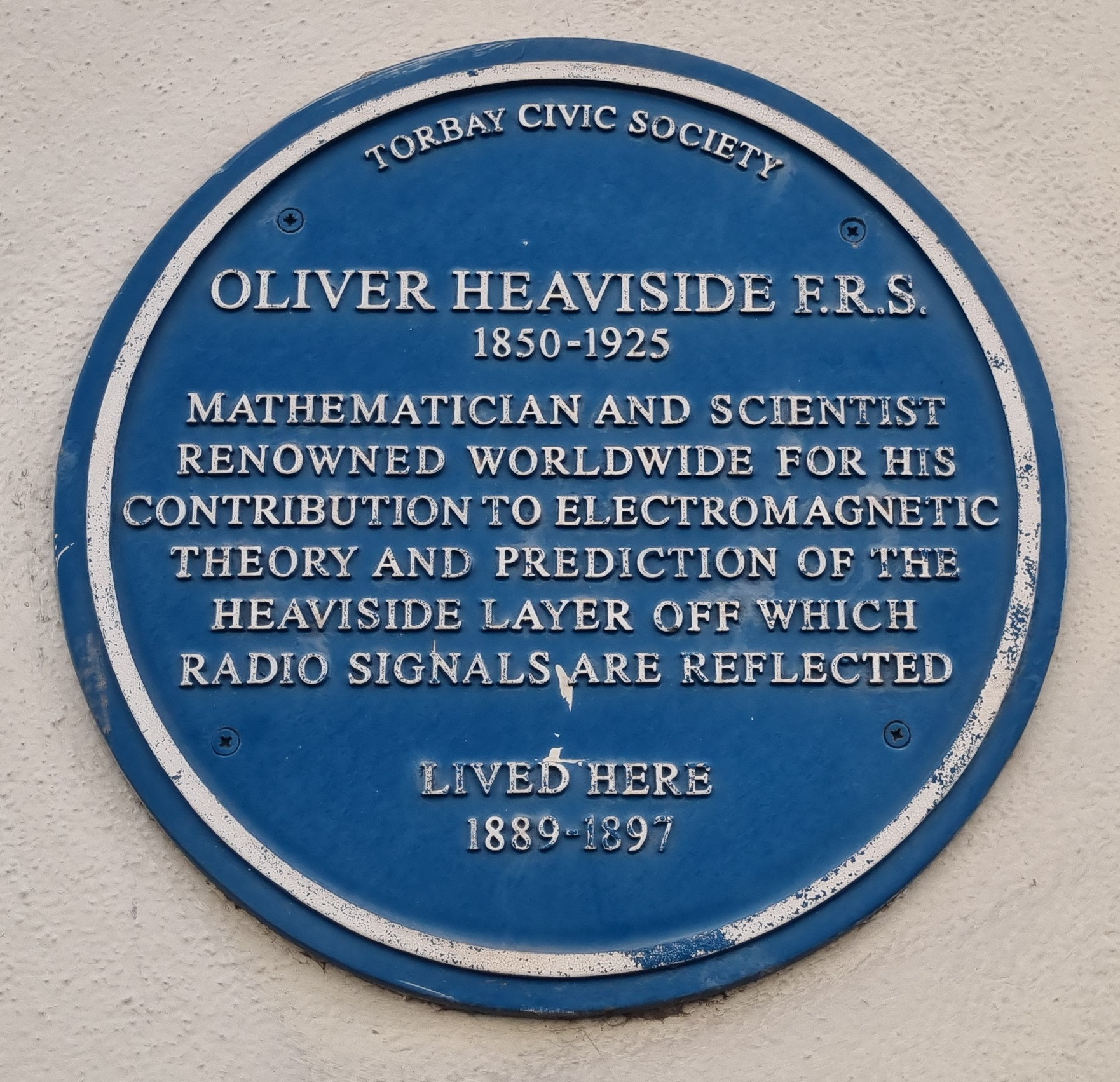
Blue plaque dedicated to Heaviside in Paignton

In 1896, FitzGerald and John Perry obtained a civil list pension of £120 per year for Heaviside, who was now living in Devon, and persuaded him to accept it, after he had rejected other charitable offers from the Royal Society.

In 1902, Heaviside proposed the existence of what is now known as the Kennelly–Heaviside layer of the ionosphere. Heaviside's proposal included means by which radio signals are transmitted around the Earth's curvature. The existence of the ionosphere was confirmed in 1923. The predictions by Heaviside, combined with Planck's radiation theory, probably discouraged further attempts to detect radio waves from the Sun and other astronomical objects. For whatever reason, there seem to have been no attempts for 30 years, until Jansky's development of radio astronomy in 1932.

Heaviside was an opponent of Albert Einstein's theory of relativity. Mathematician Howard Eves has commented that Heaviside "was the only first-rate physicist at the time to impugn Einstein, and his invectives against relativity theory often bordered on the absurd".

In later years his behavior became quite eccentric. According to associate B.A. Behrend, he became a recluse who was so averse to meeting people that he delivered the manuscripts of his Electrician papers to a grocery store, where the editors picked them up. Though he had been an active cyclist in his youth, his health seriously declined in his sixth decade. During this time Heaviside would sign letters with the initials "W.O.R.M." after his name. Heaviside also reportedly started painting his fingernails pink and had granite rocks moved into his house for furniture. In 1922, he became the first recipient of the Faraday Medal, which was established that year.

On Heaviside's religious views, he was a Unitarian, but not religious. He was even said to have made fun of people who put their faith in a supreme being.

Heaviside died on 3 February 1925 in Torquay at the age of 74, after falling from a ladder. He is buried just behind and to the right of the building near the southeast corner of Paignton cemetery. He is buried with his father, Thomas, and his mother, Rachel. The gravestone was cleaned thanks to an anonymous donor sometime in 2005. He was always held in high regard by most electrical engineers, particularly after his correction to Kelvin's transmission line analysis was vindicated, but most of his wider recognition was gained posthumously.

=== Heaviside Memorial Project ===
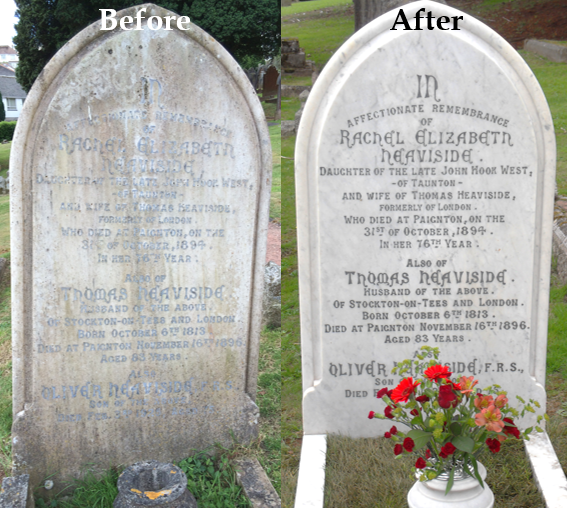
Comparison Heaviside’s grave before and after the restoration project.

In July 2014, academics at Newcastle University, UK and the Newcastle Electromagnetics Interest Group founded the Heaviside Memorial Project in a bid to fully restore the monument through public subscription. The restored memorial was ceremonially unveiled on 30 August 2014 by Alan Heather, a distant relative of Heaviside. The unveiling was attended by the Mayor of Torbay, the Member of Parliament (MP) for Torbay, an ex-curator of the Science Museum (representing the Institution of Engineering and Technology), the Chairman of the Torbay Civic Society, and delegates from Newcastle University.

=== Institution of Engineering and Technology ===
A collection of Heaviside's papers is held at the Institution of Engineering and Technology (IET) Archive Centre. The collection consists of notebooks containing mathematical equations and calculations, annotated pamphlets mainly relating to telegraphy, manuscript notes, drafts of papers, correspondence, drafts of articles for ‘Electromagnetic Theory’. An audio tribute from 1950 to Oliver Heaviside by Oliver E Buckley, President of Bell Telephone Labs, has been digitised and accessible on the IET Archives biography of Oliver Heaviside.

In 1908, Heaviside was made an Honorary Member of the Institution of Electrical Engineers (IEE). His entry reads as: “1908 Oliver Heaviside FRS” in the IEE Roll of Honorary Members and Faraday Medallists 1871-1921 In 1922, he became the first recipient of the Faraday Medal, which was established that year. Later on, in 1950 the Institution of Electrical Engineers Council established the Heaviside Premium Award “The Committee have considered the establishment of some form of permanent memorial to Oliver Heaviside and as a result recommend that a Heaviside Premium to the value of £10 be awarded each year for the best mathematical paper accepted.”

== Innovations and discoveries ==
Heaviside did much to develop and advocate vector methods and vector calculus. Maxwell's formulation of electromagnetism consisted of 20 equations in 20 variables. Heaviside employed the curl and divergence operators of the vector calculus to reformulate 12 of these 20 equations into four equations in four variables ($\textbf{B}, \textbf{E}, \textbf{J} ~\text{and} ~\rho$), the form by which they have been known ever since (see Maxwell's equations). Less well known is that Heaviside's equations and Maxwell's are not exactly the same, and in fact it is easier to modify the former to make them compatible with quantum physics. The possibility of gravitational waves was also discussed by Heaviside using the analogy between the inverse-square law in gravitation and electricity. With quaternion multiplication, the square of a vector is a negative quantity, much to Heaviside's displeasure. As he advocated abolishing this negativity, he has been credited by C. J. Joly with developing hyperbolic quaternions, though in fact that mathematical structure was largely the work of Alexander Macfarlane.

He invented the Heaviside step function, using it to calculate the current when an electric circuit is switched on. He was the first to use the unit impulse function now usually known as the Dirac delta function. He invented his operational calculus method for solving linear differential equations. This resembles the currently used Laplace transform method based on the "Bromwich integral" named after Bromwich who devised a rigorous mathematical justification for Heaviside's operator method using contour integration. Heaviside was familiar with the Laplace transform method but considered his own method more direct.

Heaviside developed the transmission line theory (also known as the "telegrapher's equations"), which increased the transmission rate over transatlantic cables by a factor of ten. It originally took ten minutes to transmit each character, and this immediately improved to one character per minute. Closely related to this was his discovery that telephone transmission could be greatly improved by placing electrical inductance in series with the cable. Heaviside also independently discovered the Poynting vector.

Heaviside advanced the idea that the Earth's uppermost atmosphere contained an ionised layer known as the ionosphere; in this regard, he predicted the existence of what later was dubbed the Kennelly–Heaviside layer. In 1947, Edward Appleton received the Nobel Prize in Physics for proving that this layer really existed.

=== Electromagnetic terms ===
Heaviside coined the following terms of art in electromagnetic theory:

- admittance (reciprocal of impedance) (December 1887);
- elastance (reciprocal of permittance, reciprocal of capacitance) (1886);
- conductance (real part of admittance, reciprocal of resistance) (September 1885);
- electret for the electric analogue of a permanent magnet, or, in other words, any substance that exhibits a quasi-permanent electric polarization (e.g. ferroelectric);
- impedance (July 1886);
- inductance (February 1886);
- permeability (September 1885);
- permittance (now called capacitance) and permittivity (June 1887);
- reluctance (May 1888);

Heaviside is sometimes incorrectly credited with coining susceptance (the imaginary part of admittance) and reactance (the imaginary part of impedance). The former was coined by Charles Proteus Steinmetz (1894). The latter was coined by Édouard Hospitalier (1893).

== Publications ==
- 1885, 1886, and 1887, "Electromagnetic induction and its propagation", The Electrician.
- 1888/89, "Electromagnetic waves, the propagation of potential, and the electromagnetic effects of a moving charge", The Electrician.
- 1889, "On the Electromagnetic Effects due to the Motion of Electrification through a Dielectric", Phil.Mag.S.5 27: 324.
- 1892 "On the Forces, Stresses, and Fluxes of Energy in the Electromagnetic Field" Phil.Trans.Royal Soc. A 183:423–80.
- 1892 "On Operators in Physical Mathematics" Part I. Proc. Roy. Soc. 1892 Jan 1. vol.52 pp. 504–529
- 1892 Heaviside, Oliver (1892). Electrical Papers. Vol. 1. Macmillan Co, London and New York. ISBN 9780828402354.
- 1893 "On Operators in Physical Mathematics" Part II Proc. Roy. Soc. 1893 Jan 1. vol.54 pp. 105–143
- 1893 "A gravitational and electromagnetic analogy," The Electrician, vol.31, pp. 281–282 (part I), p. 359 (part II)
  - 1893 reproduced in, Electromagnetic Theory vol I, Chapter 4 Appendix B pp. 455-466
- 1893 Heaviside, Oliver (1893). Electromagnetic Theory. Vol. 1. The Electrician Printing and Publishing Co, London. ISBN 978-0-8284-0235-4.
- 1894 Heaviside, Oliver (1894). Electrical Papers. Vol. 2. Macmillan Co, London and New York.
- 1899 Heaviside, Oliver (1899). Electromagnetic Theory. Vol. 2. The Electrician Printing and Publishing Co, London.
- 1912 Heaviside, Oliver (1912). Electromagnetic Theory. Vol. 3. The Electrician Printing and Publishing Co, London.
- 1925. Electrical Papers. 2 vols Boston 1925 (Copley)
- 1950 Electromagnetic theory: The complete & unabridged edition. (Spon) reprinted 1950 (Dover)
- 1970 Heaviside, Oliver (1970). Electrical Papers. Chelsea Publishing Company, Incorporated. ISBN 978-0-8284-0235-4.
- 1971 "Electromagnetic theory; Including an account of Heaviside's unpublished notes for a fourth volume" Chelsea, ISBN 0-8284-0237-X
- 2001 Heaviside, Oliver (1 December 2001). Electrical Papers. American Mathematical Society. ISBN 978-0-8218-2840-3.

== See also ==
- 1850 in science
- Electric displacement field
- Biot–Savart law
- Bridge circuit § Heaviside bridge
