= Telegrapher's equations =

Mathematical descriptions of transmission line voltage and current

The telegrapher's equations (or telegraph equations) are a set of two coupled, linear partial differential equations that model voltage and current along a linear electrical transmission line. The equations are important because they allow transmission lines to be analyzed using circuit theory. The equations and their solutions are applicable from 0 Hz (i.e. direct current) to frequencies at which the transmission line structure can support higher order non-TEM modes. The equations can be expressed in both the time domain and the frequency domain. In the time domain the independent variables are distance and time. In the frequency domain the independent variables are distance $x$ and either frequency, $\omega$, or complex frequency, $s$. The frequency domain variables can be taken as the Laplace transform or Fourier transform of the time domain variables or they can be taken to be phasors in which case the frequency domain equations can be reduced to ordinary differential equations of distance. An advantage of the frequency domain approach is that differential operators in the time domain become algebraic operations in frequency domain.

The equations come from Oliver Heaviside who developed the transmission line model starting with an August 1876 paper, On the Extra Current. The model demonstrates that the electromagnetic waves can be reflected on the wire, and that wave patterns can form along the line. Originally developed to describe telegraph wires, the theory can also be applied to radio frequency conductors, audio frequency (such as telephone lines), low frequency (such as power lines), and pulses of direct current.

== Distributed components ==
Schematic representation of the elementary components of a transmission line

The telegrapher's equations result from circuit theory. In a more practical approach, one assumes that the conductors are composed of an infinite series of two-port elementary components, each representing an infinitesimally short segment of the transmission line:

- The distributed resistance $R$ of the conductors is represented by a series resistor (expressed in ohms per unit length). In practical conductors, at higher frequencies, $R$ increases approximately proportional to the square root of frequency due to the skin effect.
- The distributed inductance $L$ (due to the magnetic field around the wires, self-inductance, etc.) is represented by a series inductor (henries per unit length).
- The capacitance $C$ between the two conductors is represented by a shunt capacitor $C$ (farads per unit length).
- The conductance $G$ of the dielectric material separating the two conductors is represented by a shunt resistor between the signal wire and the return wire (siemens per unit length). This resistor in the model has a resistance of $\textstyle R_\text{shunt} = \frac{1}{ G }\, \Omega$. $G$ accounts for both bulk conductivity of the dielectric and dielectric loss. If the dielectric is an ideal vacuum, then $G \equiv 0$.

The model consists of an infinite series of the infinitesimal elements shown in the figure, and the values of the components are specified per unit length, so the picture of the component can be misleading. An alternative notation is to use $R'$, $L'$, $C'$, and $G'$ to emphasize that the values are derivatives with respect to length, and that the units of measure combine correctly. These quantities can also be known as the primary line constants to distinguish from the secondary line constants derived from them, these being the characteristic impedance, the propagation constant, attenuation constant and phase constant. All these constants are constant with respect to time, voltage and current. They may be non-constant functions of frequency.

=== Role of different components ===
Diagram showing a wave flowing rightward down a lossless transmission line. Black dots represent electrons, and the arrows show the electric field.

The role of the different components can be visualized based on the animation at right.

Inductance L
The inductance couples current to energy stored in the magnetic field. It makes it look like the current has inertia – i.e. with a large inductance, it is difficult to increase or decrease the current flow at any given point. Large inductance L makes the wave move more slowly, just as waves travel more slowly down a heavy rope than a light string. Large inductance also increases the line's surge impedance (more voltage needed to push the same AC current through the line).
Capacitance C
The capacitance couples voltage to the energy stored in the electric field. It controls how much the bunched-up electrons within each conductor repel, attract, or divert the electrons in the other conductor. By deflecting some of these bunched up electrons, the speed of the wave and its strength (voltage) are both reduced. With a larger capacitance, C, there is less repulsion, because the other line (which always has the opposite charge) partly cancels out these repulsive forces within each conductor. Larger capacitance equals weaker restoring forces, making the wave move slightly slower, and also gives the transmission line a lower surge impedance (less voltage needed to push the same AC current through the line).
Resistance R
Resistance corresponds to resistance interior to the two lines, combined. That resistance R couples current to ohmic losses that drop a little of the voltage along the line as heat deposited into the conductor, leaving the current unchanged. Generally, the line resistance is very low, compared to inductive reactance ωL at radio frequencies, and for simplicity is treated as if it were zero, with any voltage dissipation or wire heating accounted for as corrections to the "lossless line" calculation, or just ignored.
Conductance G
Conductance between the lines represents how well current can "leak" from one line to the other. Conductance couples voltage to dielectric loss deposited as heat into whatever serves as insulation between the two conductors. G reduces propagating current by shunting it between the conductors. Generally, wire insulation (including air) is quite good, and the conductance is almost nothing compared to the capacitive susceptance ωC, and for simplicity is treated as if it were zero.

All four parameters L, C, R, and G depend on the material used to build the cable or feedline. All four change with frequency: R and G tend to increase for higher frequencies; L and C tend to drop as the frequency goes up. The figure at right shows a lossless transmission line, where both R and G are zero, which is the simplest and by far most common form of the telegrapher's equations used, but slightly unrealistic (especially regarding R).

=== Values of primary parameters for telephone cable ===
Representative parameter data for 24 gauge telephone polyethylene insulated cable (PIC) at 70 °F (294 K)
Frequency (Hz)	R		L		G		C	
Frequency (Hz)	Ω/km	Ω/(1000 ft)	μH/km	μH/(1000 ft)	μS/km	μS/(1000 ft)	nF/km	nF/(1000 ft)
1 Hz	172.24	52.50	612.9	186.8	0.000	0.000	51.57	15.72
1 kHz	172.28	52.51	612.5	186.7	0.072	0.022	51.57	15.72
10 kHz	172.70	52.64	609.9	185.9	0.531	0.162	51.57	15.72
100 kHz	191.63	58.41	580.7	177.0	3.327	1.197	51.57	15.72
1 MHz	463.59	141.30	506.2	154.3	29.111	8.873	51.57	15.72
2 MHz	643.14	196.03	486.2	148.2	53.205	16.217	51.57	15.72
5 MHz	999.41	304.62	467.5	142.5	118.074	35.989	51.57	15.72

The variation of R and L is mainly due to skin effect and proximity effect. The constancy of the capacitance is a consequence of intentional design.

The variation of G can be inferred from a statement by Frederick Terman: "The power factor ... tends to be independent of frequency, since the fraction of energy lost during each cycle ... is substantially independent of the number of cycles per second over wide frequency ranges."

A function of the form
$$G(f) = G_1 \cdot \left( \frac {f}{f_1}\right)^{g_\mathrm{e}}$$
with $g_\mathrm{e}$ close to 1.0 would fit Terman's statement. Walter Chen gives an equation of similar form. Where $G(f)$ is conductivity as a function of frequency; and $G_1$, $f_1$, and $g_\mathrm{e}$ are all real constants.

Usually the resistive losses ($R$) grow proportionately to $\textstyle \sqrt{f}$ and dielectric losses grow proportionately to $\textstyle f^{g_\mathrm{e} }$ with $g_\mathrm{e} \approx 1$, so at a high enough frequency, dielectric losses will exceed resistive losses. In practice, before that point is reached, a transmission line with a better dielectric is used. In long distance rigid coaxial cable, to get very low dielectric losses, the solid dielectric may be replaced by air with plastic spacers at intervals to keep the center conductor on axis.

== The equation ==
=== Time domain ===
The telegrapher's equations in the time domain are:
$$\begin{align}
\frac{\partial}{\partial x} V(x,t) &= -L \, \frac{\partial}{\partial t} I(x,t) - R I(x,t) \\[1ex]
\frac{\partial}{\partial x} I(x,t) &= -C \, \frac{\partial}{\partial t} V(x,t) - G V(x,t)
\end{align}$$

They can be combined to get two partial differential equations, each with only one dependent variable, either $V$ or $I$:
$$\begin{align}
\frac{\partial^2}{\partial x^2} V(x,t) - LC \, \frac{\partial^2}{\partial t^2} V(x,t) &= \left( RC + GL \right) \frac{\partial}{\partial t} V(x,t) + GR \, V(x,t) \\[1ex]
\frac{\partial^2}{\partial x^2} I(x,t) - LC \, \frac{\partial^2}{\partial t^2} I(x,t) &= \left( RC + GL \right) \frac{\partial}{\partial t} I(x,t) + GR \, I(x,t)
\end{align}$$

Except for the dependent variable ($V$ or $I$) the formulas are identical.

=== Frequency domain ===
The telegrapher's equations in the frequency domain are developed in similar forms:
$$\begin{align}
\frac{d}{dx} \mathbf{V}_\omega(x) &= -\left( j \omega L_\omega + R_\omega \right) \mathbf{I}_\omega(x) ,
\\[1ex]
\frac{d}{d x} \mathbf{I}_\omega(x) &= -\left( j \omega C_\omega + G_\omega \right) \mathbf{V}_\omega(x) .
\end{align}$$
Here, $\mathbf{I}_\omega(x)$ and $\mathbf{V}_\omega(x)$ are phasors, with the subscript $\omega$ indicating the possible frequency-dependence of the parameters.

The first equation means that $\mathbf{V}_\omega(x)$, the propagating voltage at point $x$, is decreased by the voltage loss produced by $\mathbf{I}_\omega(x)$, the current at that point passing through the series impedance $R + j \omega L$. The second equation means that $\mathbf{I}_\omega(x)$, the propagating current at point $x$, is decreased by the current loss produced by $\mathbf{V}_\omega(x)$, the voltage at that point appearing across the shunt admittance $G + j \omega C$.

These equations may be combined to produce two uncoupled second-order ordinary differential equations
$$\begin{align}
\frac{d^2}{dx^2} \mathbf{V}_\omega(x) &= \gamma^2 \mathbf{V}_\omega(x), \\[1ex]
\frac{d^2}{dx^2} \mathbf{I}_\omega(x) &= \gamma^2 \mathbf{I}_\omega(x),
\end{align}$$
with
$$\gamma \equiv \alpha + j \beta \equiv \sqrt { \left( R_\omega + j \omega L_\omega \right) \left( G_\omega + j \omega C_\omega\right) },$$
where $\alpha$ is called the attenuation constant and $\beta$ is called the phase constant.

Working in the frequency domain has the benefit of dealing with both steady state and transient problems in a similar fashion. In case of the latter the frequency $\omega$ becomes a continuous variable; a solution can be obtained by first solving the above (homogeneous) second-order ODEs and then applying the Fourier inversion theorem.

==== Homogeneous solutions ====
Each of the preceding differential equations have two homogeneous solutions in an infinite transmission line.

For the voltage equation
$$\begin{align}
\mathbf{V}_\omega^+(x) &= \mathbf{V}_\omega^+(a) \, e^{+\gamma (a-x)} && \text{forward voltage wave} ; \\
+ \mathbf{V}_\omega^-(x) &= \mathbf{V}_\omega^-(b) \, e^{-\gamma (b-x)} && \text{reverse voltage wave} ; \\ \hline
\mathbf{V}_{\omega }(x)_\hphantom{,\mathsf{F}} &= \mathbf{V}_\omega^+(x) + \mathbf{V}_\omega^-(x) && \text{total voltage wave}.
\end{align}$$

For the current equation
$$\begin{align}
\mathbf{I}_\omega^+(x) &= \mathbf{I}_\omega^+(a) \, e^{+\gamma (a-x)} && \text{forward current wave} ; \\
- \mathbf{I}_\omega^-(x) &= \mathbf{I}_\omega^-(b) \, e^{-\gamma (b-x)} && \text{reverse current wave} ; \\ \hline
\mathbf{I}_{\omega}(x)_\hphantom{,\mathsf{F}} &= \mathbf{I}_\omega^+(x) - \mathbf{I}_\omega^-(x) && \text{total current wave} .
\end{align}$$

The negative sign in the previous equation indicates that the current in the reverse wave is traveling in the opposite direction.

Note:
$$\begin{align}
\mathbf{V}_\omega^+(x) = \mathbf{Z}_0 \, \mathbf{I}_\omega^+(x) , \\[0.4ex]
\mathbf{V}_\omega^-(x) = \mathbf{Z}_0 \, \mathbf{I}_\omega^-(x) ,
\end{align}$$
$$\mathbf{Z}_0 = \sqrt{ \frac{ R_\omega + j \omega L_\omega }{ G_\omega + j \omega C_\omega} }\, ,$$
where the following symbol definitions hold:

Symbol definitions
Symbol	Definition
$a$	point at which the values of the forward waves are known
$b$	point at which the values of the reverse waves are known
$\mathbf{V}_{\omega}(x)$	value of the total voltage at point x
$\mathbf{V}_\omega^+(x)$	value of the forward voltage wave at point x
$\mathbf{V}_\omega^-(x)$	value of the reverse voltage wave at point x
$\mathbf{V}_\omega^+(a)$	value of the forward voltage wave at point a displaced from x
$\mathbf{V}_\omega^-(b)$	value of the reverse voltage wave at point b displaced from x
$\mathbf{I}_{\omega}(x)$	value of the total current at point x
$\mathbf{I}_\omega^+(x)$	value of the forward current wave at point x
$\mathbf{I}_\omega^-(x)$	value of the reverse current wave at point x
$\mathbf{I}_\omega^+(a)$	value of the forward current wave at point a displaced from x
$\mathbf{I}_\omega^-(b)$	value of the reverse current wave at point b displaced from x
$\mathbf{Z}_0$	characteristic impedance
$\gamma$	propagation constant

==== Finite length ====
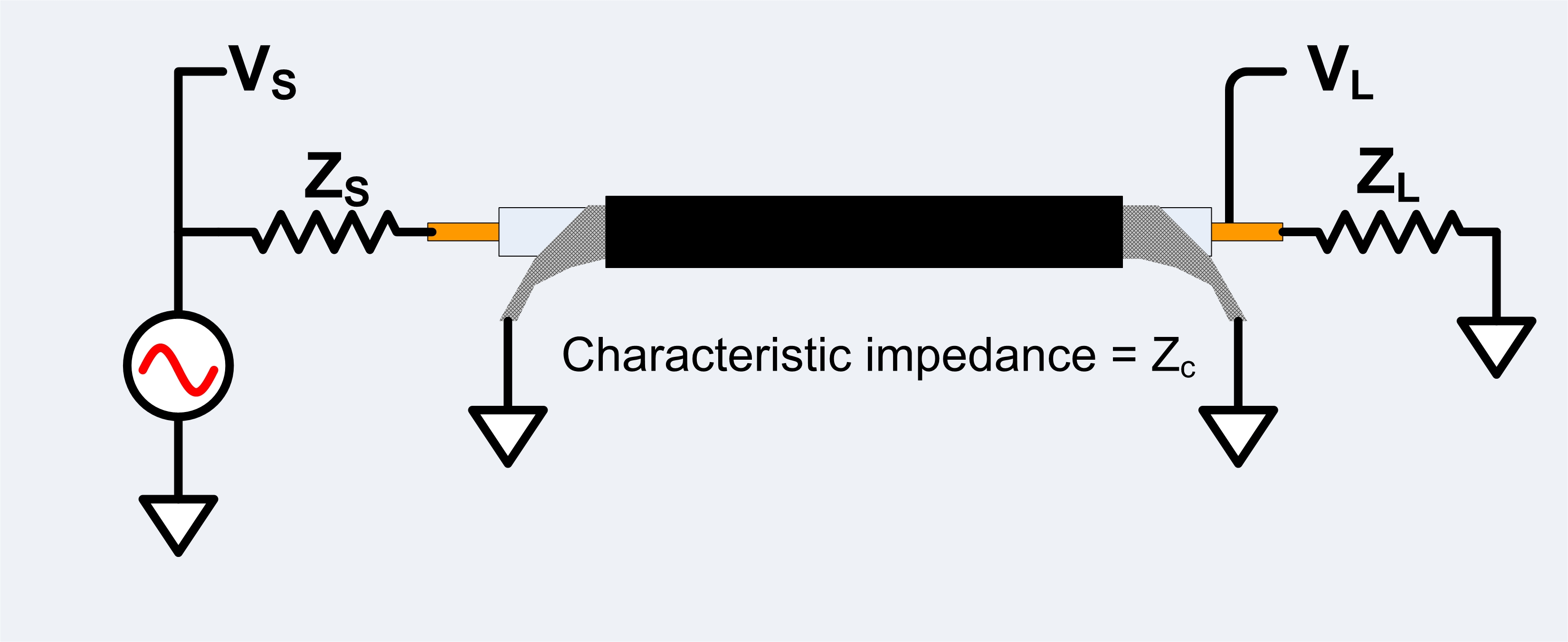
Coaxial transmission line with one source and one load

Johnson gives the following solution,
$$\begin{align}
\frac{\mathbf{V}_\mathsf{L} }{ \mathbf{V}_\mathsf{S} }
&= \left[ \left(\frac{ \mathbf{H}^{-1} +\mathbf{H} }{ 2 }\right) \left( 1 + \frac{ \mathbf{Z}_\mathsf{S} }{\mathbf{Z}_\mathsf{L} }\right) + \left(\frac{\mathbf{H}^{-1} - \mathbf{H} }{ 2 }\right) \left( \frac{ \mathbf{Z}_\mathsf{S} }{ \mathbf{\mathbf{Z}}_0 } + \frac{ \mathbf{Z}_0 }{ \mathbf{Z}_\mathsf{L} }\right) \right]^{-1}
\\[2ex]
&= \frac{ \mathbf{Z}_\mathsf{L} \mathbf{Z}_0 }{ \mathbf{Z}_0 \left( \mathbf{Z}_\mathsf{L} + \mathbf{Z}_\mathsf{S} \right) \cosh\left( \boldsymbol{\gamma} x \right) + \left( \mathbf{Z}_\mathsf{L} \mathbf{Z}_\mathsf{S} + \mathbf{Z}_0^2 \right) \sinh\left( \boldsymbol{\gamma} x\right) }
\end{align}$$
where $\mathbf{H} \equiv e^{-\boldsymbol{\gamma} x}$, and $x$ is the length of the transmission line.

In the special case where all the impedances are equal, $\mathbf{Z}_\mathsf{L} = \mathbf{Z}_\mathsf{S} = \mathbf{Z}_0$, the solution reduces to $\frac{ \mathbf{V}_\mathsf{L} }{ \mathbf{V}_\mathsf{S} } = \frac{1}{2} e^{-\boldsymbol{\gamma} x}$.

== Lossless transmission ==
When $\omega L \gg R$ and $\omega C \gg G$, wire resistance and insulation conductance can be neglected, and the transmission line is considered as an ideal lossless structure. In this case, the model depends only on the $L$ and $C$ elements. The telegrapher's equations then describe the relationship between the voltage $V$ and the current $I$ along the transmission line, each of which is a function of position $x$ and time $t$:
$$\begin{align}
V &= V(x,t) \\[.5ex]
I &= I(x,t)
\end{align}$$
The equations themselves consist of a pair of coupled, first-order, partial differential equations. The first equation shows that the induced voltage is related to the time rate-of-change of the current through the cable inductance, while the second shows, similarly, that the current drawn by the cable capacitance is related to the time rate-of-change of the voltage.
$$\frac{\partial V}{\partial x} = - L \frac{\partial I}{\partial t}$$
$$\frac{\partial I}{\partial x} = - C \frac{\partial V}{\partial t}$$

These equations may be combined to form two wave equations, one for voltage $V$, the other for current $I$:
$$\begin{align}
\frac{\partial^2 V}{\partial t^2} - {\tilde v}^2 \frac{\partial^2 V}{\partial x^2} &= 0 \\[1ex]
\frac{\partial^2 I}{\partial t^2} - {\tilde v}^2 \frac{\partial^2 I}{\partial x^2} &= 0
\end{align}$$
where
$${\tilde v} \equiv \frac{ 1 }{ \sqrt{ L C } }$$
is the propagation speed of waves traveling through the transmission line. For transmission lines made of parallel perfect conductors with vacuum between them, this speed is equal to the speed of light.

=== Lossless sinusoidal steady-state ===
In the case of sinusoidal steady-state (i.e., when a pure sinusoidal voltage is applied and transients have ceased) the angular frequency $\omega$ is fixed and the voltage and current take the form of single-tone sine waves:
$$\begin{align}
V(x,t) &= \mathcal{Re} \left\{ V(x)  e^{ j \omega t } \right\}, \\[1ex]
I(x,t) &= \mathcal{Re} \left\{ I(x)  e^{ j \omega t } \right \}.
\end{align}$$
In this case, the telegrapher's equations reduce to
$$\begin{align}
\frac{dV}{dx} &= -j \omega L I = - L \frac{d I}{d t}, \\[1ex]
\frac{dI}{dx} &= -j \omega C V = - C \frac{d V}{d t}.
\end{align}$$

Likewise, the wave equations reduce to one-dimensional Helmholtz equations
$$\begin{align}
&\frac{d^2 V}{dx^2}+ k^2 V = 0 , \\[1ex]
&\frac{d^2 I}{dx^2}+ k^2 I = 0 ,
\end{align}$$
where k is the wave number:
$$k := \omega \sqrt{ LC\ } = \frac{ \omega }{ \tilde v } .$$
In the lossless case, it is possible to show that
$$V(x) = V_1 \, e^{ - j k x } + V_2 \, e^{ + j k x },$$
and
$$I(x) = \frac{ V_1 }{ Z_0 } \, e^{ - j k x } - \frac{ V_2 }{ Z_0 }\, e^{ + j k x }\ ,$$
where in this special case, $k$ is a real quantity that may depend on frequency and $Z_0$ is the characteristic impedance of the transmission line, which, for a lossless line is given by
$$Z_0 = \sqrt{ \frac{ L }{ C }\ }\ ,$$
and $V_1$ and $V_2$ are arbitrary constants of integration, which are determined by the two boundary conditions (one for each end of the transmission line).

This impedance does not change along the length of the line since $L$ and $C$ are constant at any point on the line, provided that the cross-sectional geometry of the line remains constant.

=== Loss-free case, general solution ===
In the loss-free case $R = G = 0$, the general solution of the wave equation for the voltage is the sum of a forward traveling wave and a backward traveling wave:
$$V(x,t) = f_1( x - {\tilde v} t ) + f_2( x + {\tilde v} t )$$
where

- $f_1$ and $f_2$ can be any two analytic functions, and
- $\textstyle {\tilde v} \equiv \frac{1}{\sqrt{L C} }$ is the waveform's propagation speed (also known as phase velocity).

Here, $f_1$ represents the amplitude profile of a wave traveling from left to right – in a positive $x$ direction – whilst $f_2$ represents the amplitude profile of a wave traveling from right to left. It can be seen that the instantaneous voltage at any point $x$ on the line is the sum of the voltages due to both waves.

Using the current $I$ and voltage $V$ relations given by the telegrapher's equations, we can write
$$I(x,t) = \frac{ 1 }{ Z_0 } \Bigl[ f_1(x - {\tilde v} t) - f_2(x + {\tilde v} t) \Bigr] \,.$$

== Lossy transmission line ==
In the presence of losses the solution of the telegrapher's equation has both damping and dispersion, as visible when compared with the solution of a lossless wave equation.

When the loss elements $R$ and $G$ are too substantial to ignore, the differential equations describing the elementary segment of line are
$$\begin{align}
\frac{\partial}{\partial x} V(x,t) &= -L \frac{\partial}{\partial t} I(x,t) - R \, I(x,t) \, , \\[6pt]
\frac{\partial}{\partial x} I(x,t) &= -C \frac{\partial}{\partial t} V(x,t) - G \, V(x,t) \, .
\end{align}$$

By differentiating both equations with respect to $x$, and some algebra, we obtain a pair of damped, dispersive hyperbolic partial differential equations each involving only one unknown:
$$\begin{align}
\frac{\partial^2}{\partial x^2} V &= L C \frac{\partial^2}{\partial t^2} V + \left( R C + G L \right) \frac{\partial}{\partial t} V + G R V , \\[6pt]
\frac{\partial^2}{\partial x^2} I &= L C \frac{\partial^2}{\partial t^2} I + \left( R C + G L \right) \frac{\partial}{\partial t} I + G R I .
\end{align}$$

These equations resemble the homogeneous wave equation with extra terms in $V$ and $I$ and their first derivatives. These extra terms cause the signal to decay and spread out with time and distance. If the transmission line is only slightly lossy $R \ll \omega L$ and $G \ll \omega C$), signal strength will decay over distance as $e^{-\alpha x}$ where $\textstyle \alpha \approx {1\over2}\left(\frac{R}{Z_0} + G Z_0 \right)$.

== Solutions of the telegrapher's equations as circuit components ==
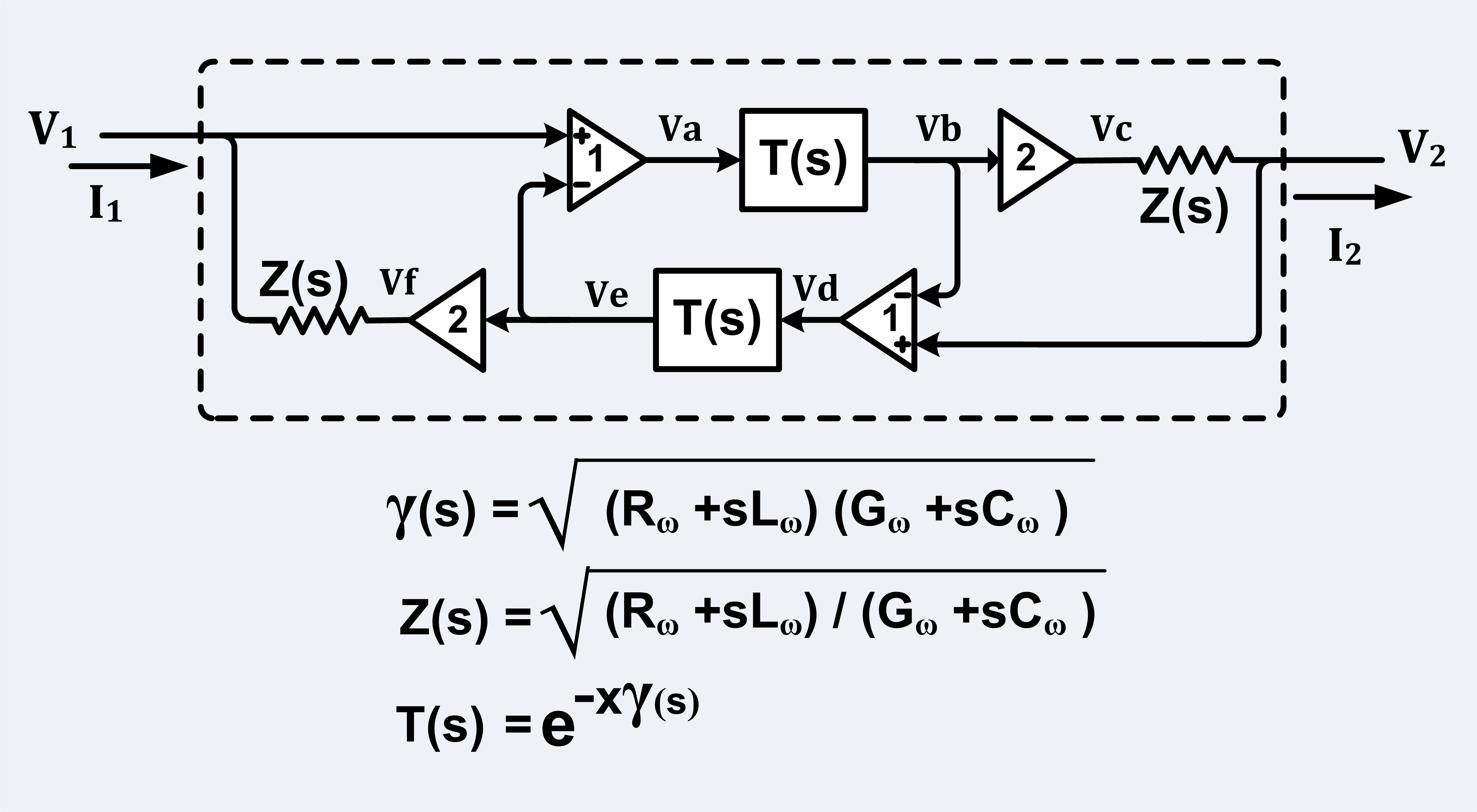
Equivalent circuit of an unbalanced transmission line (such as coaxial cable) where: 2/Z_{0} is the trans-admittance of VCCS (Voltage Controlled Current Source); x is the length of transmission line; Z(s) ≡ Z_{0}(s) is the characteristic impedance; T(s) is the propagation function; γ(s) is the propagation "constant"; s ≡ jω; and j^{2} ≡ −1 is the imaginary unit.

The solutions of the telegrapher's equations can be inserted directly into a circuit as components. The circuit in the figure implements the solutions of the telegrapher's equations. These are not unique, other equivalent circuits are possible.

The solution of the telegrapher's equations can be expressed as an ABCD two-port network with the following defining equations
$$\begin{align}
V_1 &= V_2 \cosh( \gamma x) + I_2 Z_0 \sinh(\gamma x) \, , \\[1ex]
I_1 &=  \frac{V_2}{ Z_0 } \sinh (\gamma x) + I_2 \cosh(\gamma x) \, .
\end{align}$$
where
$$Z_0 \equiv \sqrt{ \frac{ R_\omega + j \omega L_\omega }{ G_\omega + j \omega C_\omega } } ,$$
and
$$\gamma \equiv \sqrt{ \left( R_\omega + j \omega L_\omega \right) \left( G_\omega + j \omega C_\omega \right) } ,$$
just as in the preceding sections. The line parameters R_{ω}, L_{ω}, G_{ω}, and C_{ω} are subscripted by ω to emphasize that they could be functions of frequency.

The ABCD type two-port gives $V_1$ and $I_1$ as functions of $V_2$ and $I_2$. The voltage and current relations are symmetrical: Both of the equations shown above, when solved for $V_1$ and $I_1$ as functions of $V_2$ and $I_2$ yield exactly the same relations, merely with subscripts "1" and "2" reversed, and the $\sinh$ terms' signs made negative ("1"→"2" direction is reversed "1"←"2", hence the sign change).

Every two-wire or balanced transmission line has an implicit (or in some cases explicit) third wire which is called the shield, sheath, common, earth, or ground. So every two-wire balanced transmission line has two modes which are nominally called the differential mode and common mode. The circuit shown in the bottom diagram only can model the differential mode.

In the top circuit, the voltage doublers, the difference amplifiers, and impedances $Z_0(s)$ account for the interaction of the transmission line with the external circuit. This circuit is a useful equivalent for an unbalanced transmission line like a coaxial cable.

== See also ==
- Complex power
- Law of squares, Lord Kelvin's preliminary work on this subject
- LC circuit
- Reflections of signals on conducting lines
- RLC circuit
- Smith chart
