= Propagation constant =

Measure of change in amplitude and phase of a wave

The propagation constant of a sinusoidal electromagnetic wave is a measure of the change undergone by the amplitude and phase of the wave as it propagates in a given direction. The quantity being measured can be the voltage, the current in a circuit, or a field vector such as electric field strength or flux density. The propagation constant itself measures the dimensionless change in magnitude or phase per unit length. In the context of two-port networks and their cascades, propagation constant measures the change undergone by the source quantity as it propagates from one port to the next.

The propagation constant's value is expressed logarithmically, almost universally to the base e, rather than base 10 that is used in telecommunications in other situations. The quantity measured, such as voltage, is expressed as a sinusoidal phasor. The phase of the sinusoid varies with distance which results in the propagation constant being a complex number, the imaginary part being caused by the phase change.

== Alternative names ==
The term "propagation constant" is somewhat of a misnomer as it usually varies strongly with ω. It is probably the most widely used term but there are a large variety of alternative names used by various authors for this quantity. These include transmission parameter, transmission function, propagation parameter, propagation coefficient and transmission constant. If the plural is used, it suggests that α and β are being referenced separately but collectively as in transmission parameters, propagation parameters, etc. In transmission line theory, α and β are counted among the "secondary coefficients", the term secondary being used to contrast to the primary line coefficients. The primary coefficients are the physical properties of the line, namely R, C, L and G, from which the secondary coefficients may be derived using the telegrapher's equation. In the field of transmission lines, the term transmission coefficient has a different meaning despite the similarity of name: it is the companion of the reflection coefficient.

== Definition ==
The propagation constant, symbol γ, for a given system is defined by the ratio of the complex amplitude at the source of the wave to the complex amplitude at some distance x, such that

$$\frac{A_0}{A_x} = e^{\gamma x} .$$

Inverting the above equation and isolating γ results in the quotient of the complex amplitude ratio's natural logarithm and the distance x traveled:

$$\gamma=\ln\left(\frac{A_0}{A_x}\right)/x$$

Since the propagation constant is a complex quantity we can write:

$$\gamma = \alpha + i \beta\$$

where

- α, the real part, is called the attenuation constant
- β, the imaginary part, is called the phase constant
- $i \equiv j \equiv \sqrt{ -1\ }$; the symbol j is more typical in electrical and electronic engineering.

That β does indeed represent phase can be seen from Euler's formula:

$$e^{i\theta} = \cos{\theta} + i \sin{\theta}\$$

which is a sinusoid which varies in phase as θ varies but does not vary in amplitude because

$$\left| e^{i\theta} \right| = \sqrt{ \cos^2{\theta} + \sin^2{\theta}\;} = 1$$

The reason for the use of base e is also now made clear. The imaginary phase constant, iβ, can be added directly to the attenuation constant, α, to form a single complex number that can be handled in one mathematical operation provided they are to the same base. To arrive at radians requires the base e, and likewise to arrive at nepers for attenuation requires the base e.

The propagation constant for conducting lines can be calculated from the primary line coefficients by means of the relationship

$$\gamma= \sqrt{ Z Y\ }$$

where

$Z = R + i\ \omega L$ is the series impedance of the line per unit length and,
$Y = G + i\ \omega C$ is the shunt admittance of the line per unit length.

=== Plane wave ===
The propagation factor of a plane wave traveling in a linear media in the x direction is given by
$$P = e^{-\gamma x}$$
where

- $\gamma = \alpha + i\ \beta = \sqrt{i\ \omega\ \mu\ (\sigma + i\ \omega \varepsilon) }$
- $x$: distance traveled in the x direction
- $\alpha$: attenuation constant (SI the unit: neper / metre)
- $\beta$: phase constant (SI unit: radian/metre)
- $\omega$: angular frequency (SI unit: radian/second)
- $\sigma$: conductivity of the media
- $\varepsilon = \varepsilon' - i\ \varepsilon''$: complex permittivity of the media
- $\mu = \mu' - i\ \mu''$: complex permeability of the media
- $i$: the imaginary unit

The sign convention is chosen for consistency with propagation in lossy media. If the attenuation constant is positive, then the wave amplitude decreases as the wave propagates in the x direction.

Wavelength, phase velocity, and skin depth have simple relationships to the components of the propagation constant:
$$\lambda = \frac {2 \pi}{\beta} \qquad  v_p = \frac{\omega}{\beta}  \qquad \delta = \frac{1}{\alpha}$$

== Attenuation constant ==
In telecommunications, the term attenuation constant, also called attenuation parameter or attenuation coefficient, is the attenuation of an electromagnetic wave propagating through a medium per unit distance from the source. It is the real part of the propagation constant and is measured using the unit neper per metre. A neper is approximately 8.7 dB. Attenuation constant can be defined by the amplitude ratio

$$\left|\frac{A_0}{A_x}\right|=e^{\alpha x}$$

The propagation constant per unit length is defined as the natural logarithm of the ratio of the sending end current or voltage to the receiving end current or voltage, divided by the distance x involved:

$$\alpha=\ln\left(\left|\frac{A_0}{A_x}\right|\right)/x$$

=== Conductive lines ===
The attenuation constant for conductive lines can be calculated from the primary line coefficients as shown above. For a line meeting the distortionless condition, with a conductance G in the insulator, the attenuation constant is given by

$$\alpha=\sqrt{RG} .$$

However, a real line is unlikely to meet this condition without the addition of loading coils and, furthermore, there are some frequency dependent effects operating on the primary "constants" which cause a frequency dependence of the loss. There are two main components to these losses, the metal loss and the dielectric loss.

The loss of most transmission lines are dominated by the metal loss, which causes a frequency dependency due to finite conductivity of metals, and the skin effect inside a conductor. The skin effect causes R along the conductor to be approximately dependent on frequency according to

$$R \propto \sqrt{\omega}$$

Losses in the dielectric depend on the loss tangent (tan δ) of the material divided by the wavelength of the signal. Thus they are directly proportional to the frequency.

$$\alpha_d={{\pi}\sqrt{\varepsilon_r}\over{\lambda}}{\tan \delta}$$

=== Optical fibre ===
The attenuation constant for a particular propagation mode in an optical fibre is the real part of the axial propagation constant.

== Phase constant ==
In electromagnetic theory, the phase constant, also called phase change constant, parameter or coefficient is the imaginary component of the propagation constant for a plane wave. It represents the change in phase per unit length along the path traveled by the wave at any instant and is equal to the real part of the angular wavenumber of the wave. It is represented by the symbol β (SI unit: radians per metre).

From the definition of (angular) wavenumber for transverse electromagnetic (TEM) waves in lossless media,

$$k = \frac{2\pi}{\lambda} = \beta$$

For a transmission line, the telegrapher's equations tells us that the wavenumber must be proportional to frequency for the transmission of the wave to be undistorted in the time domain. This includes, but is not limited to, the ideal case of a lossless line. The reason for this condition can be seen by considering that a useful signal is composed of many different wavelengths in the frequency domain. For there to be no distortion of the waveform, all these waves must travel at the same velocity so that they arrive at the far end of the line at the same time as a group. Since wave phase velocity is given by

$$v_p = \frac{\lambda}{T} = \frac{f}{\tilde{\nu}} = \frac{\omega}{\beta},$$

it is proved that β is required to be proportional to ω. In terms of primary coefficients of the line, this yields from the telegrapher's equation for a distortionless line the condition

$$\beta = \omega \sqrt{LC},$$

where L and C are, respectively, the inductance and capacitance per unit length of the line. However, practical lines can only be expected to approximately meet this condition over a limited frequency band.

In particular, the phase constant $\beta$ is not always equivalent to the wavenumber $k$. The relation

$$\beta = k$$

applies to the TEM wave, which travels in free space or TEM-devices such as the coaxial cable and two parallel wires transmission lines. Nevertheless, it does not apply to the TE wave (transverse electric wave) and TM wave (transverse magnetic wave). For example, in a hollow waveguide where the TEM wave cannot exist but TE and TM waves can propagate,

$$k=\frac{\omega}{c}$$
$$\beta=k\sqrt{1-\frac{\omega_c^2}{\omega^2}}$$

Here $\omega_{c}$ is the cutoff frequency. In a rectangular waveguide, the cutoff frequency is

$$\omega_{c} = c \sqrt{\left(\frac{n \pi}{a}\right)^2 + \left(\frac{m \pi}{b}\right) ^2},$$

where $m,n \ge 0$ are the mode numbers for the rectangle's sides of length $a$ and $b$ respectively. For TE modes, $m,n \ge 0$ (but $m = n = 0$ is not allowed), while for TM modes $m,n \ge 1$.

The phase velocity equals

$$v_p=\frac{\omega}{\beta}=\frac{c}{\sqrt{1-\frac{\omega_\mathrm{c}^2}{\omega^2}}}>c$$

== Filters and two-port networks ==
The term propagation constant or propagation function is applied to filters and other two-port networks used for signal processing. In these cases, however, the attenuation and phase coefficients are expressed in terms of nepers and radians per network section rather than per unit length. Some authors make a distinction between per unit length measures (for which "constant" is used) and per section measures (for which "function" is used).

The propagation constant is a useful concept in filter design which invariably uses a cascaded section topology. In a cascaded topology, the propagation constant, attenuation constant and phase constant of individual sections may be simply added to find the total propagation constant etc.

=== Cascaded networks ===
Three networks with arbitrary propagation constants and impedances connected in cascade. The Z_{i} terms represent image impedance and it is assumed that connections are between matching image impedances.

The ratio of output to input voltage for each network is given by

$$\frac{V_1}{V_2}=\sqrt{\frac{Z_{I1}}{Z_{I2}}}e^{\gamma_1}$$
$$\frac{V_2}{V_3}=\sqrt{\frac{Z_{I2}}{Z_{I3}}}e^{\gamma_2}$$
$$\frac{V_3}{V_4}=\sqrt{\frac{Z_{I3}}{Z_{I4}}}e^{\gamma_3}$$

The terms $\sqrt{\frac{Z_{In}}{Z_{Im}}}$ are impedance scaling terms and their use is explained in the image impedance article.

The overall voltage ratio is given by

$$\frac{V_1}{V_4}=\frac{V_1}{V_2}\cdot\frac{V_2}{V_3}\cdot\frac{V_3}{V_4}=\sqrt{\frac{Z_{I1}}{Z_{I4}}}e^{\gamma_1+\gamma_2+\gamma_3}$$

Thus for n cascaded sections all having matching impedances facing each other, the overall propagation constant is given by

$$\gamma_\mathrm{total}=\gamma_1 + \gamma_2 + \gamma_3 + \cdots + \gamma_n$$

== See also ==
The concept of penetration depth is one of many ways to describe the absorption of electromagnetic waves. For the others, and their interrelationships, see the article Mathematical descriptions of opacity.

- Propagation speed
