= List of inventions named after people =

This is a list of inventions followed by name of the inventor (or whomever else it is named after). For other lists of eponyms (names derived from people) see Lists of etymologies.

== The list ==
=== A to F ===
- Abney level – William de Wiveleslie Abney
- Aldis lamp – Arthur Cyril Webb Aldis
- Aldrin – Kurt Alder
- Alexanderson alternator – Ernst Alexanderson
- Algorithm – Muḥammad ibn Mūsā al-Khwārizmī
- Anderson shelter – John Anderson, 1st Viscount Waverley
- Anderton Shearer Loader – James Anderton
- Appertization – Nicolas Appert
- Archimedes' screw – Archimedes
- Argand lamp – Aimé Argand
- Armstrong breech-loading gun – William Armstrong, 1st Baron Armstrong
- Armstrong acid – Henry Edward Armstrong
- Austenite – William Chandler Roberts-Austen
- Auston switch – David H. Auston
- Avtomat Kalashnikova (AK-47) – Mikhail Kalashnikov
- Bailey bridge – Donald Bailey
- Bakelite – Leo Baekeland
- Barker code – Ronald Hugh Barker
- Barlow lens – Barlow's wheel – Peter Barlow
- Bath Oliver – William Oliver
- Beaufort scale – Sir Francis Beaufort
- Beecham's Pills – Thomas Beecham
- Belisha beacon – Leslie Hore-Belisha, 1st Baron Hore-Belisha
- Benedict's reagent – Stanley Rossiter Benedict
- Benson raft – Simon Benson
- Bessemer converter – Henry Bessemer
- Billinghurst Requa Battery – William Billinghurst and Josephus Requa
- Birch gun – Noel Birch
- Bird's Custard – Alfred Bird
- Biro – László Bíró
- Blacker Bombard – Stewart Blacker
- Bloomers – Amelia Bloomer
- Botts' dots – Elbert Dysart Botts
- Bourdon gauge – Eugène Bourdon
- Bowden cable – Ernest Monnington Bowden
- Bowie knife – James Bowie
- Bowler hat – Thomas and William Bowler
- Bradshaw's Railway Guide – George Bradshaw
- Braille – Louis Braille
- Bramah Press – Joseph Bramah
- Brannock device – Charles F. Brannock
- Brennan torpedo – Louis Brennan
- Brougham – Henry Brougham, 1st Baron Brougham and Vaux
- M1918 Browning Automatic Rifle – John Browning
- Büchner funnel, Büchner flask – Ernst Büchner
- Bunsen burner – Robert Bunsen
- Burr Arch Truss – Theodore Burr
- Callanetics – Callan Pinckney
- Cardigan – James Brudenell, 7th Earl of Cardigan
- Carnot cycle, Carnot heat engine – Nicolas Léonard Sadi Carnot
- Cassegrain telescope – Laurent Cassegrain
- Catherine Wheel – Catherine of Alexandria
- Chippendale chair, Chippendale furniture – Thomas Chippendale
- Clerihew – Edmund Clerihew Bentley
- Coade stone – Eleanor Coade
- Codd-neck bottle – Hiram Codd
- Coddington magnifier – Henry Coddington
- Colt revolver – Samuel Colt
- Coffey still – Aeneas Coffey
- Congreve rocket – Sir William Congreve, 1st Baronet
- Crompton's mule – Samuel Crompton
- Crookes tube – William Crookes
- Cunningham – Briggs Cunningham
- Daguerreotype – Louis Daguerre
- Dalén light – Gustaf Dalén
- Daly detector – Norman Richard Daly
- Daniell cell – John Frederic Daniell
- Davenport desk – Captain John Davenport
- Davis Gun – Cleland Davis
- Davy lamp – Humphry Davy
- Derrick – Thomas Derrick
- Derringer – Henry Deringer
- Dewar flask – James Dewar
- Diesel engine, diesel fuel – Rudolf Diesel
- Dimroth condenser – Otto Dimroth
- Divers's solution – Edward Divers
- Dr. Martens – Klaus Märtens
- Dolby noise-reduction system – Ray Dolby
- Doppler radar – Christian Doppler
- Draisine – Karl Drais
- Edison effect (Thermionic emission) – Thomas Edison
- Edison screw – Thomas Edison
- Ehrlich's reagent – Paul Ehrlich
- Éolienne Bollée – Ernest Sylvain Bollée
- Ericsson engine – John Ericsson
- Erlenmeyer flask – Emil Erlenmeyer
- Euclidean geometry – Euclid
- Fairbairn–Sykes fighting knife – William Ewart Fairbairn and Eric Anthony Sykes
- Faraday cage – Michael Faraday
- Farrimond friction hitch – Barry Farrimond
- Ferris wheel – George Washington Gale Ferris Jr.
- Flinders bar – Matthew Flinders
- Foley catheter – Frederic Foley
- Foucault pendulum – Léon Foucault
- Francis turbine – James B. Francis
- Franklin stove – Benjamin Franklin
- French drain – Henry F. French
- Fresnel lens – Augustin-Jean Fresnel
- Friedrichs condenser – Fritz Walter Paul Friedrichs
- Frost Airship Glider – William Frost
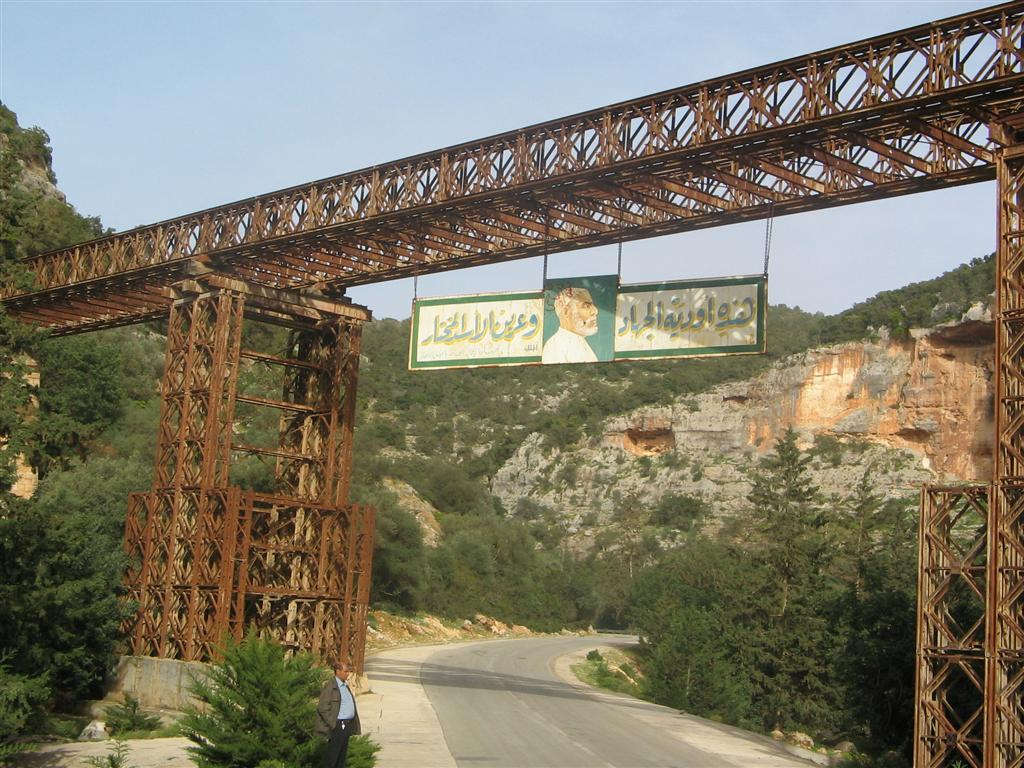
Bailey bridge in Libya

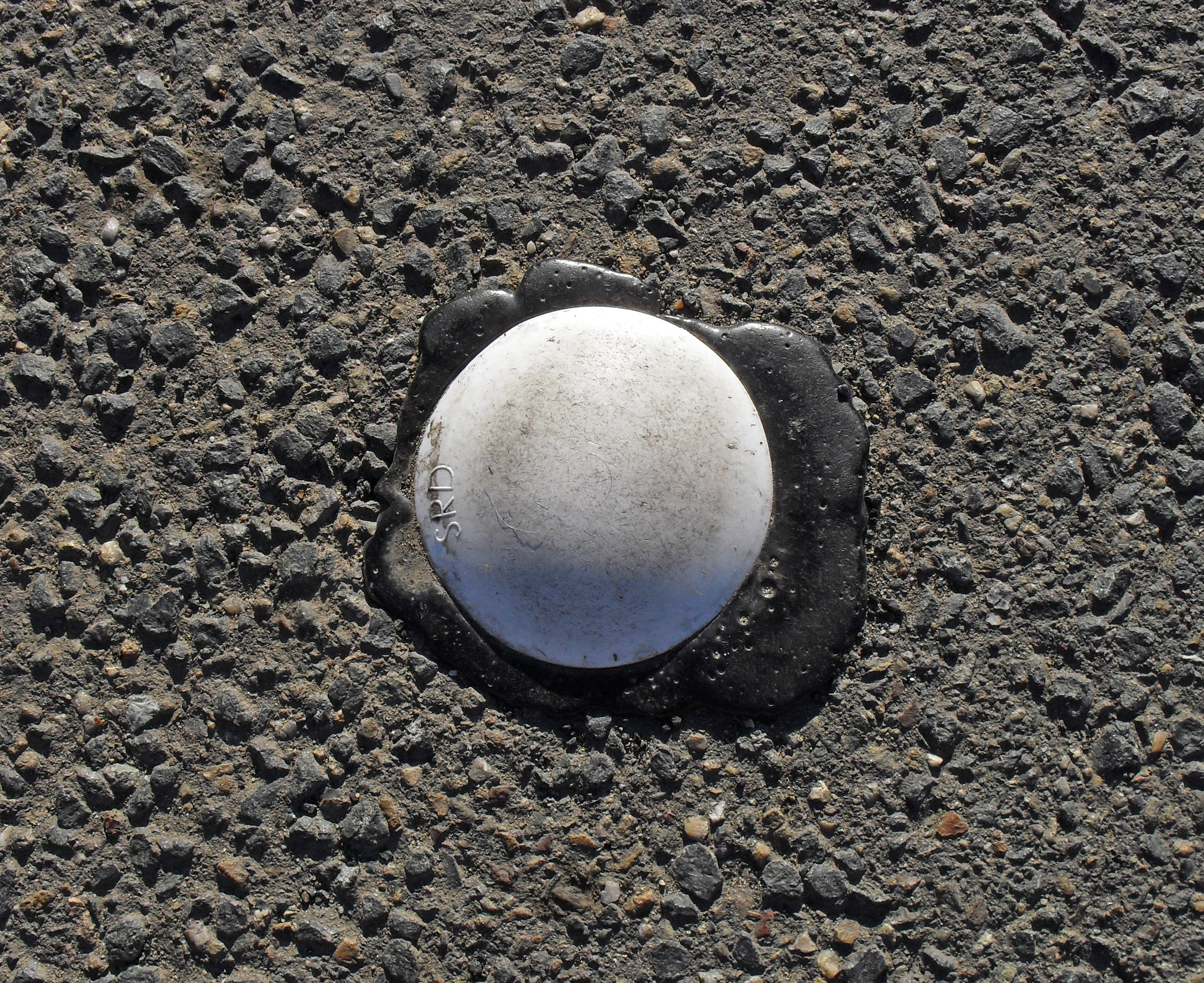
Round, white Botts' dot

Bowler Hat

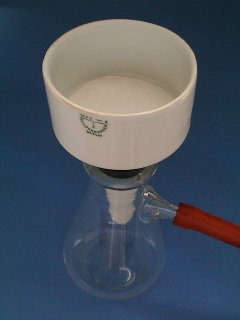
Büchner funnel and flask

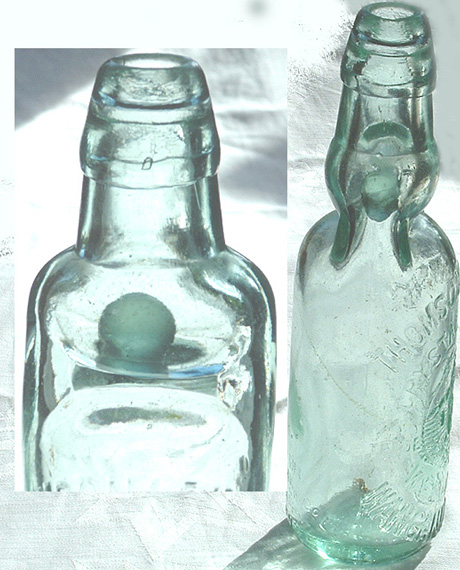
Codd bottles

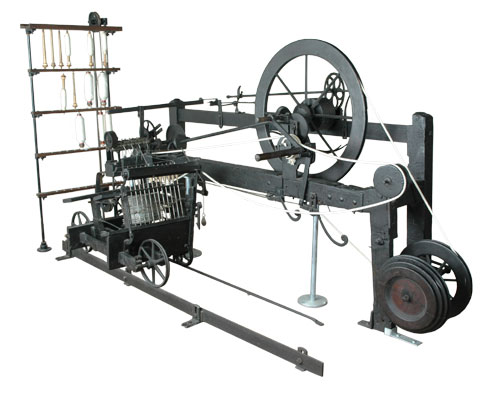
Crompton's mule

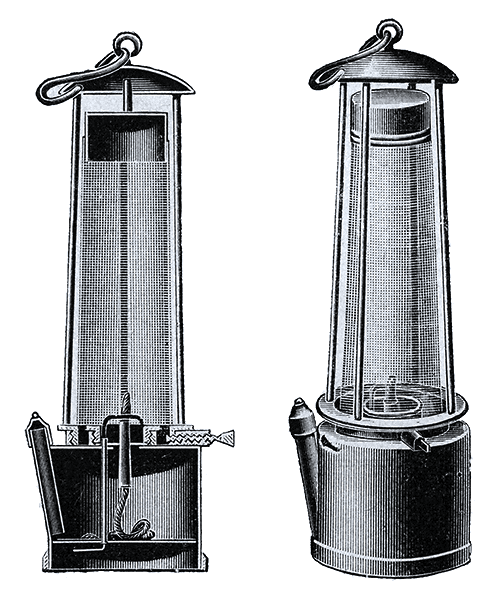
Davy lamp

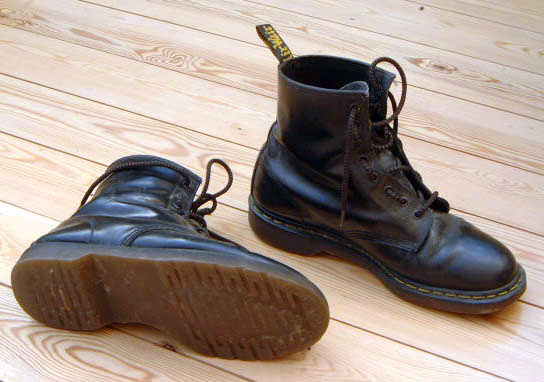
Dr. Martens boots

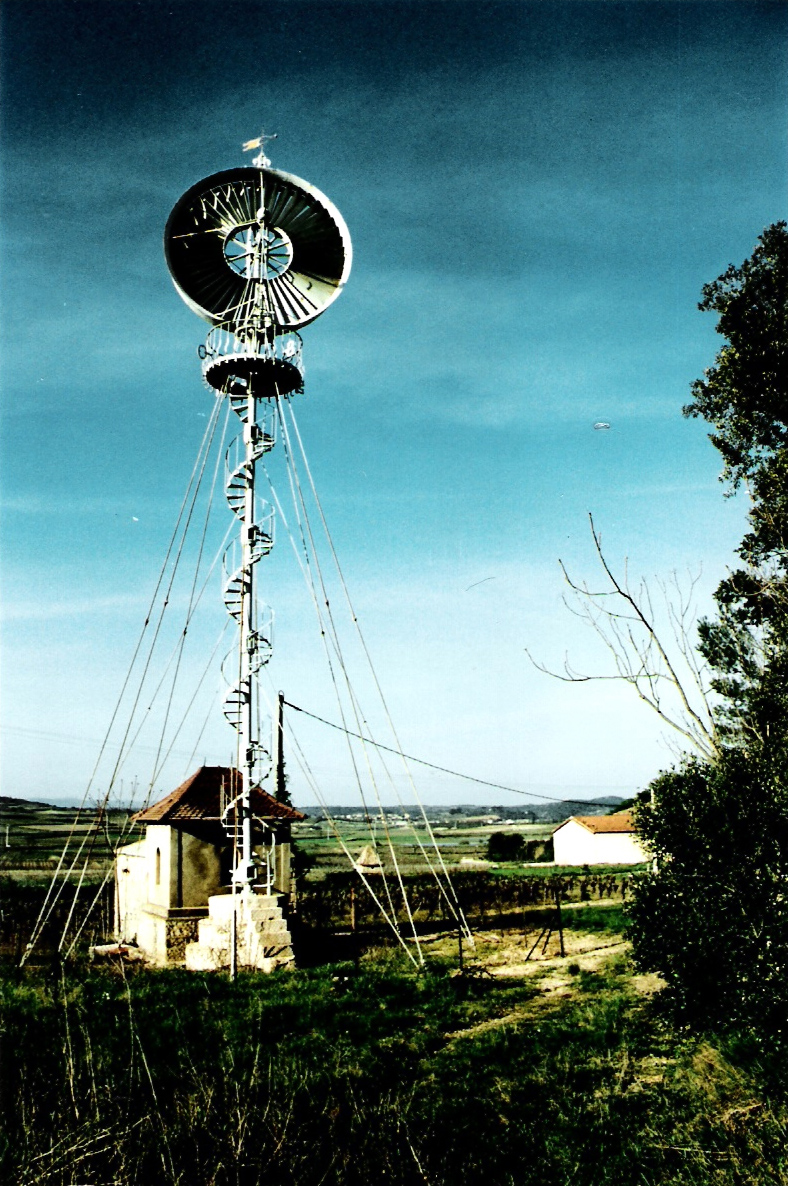
An Éolienne Bollée

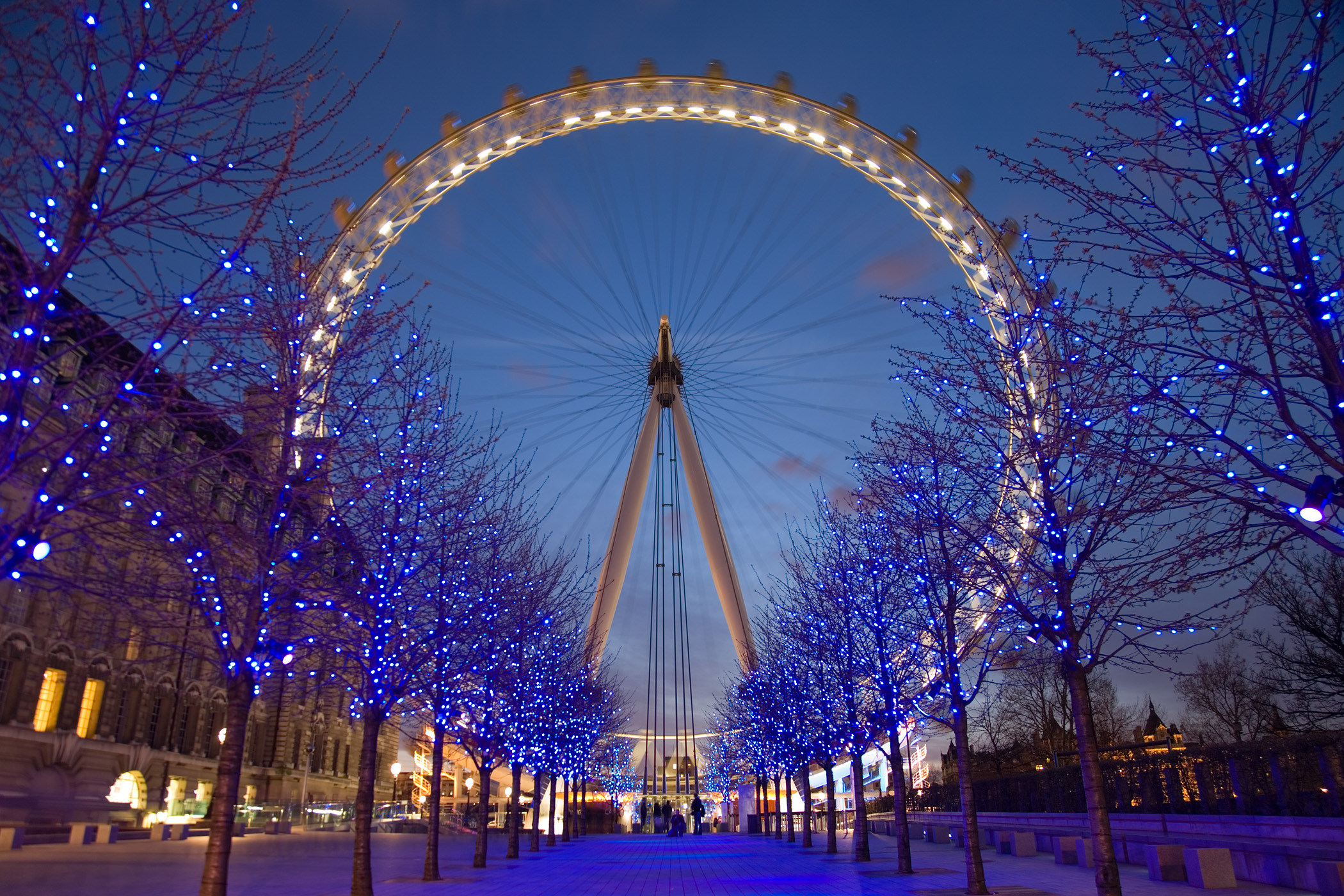
London Eye Ferris wheel

=== G to M ===
- Galil – Yisrael Galil
- Gallup Poll – George Gallup
- Galvanometer, galvanic cell – Luigi Galvani
- Garand – John Garand
- Gatling gun – Richard Jordan Gatling
- Gatso cameras – Maus Gatsonides
- Geiger counter – Hans Geiger
- Geiger–Müller tube – Hans Geiger and Walther Müller
- George Foreman Grill – George Foreman
- Gillette safety razor – King Camp Gillette
- Gladstone bag – William Ewart Gladstone
- Glauber's salt – Johann Rudolf Glauber
- Glock Pistol — Gaston Glock
- Gore-Tex – Bill Gore
- Graham condenser – Thomas D. Graham
- Graham cracker – Rev Sylvester Graham
- Gramme dynamo – Zénobe Gramme
- Gregorian telescope – James Gregory
- Guillotine – Joseph-Ignace Guillotin
- Gurney Stove – Goldsworthy Gurney
- Halkett boat – Peter Halkett
- Hallidie ropeway – Andrew Smith Hallidie
- Halligan bar – Hugh Halligan
- Hammond organ – Laurens Hammond
- Heimlich Maneuver – Henry Heimlich
- Hele-Shaw clutch – Henry Selby Hele-Shaw
- Henry rifle – Benjamin Tyler Henry
- Higgins boat – Andrew Higgins
- Hobbs Meter – John Weston Hobbs
- Holter Monitor – Norman Holter
- Hoover – William Henry Hoover
- Horlicks – James and William Horlick
- Horsley–Clarke apparatus – Victor Horsley and Robert H. Clarke
- Horstmann suspension – Sidney Horstmann
- Howell torpedo – John Adams Howell
- Humphrey pump – H. A. Humphrey
- Hutchinson Patent Stopper – Charles G. Hutchinson
- Inglis Bridge – Charles Inglis
- Jacuzzi – Candido Jacuzzi
- Jacquard loom – Joseph Marie Jacquard
- Josephson junction – Brian David Josephson
- Kalashnikov – Mikhail Kalashnikov
- Kaplan turbine – Viktor Kaplan
- Kay's flying shuttle – John Kay
- Kégresse track – Adolphe Kégresse
- Kelvin bridge – William Thomson, 1st Baron Kelvin
- Ketchum Grenade – William F. Ketchum
- Kilner jar – John Kilner
- Kipp's apparatus – Petrus Jacobus Kipp
- Krarup cable – Carl Emil Krarup
- Land Camera – Edwin H. Land
- Langmuir probe – Irving Langmuir
- Leigh light – Humphrey de Verd Leigh
- Leotard – Jules Léotard
- Leslie speaker – Donald Leslie
- Lewis gun – Isaac Newton Lewis
- Littlejohn adaptor – František Janeček
- Loganberry – James Harvey Logan
- Lyot filter, Lyot stop and Lyot depolarizer – Bernard Lyot
- Macadam, tarmac – John Loudon McAdam
- Machmeter – Ernst Mach
- Mackintosh – Charles Macintosh
- Mae West – Mae West
- Mallet's Mortar – Robert Mallet
- Manby Mortar – George William Manby
- Mansard roof – François Mansart
- Marconi rig – Guglielmo Marconi
- Mason jar – John Landis Mason
- Masonite – William H. Mason
- Mausoleum – Mausolus
- Maxim gun – Hiram Stevens Maxim
- McCormick reaper – Cyrus McCormick
- Melba toast, Peach Melba, Melba sauce – Nellie Melba
- Melvillade – Robert Melville
- Mercator projection – Gerardus Mercator
- Mercerised cotton – John Mercer
- Michelson interferometer – Albert Abraham Michelson
- Mills bomb – William Mills
- Minié ball, Minié rifle – Claude-Étienne Minié
- Molotov cocktail – Vyacheslav Molotov
- Momsen Lung, Charles B. Momsen
- Moog synthesizer – Robert Moog
- Morse code – Samuel Morse
- Muntz metal – George Frederic Muntz
- Murphy bed – William Lawrence Murphy
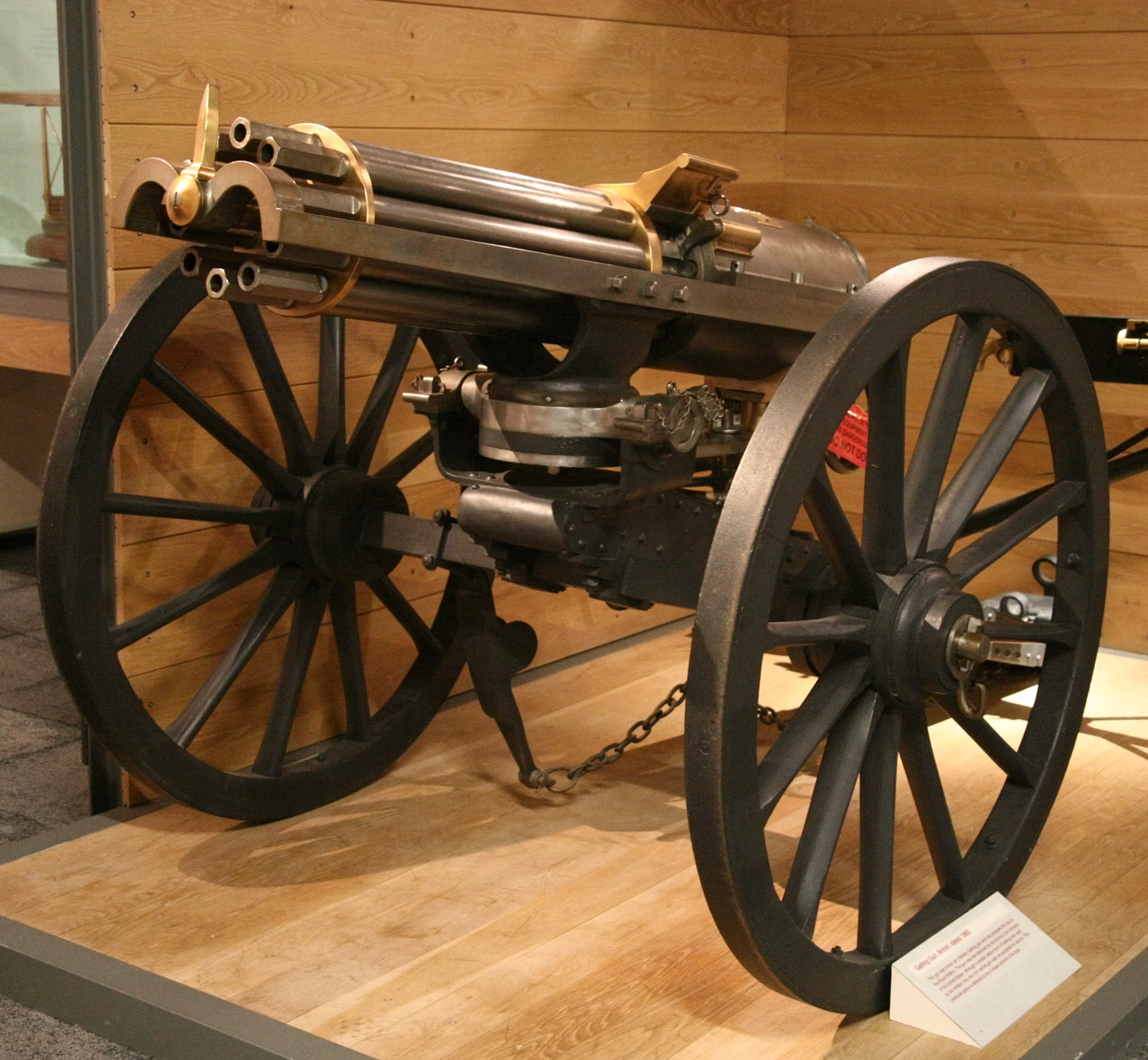
A British Gatling gun, 1865

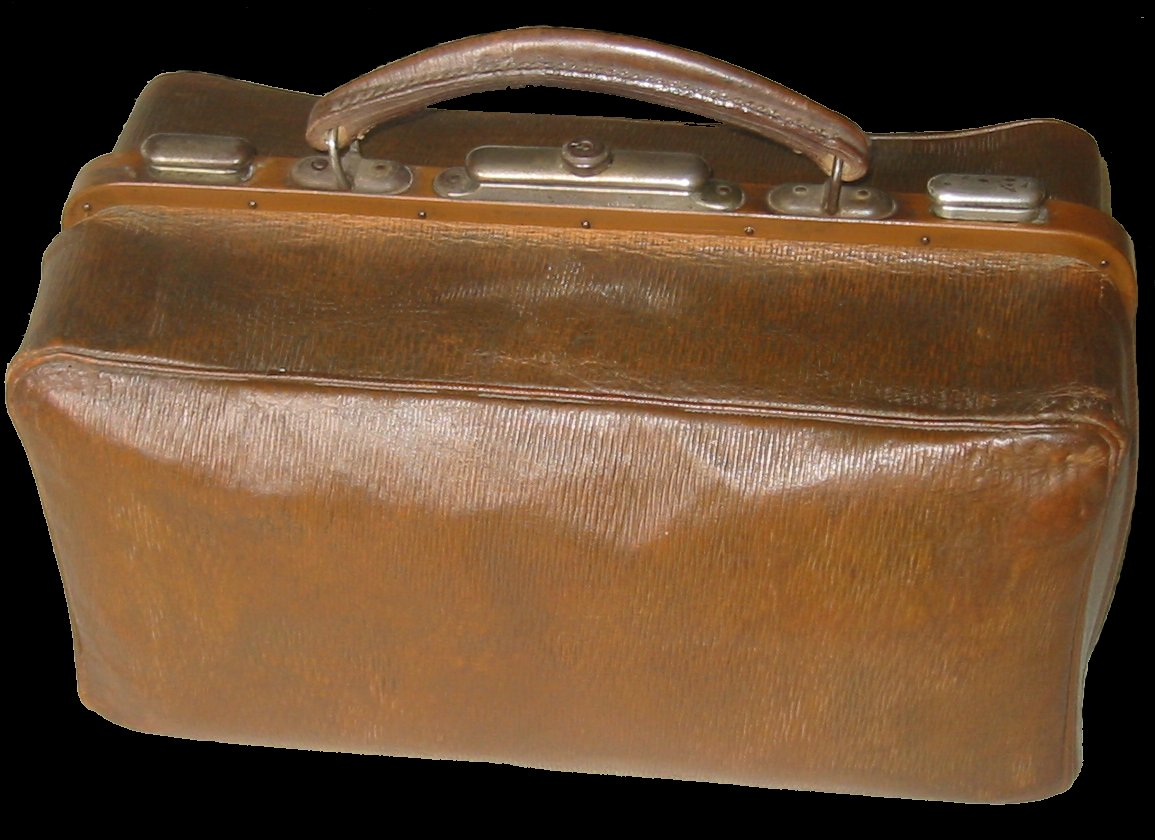
Gladstone bag

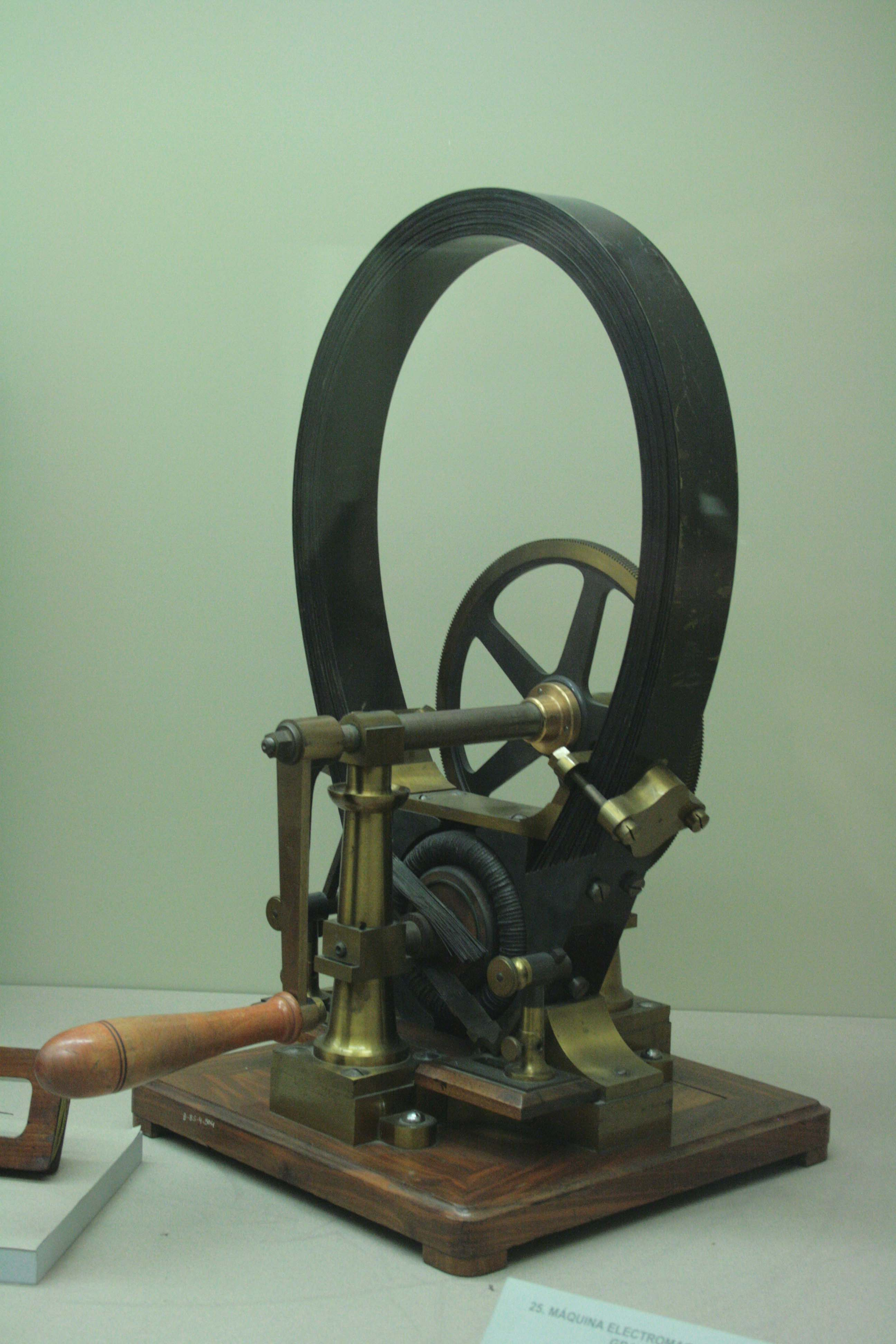
Gramme dynamo

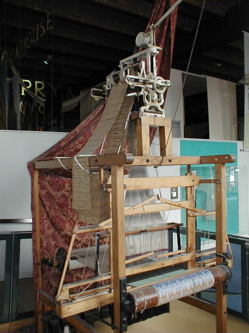
Jacquard loom

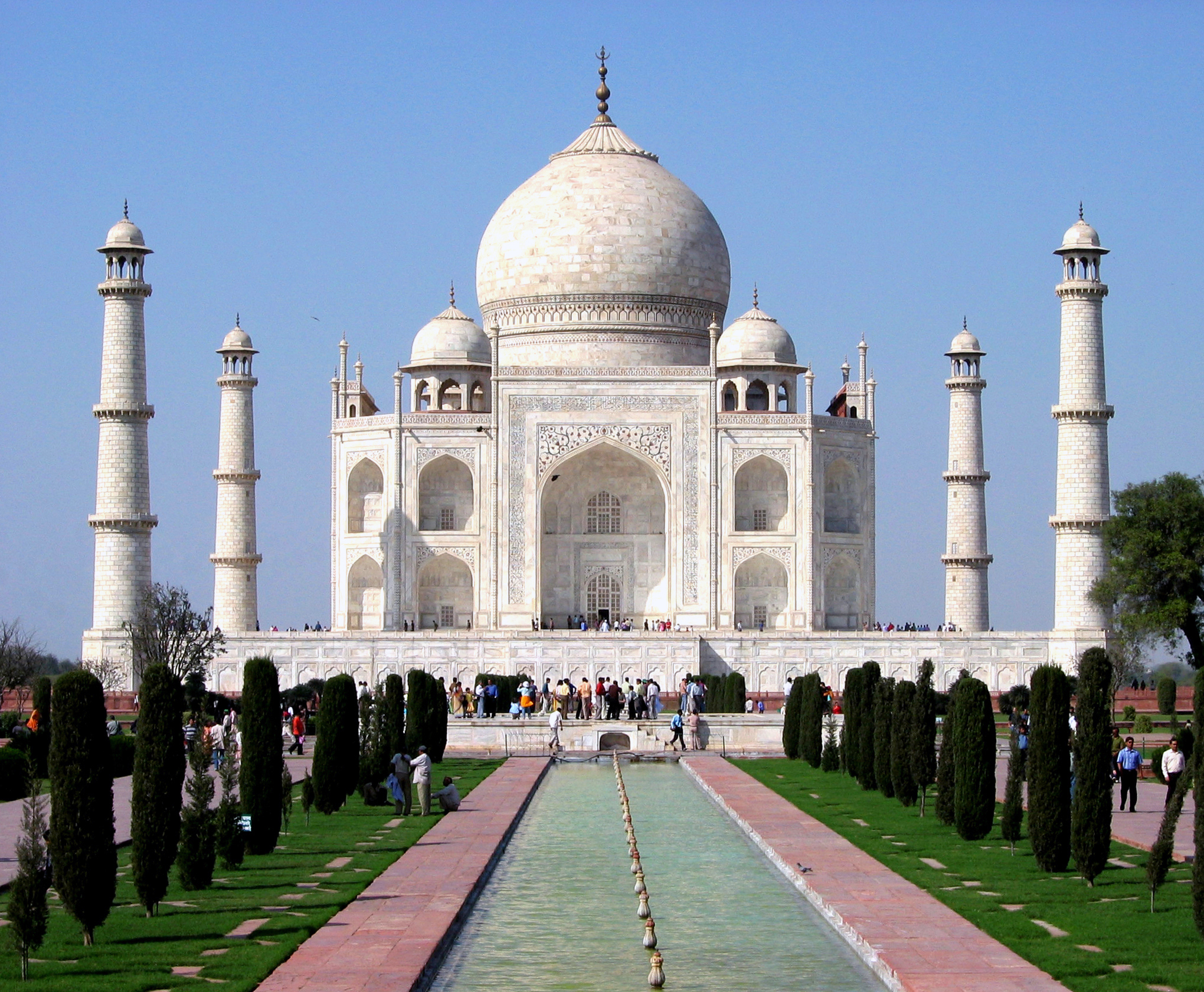
The Taj Mahal

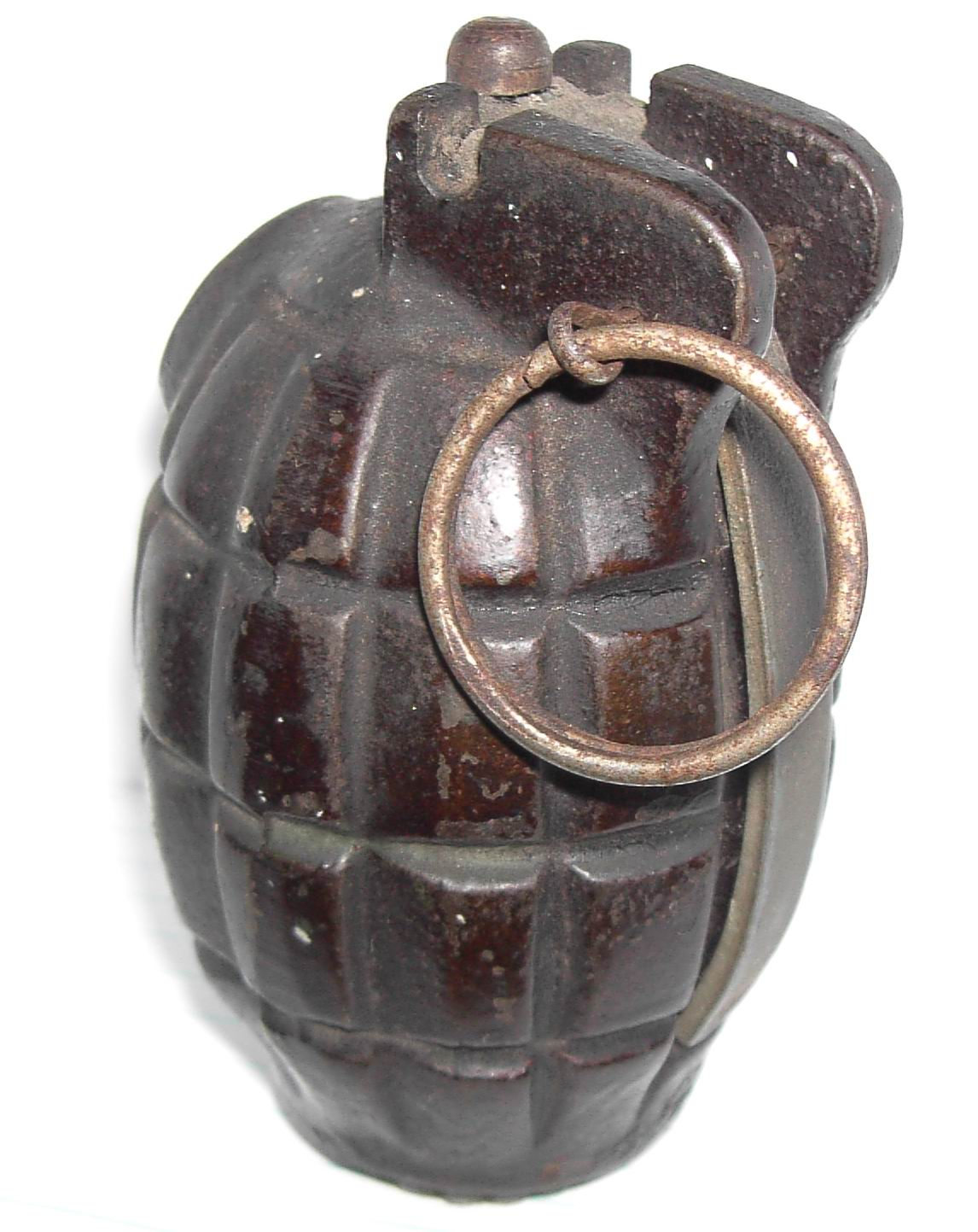
Mills bomb

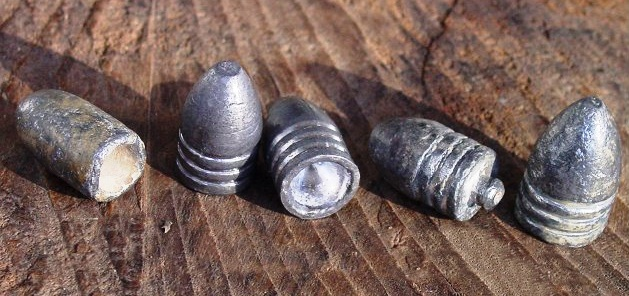
Minié balls

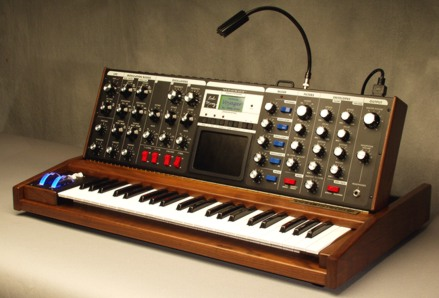
Moog synthesiser

=== N to S ===
- Napier's bones – John Napier
- Newcomen steam engine – Thomas Newcomen
- Newtonian telescope – Isaac Newton
- Newton's Cradle – Isaac Newton
- Nissen hut – Peter Norman Nissen
- Nordenfelt gun – Thorsten Nordenfelt
- Northrop Loom – James Henry Northrop
- Odhner Arithmometer – Willgodt Theophil Odhner
- Odón device – Jorge Odón
- Ormerod link – Edward Ormerod
- Ostwald viscometer – Wilhelm Ostwald
- Owen submachine gun – Evelyn Owen
- Parkesine – Alexander Parkes
- Pasteurization – Louis Pasteur
- Patchett gun – George William Patchett
- Pavlova – Anna Pavlova
- Payne's grey – William Payne
- Peavey – Joseph Peavey
- Pelton turbine – Lester Allan Pelton
- Penning trap – Frans Michel Penning
- Petri dish – Julius Richard Petri
- Phillips screw – Henry F. Phillips
- Pilates – Joseph Pilates
- Pimm's – James Pimm
- Pinchbeck – Christopher Pinchbeck
- Pintsch gas – Julius Pintsch
- Pitman shorthand – Isaac Pitman
- Pitot tube – Henri Pitot
- Plimsoll line – Samuel Plimsoll
- Prince Rupert's Drop – Prince Rupert of the Rhine
- Pulaski – Ed Pulaski
- Pupin coil – Mihajlo Idvorski Pupin
- Puretic power block – Mario Puratić
- Prusik – Karl Prusik
- Raglan sleeve – Fitzroy Somerset, 1st Baron Raglan
- Raman spectroscopy – C. V. Raman
- Rawlplug – John Joseph Rawlings
- Richter magnitude scale – Charles Francis Richter
- Ripley machine gun – Ezra Ripley
- Rorschach test – Hermann Rorschach
- Rozière balloon – Jean-François Pilâtre de Rozier
- Rubik's Cube – Ernő Rubik
- Rumford fireplace – Benjamin Thompson
- Salk vaccine – Jonas Salk
- Salter's duck – Stephen Salter
- Sam Browne belt – Sam Browne
- Sandwich – Earl of Sandwich
- Savery engine – Thomas Savery
- Saxophone – Adolphe Sax
- Scavenger's daughter – Leonard Skeffington (or Skevington)
- Scheele's Green – Carl Wilhelm Scheele
- Schick test – Béla Schick
- Shrapnel shell – Henry Shrapnel
- Snellen chart – Herman Snellen
- Sousaphone – John Philip Sousa
- Southern blot – Edwin Southern
- Soyer stove – Alexis Soyer
- Spragg Bag – Terry Spragg
- Sprengel explosives, Sprengel Pump – Hermann Sprengel
- Stabinger viscometer – Hans Stabinger
- Stanhope – Henry FitzRoy Stanhope
- Stark spectroscopy – Johannes Stark
- Stelzer engine – Frank Stelzer
- Stephenson's Rocket – Robert Stephenson
- Sten – Reginald V. Shepherd, Harold Turpin, Enfield
- Stetson – John Batterson Stetson
- Stiefografie – Helmut Stief
- Stillson wrench – Daniel Chapman Stillson
- Stirling engine – Rev. Robert Stirling
- Stockbridge damper – George H. Stockbridge
- Stokes mortar – Wilfred Stokes
- Strowger switch – Almon Brown Strowger
- Swallow float – John C. Swallow
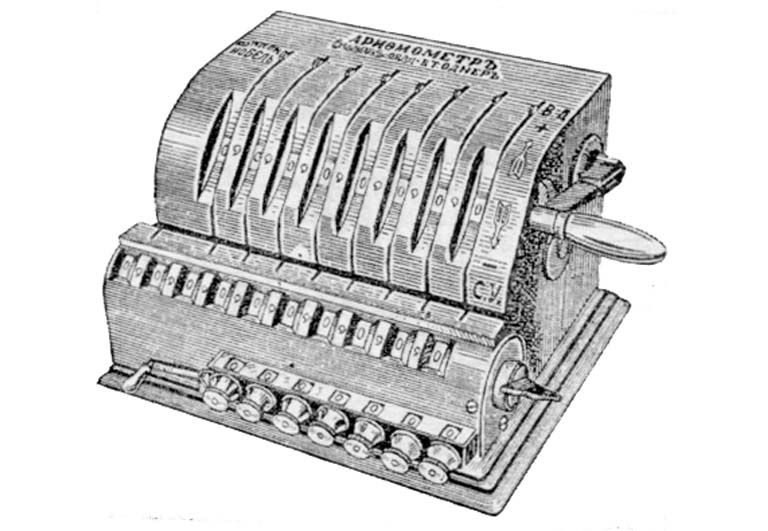
Early Odhner Arithmometer

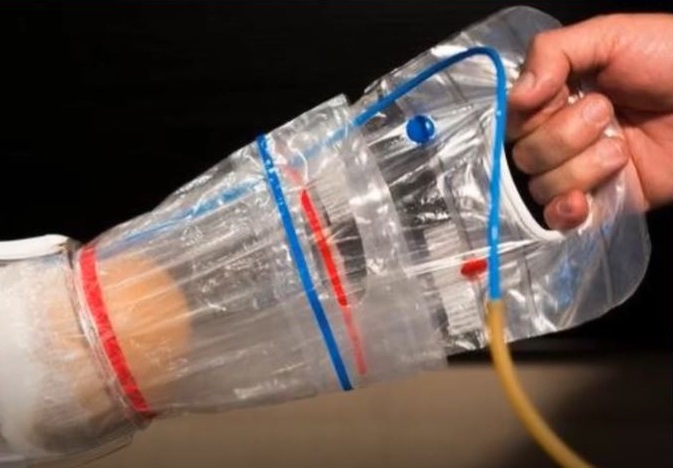
Odon device

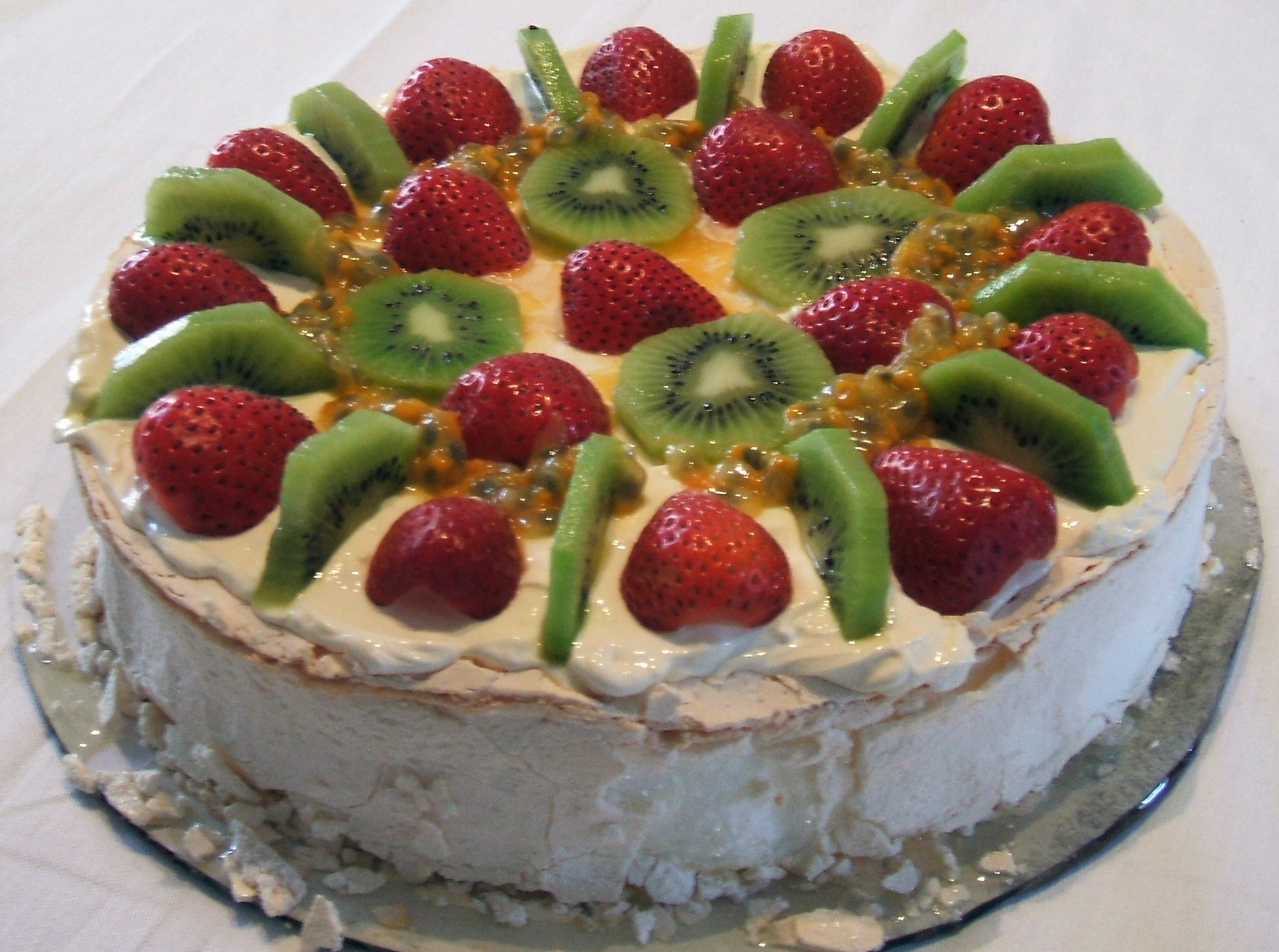
Pavlova dessert

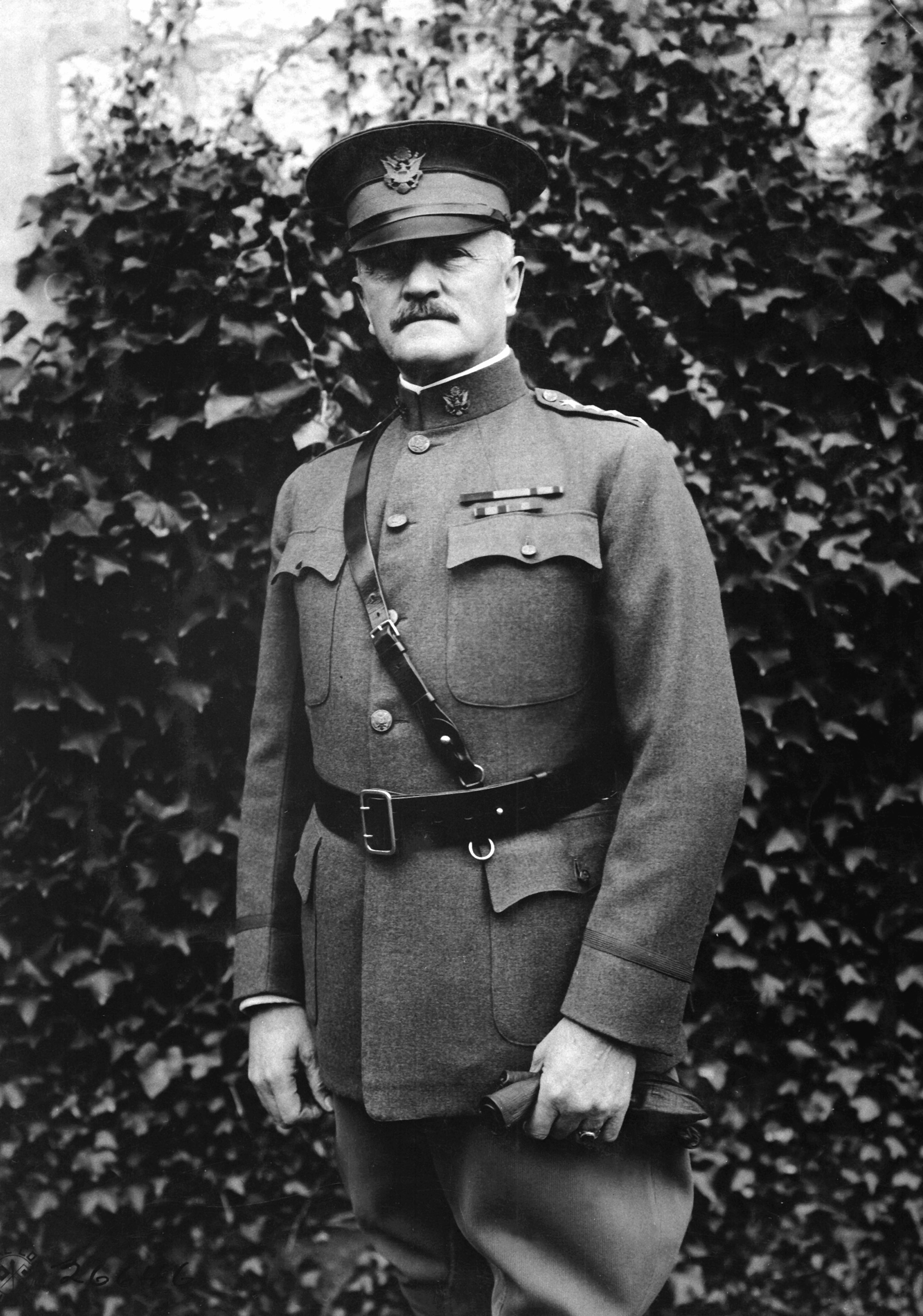
John J. Pershing wearing a Sam Browne belt

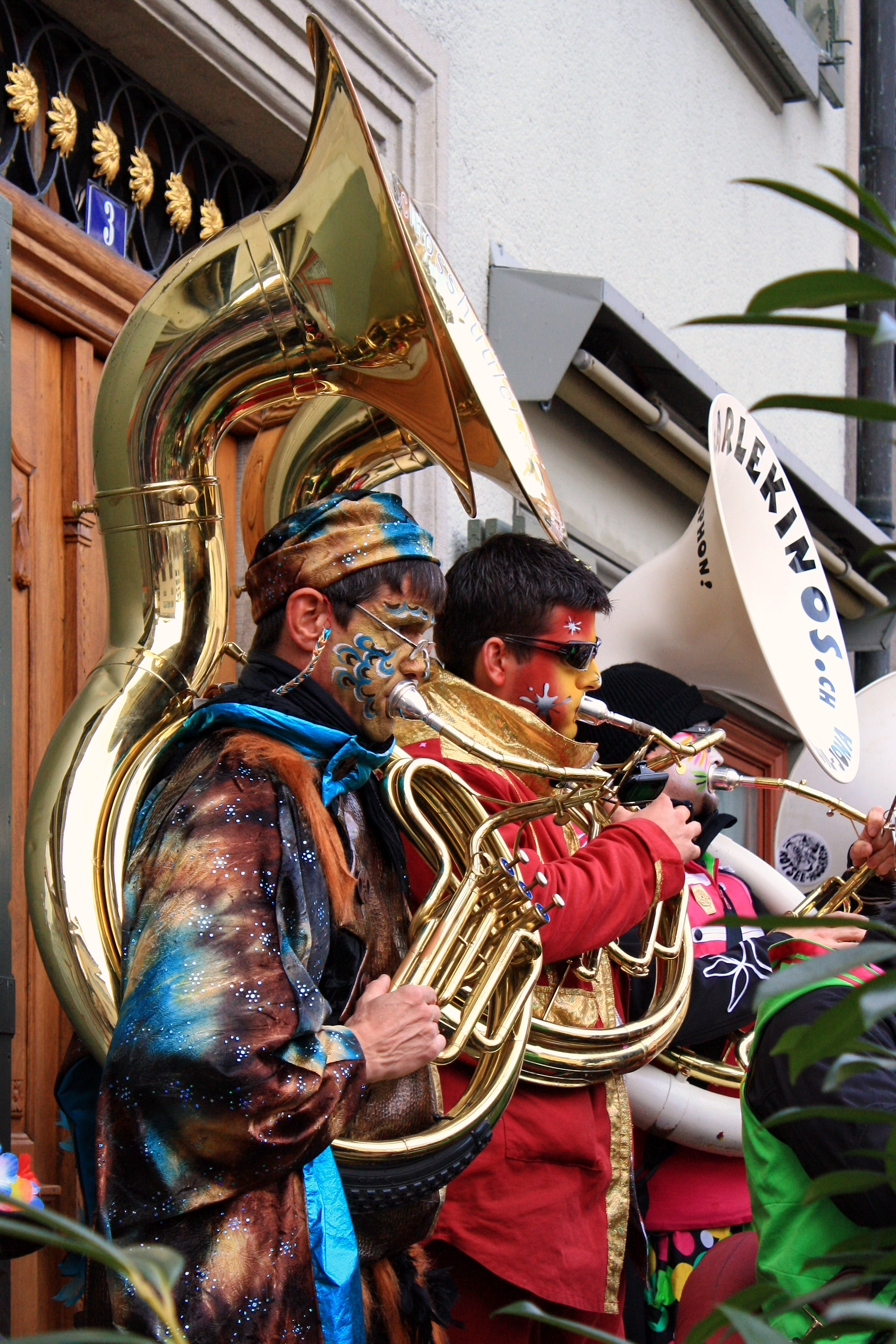
Sousaphones in Switzerland

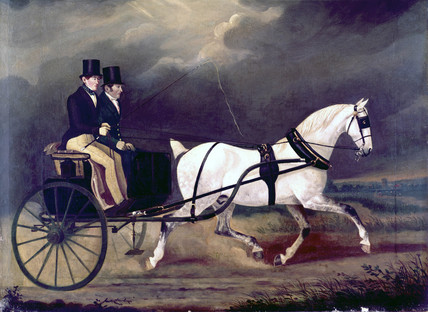
Stanhope gig

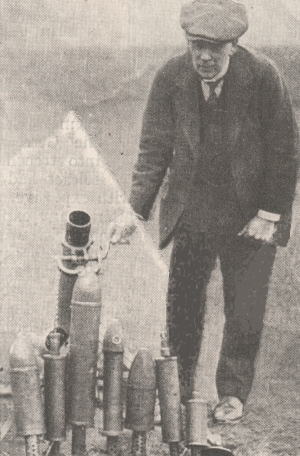
Sir Wilfred Stokes with Stokes Mortars

=== T to Z ===
- Taj Mahal – Mumtaz Mahal
- Taser – Tom Swift electric rifle
- Tesla coil, Tesla turbine – Nikola Tesla
- Theremin – Léon Theremin
- Thompson submachine gun – John T. Thompson
- Tobin tax — James Tobin
- Tupperware – Earl Silas Tupper
- Ubbelohde viscometer – Leo Ubbelohde
- Uzi – Uziel Gal
- Venn diagram – John Venn
- Vernier scale – Pierre Vernier
- Very pistol, Very flare – Edward Wilson Very
- Vigreux column – Henri Vigreux
- Voltaic pile – Alessandro Volta
- Wagner tuba – Richard Wagner
- Wankel engine – Felix Wankel
- Wardian case – Nathaniel Bagshaw Ward
- Waterhouse stop – John Waterhouse
- Watt's linkage & Watt steam engine – James Watt
- Wedgwood porcelain – Wedgwood family
- Welin breech block – Axel Welin
- Wellington boot – Duke of Wellington
- Wells turbine – Alan Arthur Wells
- Westinghouse air brake – George Westinghouse
- Weston cell – Edward Weston
- Wheatstone bridge – Charles Wheatstone
- Whitehead Torpedo – Robert Whitehead
- Whitworth thread – Joseph Whitworth
- Wiegand wire – John R. Wiegand
- Wilhelmy plate – Ludwig Wilhelmy
- Wilson chamber – Charles Thomson Rees Wilson
- Winchester rifle – Oliver Winchester
- Windsor knot – Edward VII of the United Kingdom
- Winogradsky column – Sergei Winogradsky
- Wollaston landscape lens – William Hyde Wollaston
- Wollaston wire – William Hyde Wollaston
- Woodruff key – W.N. Woodruff
- Wood's glass – Robert W. Wood
- Yablochkov candle – Pavel Yablochkov
- Yale lock – Linus Yale, Jr.
- Zamboni – Frank Zamboni
- Zamboni pile – Giuseppe Zamboni
- Zeppelin – Ferdinand von Zeppelin
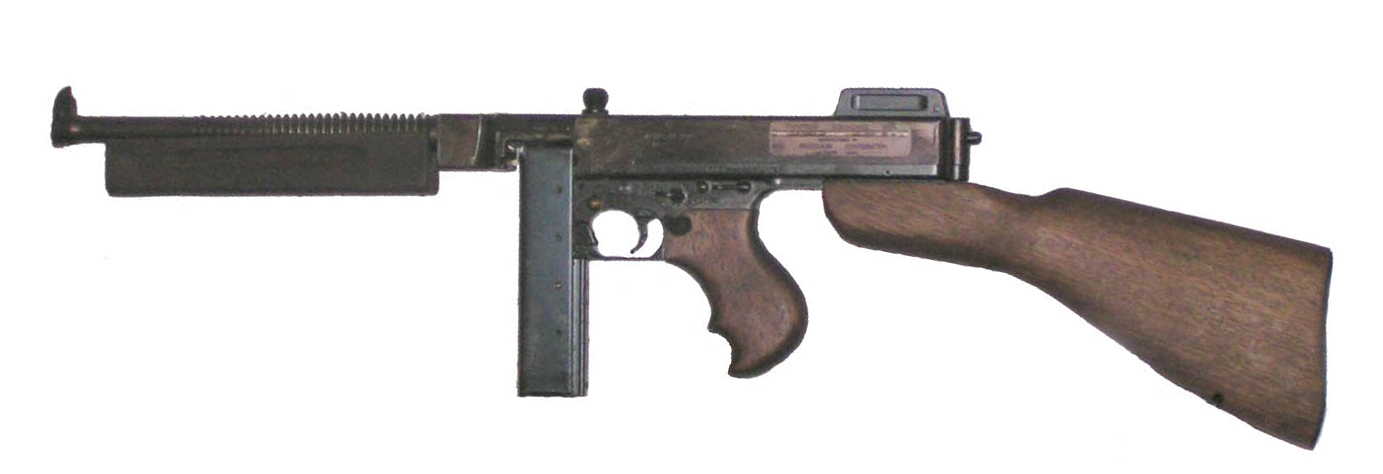
Thompson submachine gun

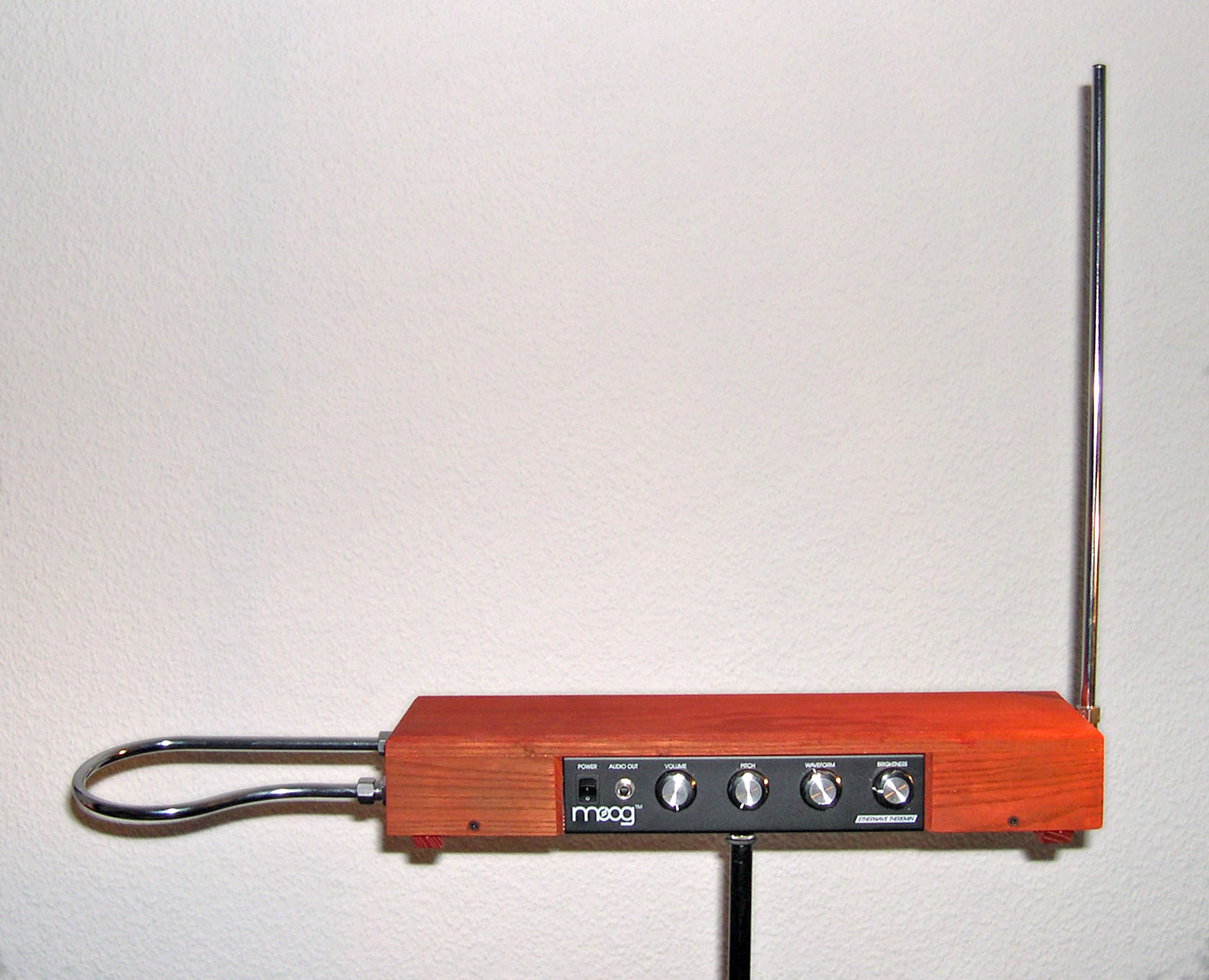
Etherwave Theremin by Robert Moog

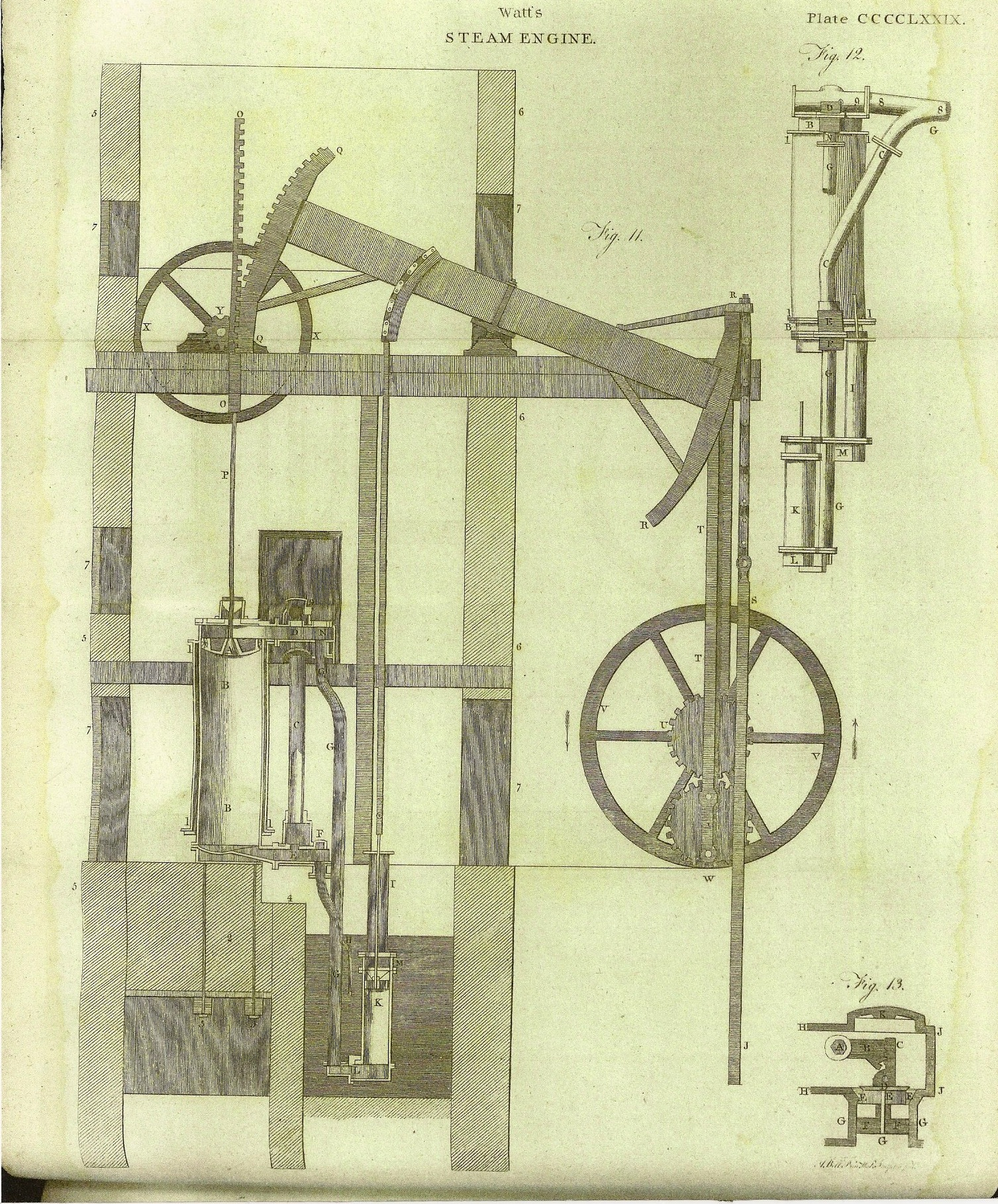
Watt steam engine

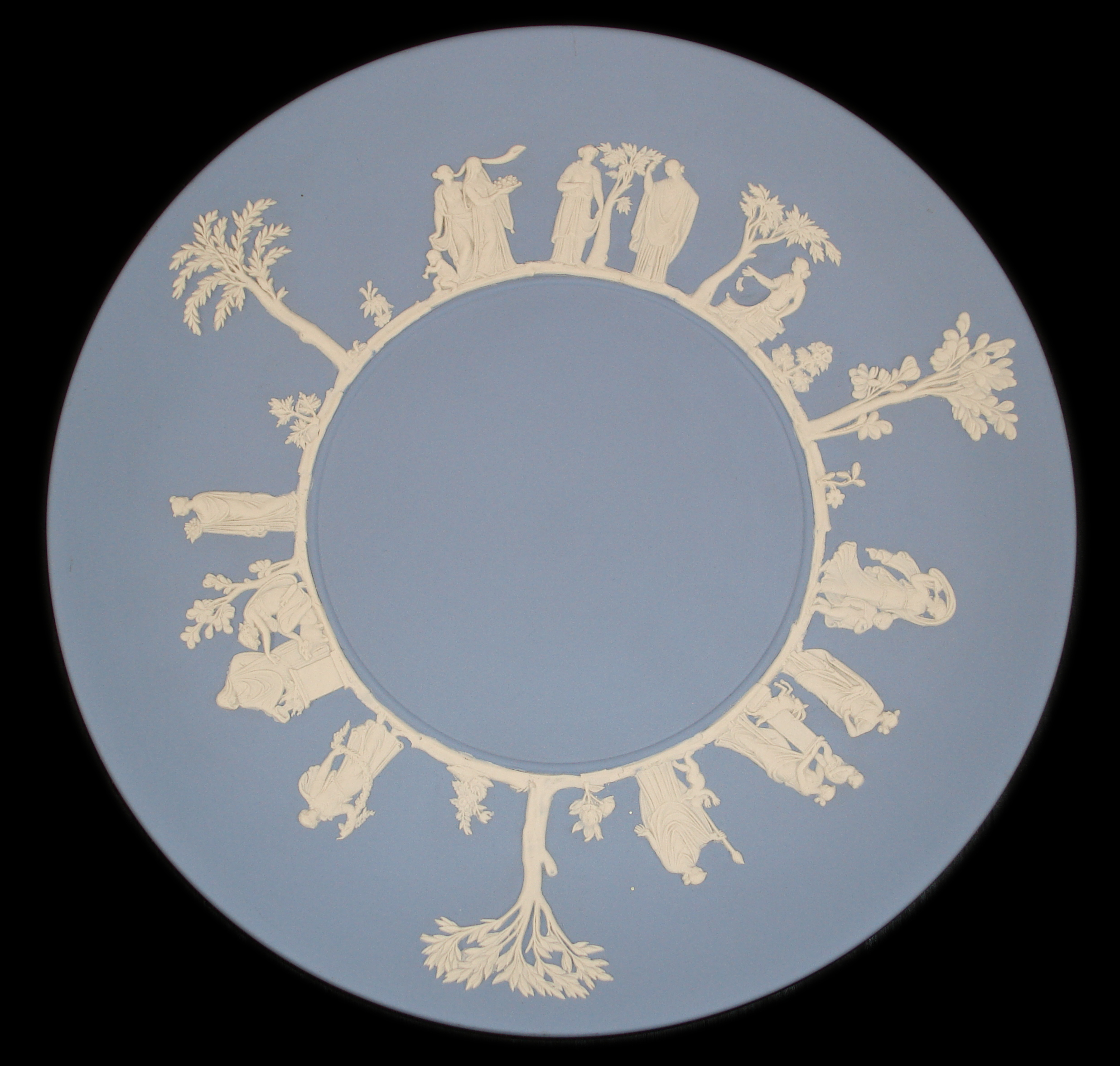
Wedgwood blue plate

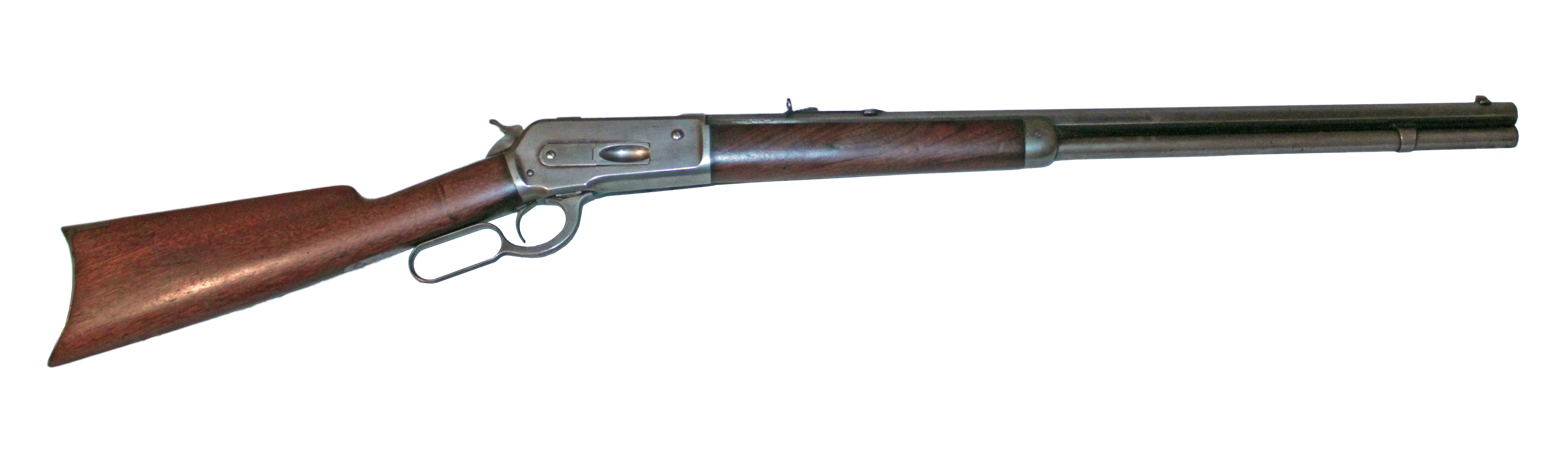
Winchester rifle, 1886

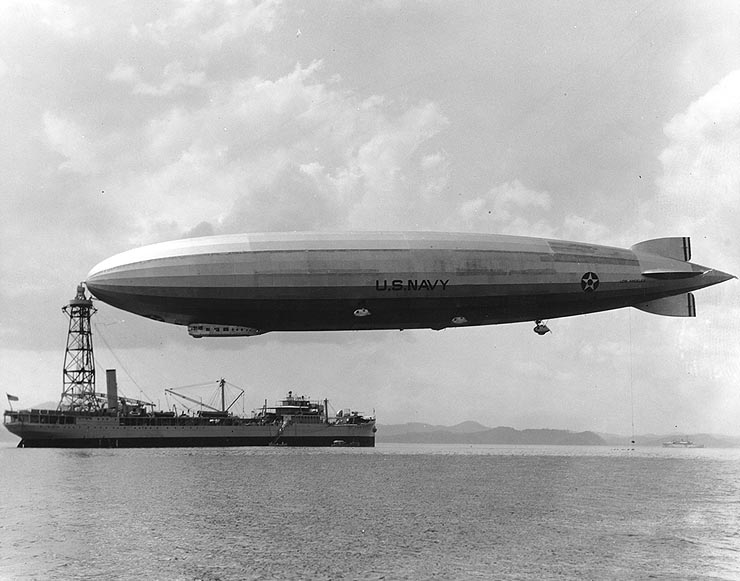
US Zeppelin

== See also ==
- List of inventors
- List of inventors killed by their own inventions
- List of inventions named after places
- Timeline of historic inventions
- List of scientists
- Lists of etymologies
- Scientific phenomena named after people
- List of named inorganic compounds
