= List of inventions named after places =

This is a list of inventions and foods named after places.

== A-G ==
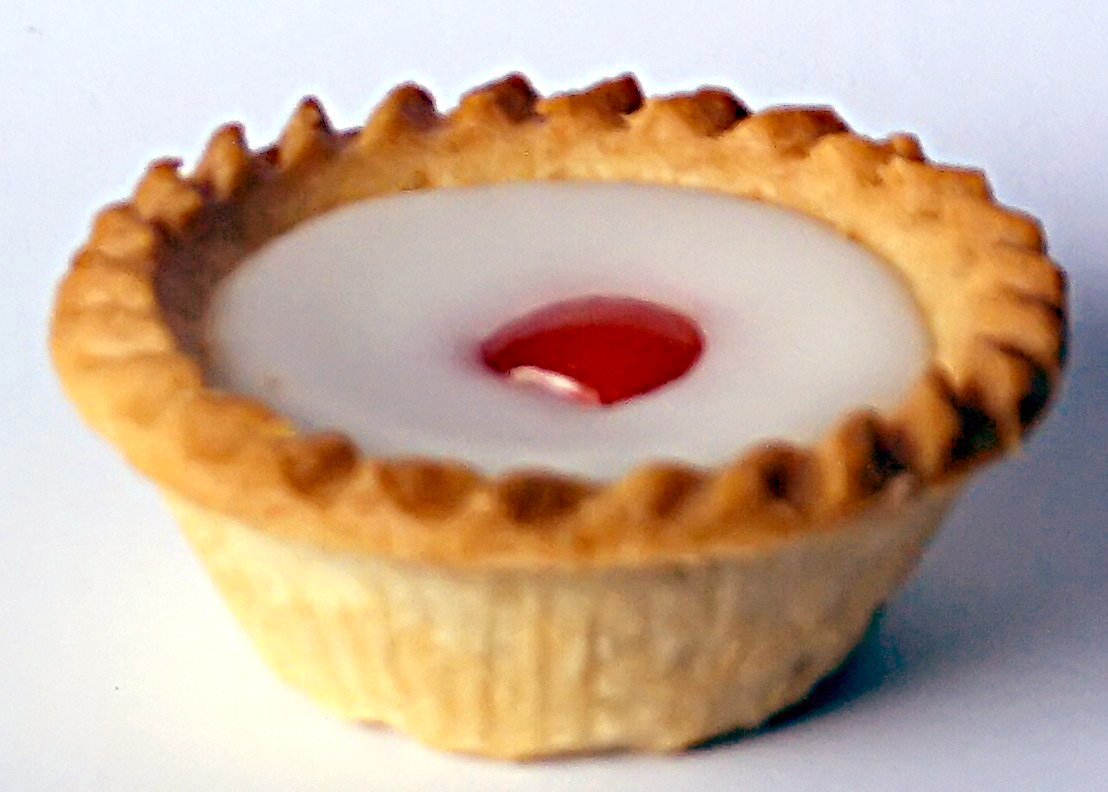
A cherry Bakewell

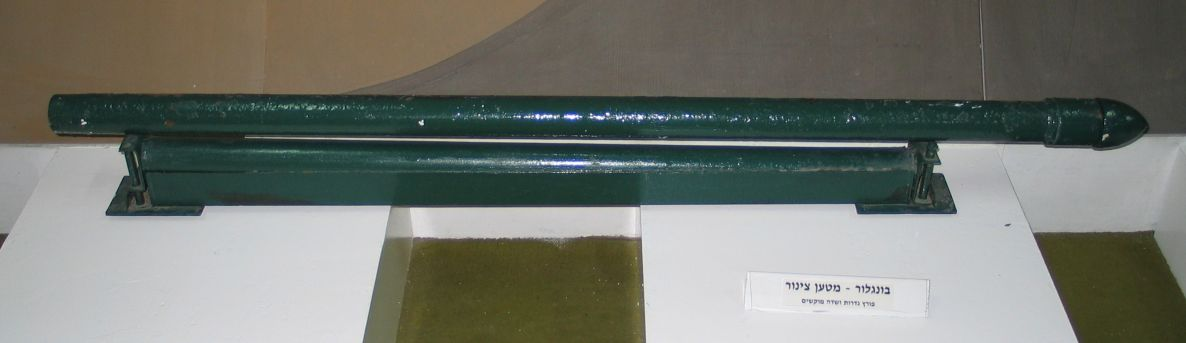
A Bangalore torpedo

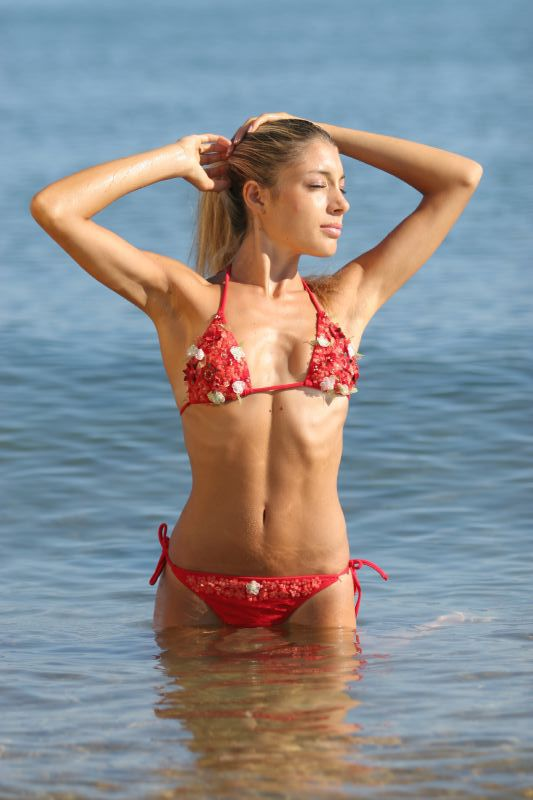
Woman wearing a bikini

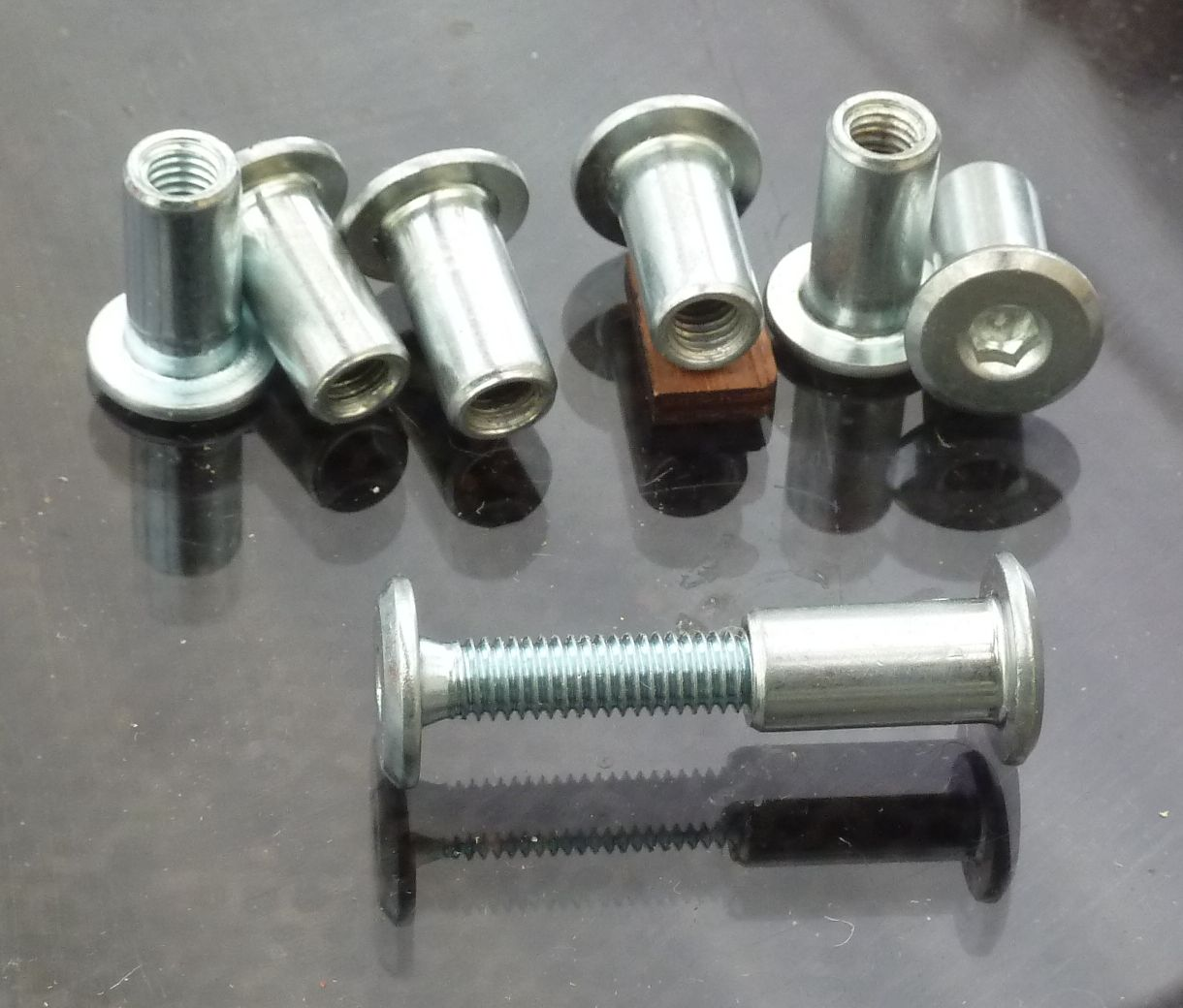
Chicago screws

- Adirondack chair – Adirondack Mountains, US
- Adirondack guideboat – Adirondack Mountains, US
- Angostura bitters – Angostura, now called Ciudad Bolivar, Venezuela
- Arbroath smokie – Arbroath, Scotland
- Axminster carpet – Axminster, Somerset, UK
- Badminton game – Badminton, Gloucestershire, UK
- Bahian guitar – Bahia, Brazil
- Bakewell tart – Bakewell, Derbyshire, UK
- Balaclava – Balaklava, Crimea, Ukraine
- Balmoral bonnet – Balmoral, Scotland
- Balmoral shoe – Balmoral, Scotland
- Bánh mì – Saigon, Vietnam
- Bangalore torpedo – Bangalore, India
- Bath bun – Bath, Somerset, UK
- Belfast truss – Belfast, Northern Ireland
- Berlin – Berlin, Germany
- Bikini – Bikini Atoll, Marshall Islands
- Blackpool rock – Blackpool, Lancashire, UK
- Bordeaux mixture – Bordeaux, France
- Bristol board – Bristol, UK
- Brummagem Ware – Birmingham, UK
- Bungalow – Bengal, India
- Cambric – Cambrai, France known as Kameryk in Dutch
- Camembert – Camembert, Orne, France
- Calico – Kozhikode, Kerala, India known as Calicut
- Cape cart – Cape of Good Hope
- Champagne – Champagne, France
- Chelsea bun – Chelsea, London, UK
- Chorley cake – Chorley, Lancashire, UK
- Chicago screw – Chicago, Illinois, US
- China – China
- Cologne – Cologne, Germany
- Cognac – Cognac, France
- Concord coach – Concord, New Hampshire, US
- Corinthian bronze – Corinth, Greece
- Cornish pasty – Cornwall, UK
- Damascus steel – Damascus, Syria
- Damask – Damascus, Syria
- Delftware – Delft, Netherlands
- Denim – Nimes, France
- Dresden Porcelain – Dresden, Germany
- Denver boot – Denver, US
- Duffel bag – Duffel, Belgium
- Dum-dum bullet – Dum Dum, West Bengal, India
- Dymkovo toy – Dymkovo settlement, Russia
- Eccles cake – Eccles, Greater Manchester, UK
- Elswick cruiser – Elswick, Tyne and Wear
- Eton crop – Eton, Berkshire, UK
- Eton mess – Eton College, Eton, Berkshire, UK
- Fedoskino miniature – Fedoskino, Russia
- Fez – Fez, Morocco
- Finnan haddie – Findon, Aberdeenshire, Scotland
- French horn – France
- Frankfurter – Frankfurt, Germany
- Gordian knot – Gordium, Turkey

== H-Q ==
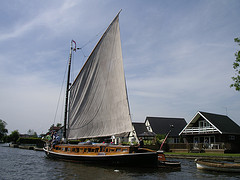
A Norfolk Wherry

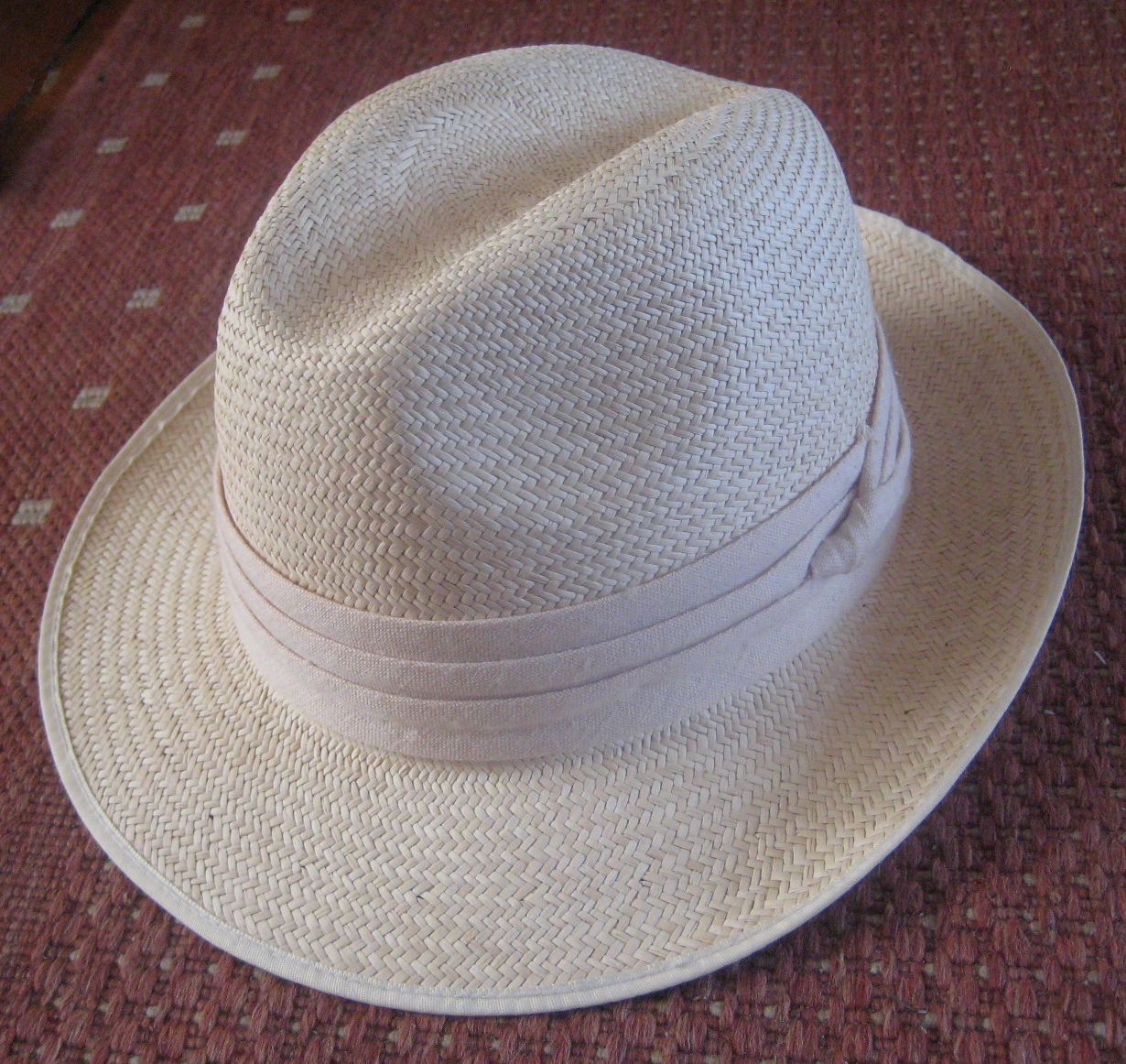
A Panama hat

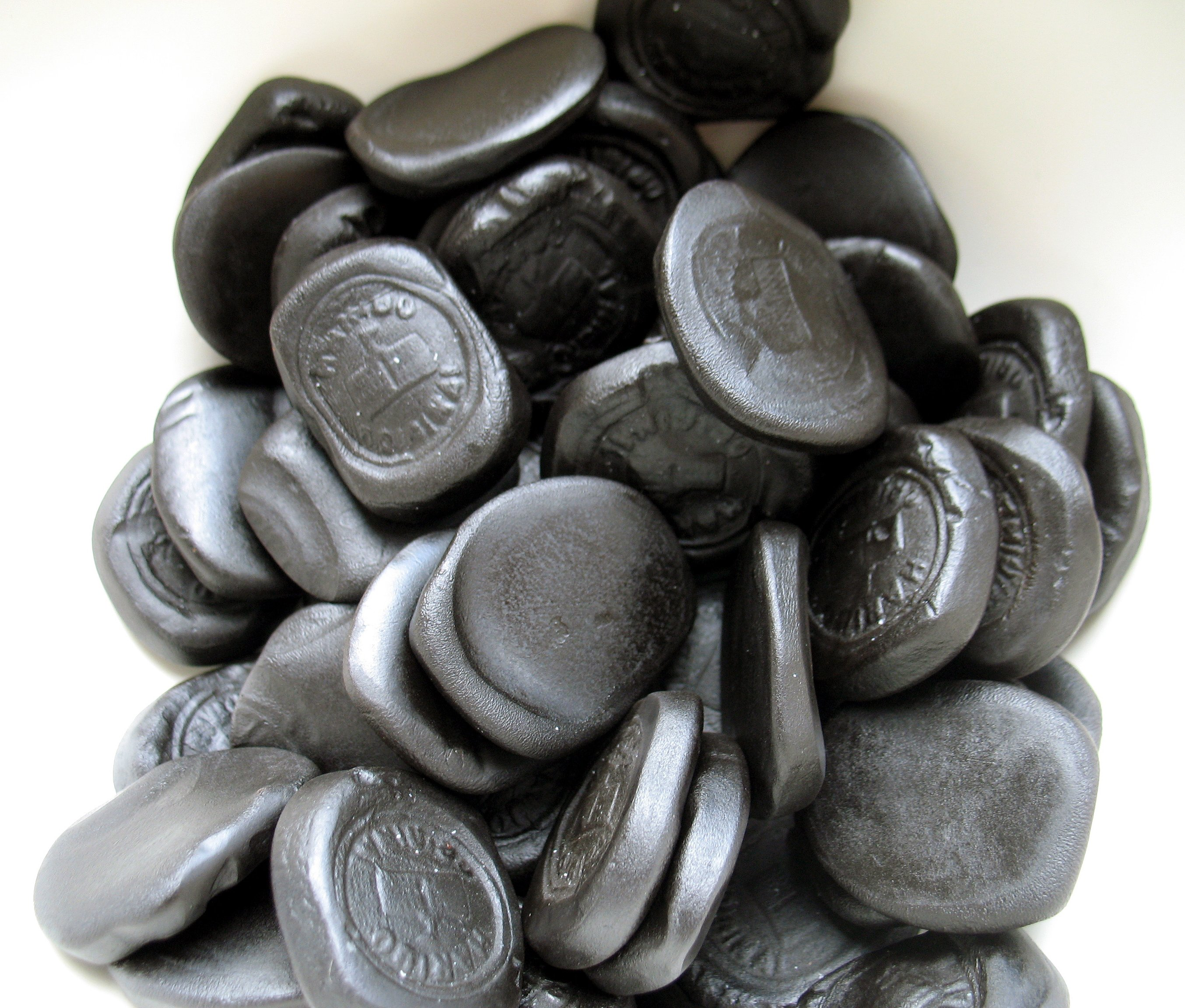
Pomfret cakes

- Hackney carriage – Hackney, London
- Hamburger – Hamburg, Germany
- Harris tweed – Harris, Outer Hebrides, Scotland
- Homburg – Bad Homburg, Germany
- Jeans – Genoa, Italy
- Jodhpurs – Jodhpur, India
- Jena glass – Jena, Germany
- Jersey barrier – New Jersey, US
- Jersey (clothing), Jersey (fabric) – Jersey
- Kentucky rifle – Kentucky, US
- Khokhloma – Khokhloma settlement, Nizhny Novgorod Oblast, Russia
- Lancashire boiler – Lancashire, UK
- Landau – Landau, Germany
- Leyden jar – Leiden, Netherlands
- Limerick – Limerick, Ireland
- Limousine – Limousin, France
- Lincoln green – Lincoln, UK
- Macassar oil – Makassar, Indonesia
- Madeira Islands – Madeira Islands via Madeira wine
- Madeira wine – Madeira Islands
- Magenta – Magenta, Lombardy
- Marathon race – Marathon, Greece
- Mayonnaise – Mahón, Menorca, Spain
- Muscovy glass – Moscow, Russia
- Nankeen – Nanking, China
- Norfolk wherry – Norfolk, UK
- Orenburg shawl – Orenburg, Russia
- Oxford bags – Oxford, UK
- Oxford brogues – Oxford, UK
- Panama hat – Panama
- Paris Green – Paris, France
- Parchment – Pergamon, Turkey
- Pilsner – Pilsen, Czech Republic
- Plaster of Paris – Paris, France
- Polonium – Poland
- Pomfret Cakes – Pontefract, Yorkshire, UK
- Port wine – Porto, Portugal
- Portland cement – Isle of Portland, Dorset, UK

== R-Z ==
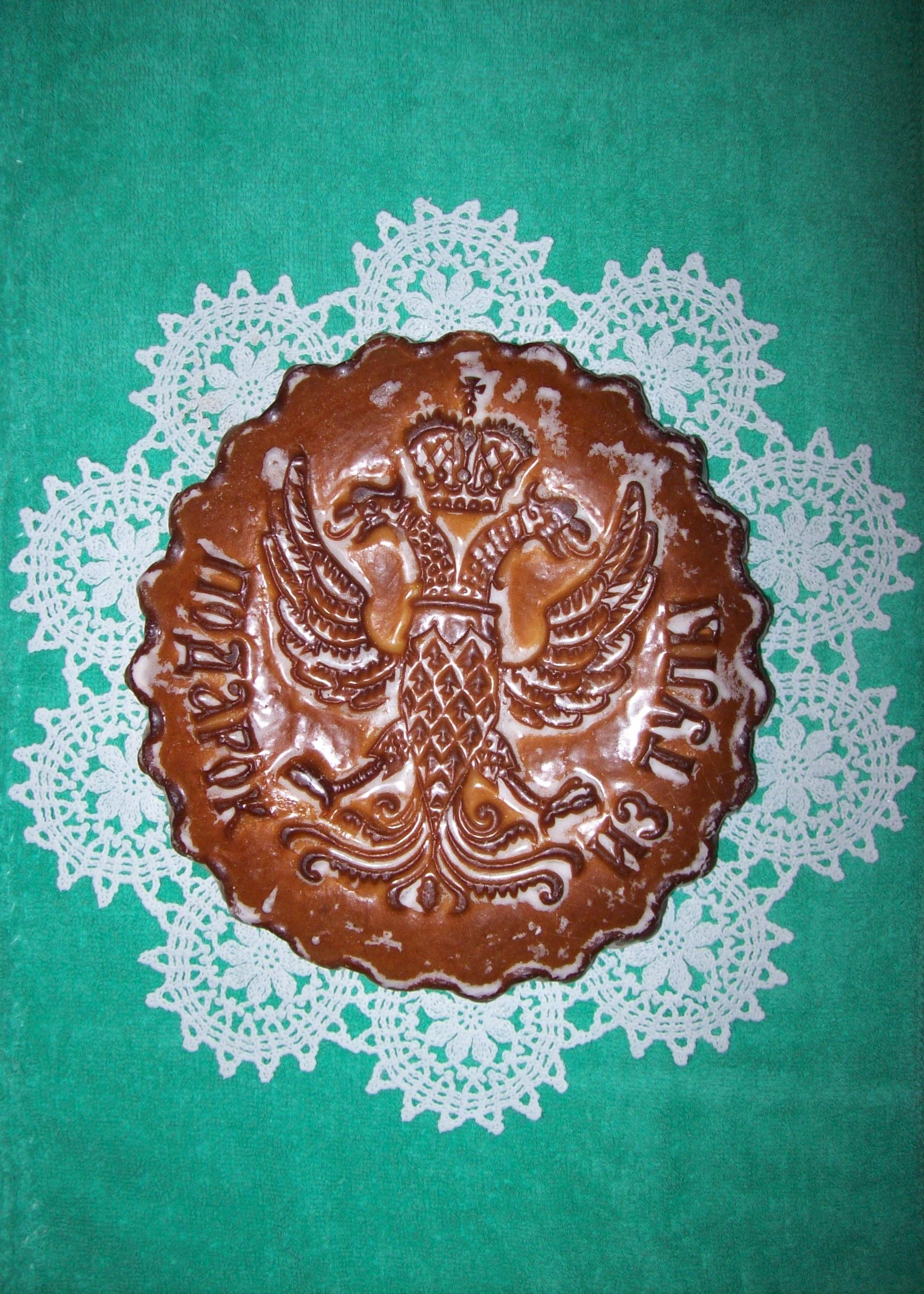
A Tula pryanik with the Coat of Arms of Russia printed.

- Roman candle (firework) – Rome, Italy
- Rugby football – Rugby, Warwickshire, UK
- Russian guitar – Russia
- Russian Mountains – Russia
- Samian ware – Samos, Greece
- Sherry – Jerez de la Frontera, Spain
- Sienna – Siena, Italy
- Surrey (carriage) – Surrey, UK
- Trojan horse – Troy, Turkey
- Tula pryanik – Tula, Russia
- Tulle (netting) – Tulle, France
- Venetian blind – Venice, Italy
- Venetian glass – Venice, Italy
- Yorkshire pudding – Yorkshire, UK
- Worcester sauce – Worcester, UK
- Worsted – Worstead, Norfolk, UK
- Zhostovo painting – Zhostovo, Russia

== See also ==
- List of inventions named after people
- List of inventors
- List of inventors killed by their own inventions
