= Carl Emil Krarup =

Danish telegraph engineer

- Born: 12 October 1872; Copenhagen, Denmark
- Died: 29 December 1909 (aged 37)
- Known for: Continuously loaded cable
- Scientific career
- Fields: Engineering
- Institutions: Danish Telegraph Administration

Carl Emil Krarup (12 October 1872 – 29/30 December 1909) was a Danish telegraph engineer who is chiefly known for the invention of a kind of loaded cable, eponymously called Krarup cable, which made improvements in the transmission of telephone signals, especially on submarine cables.

== Career ==
Krarup was originally a civil engineer. He was in charge of public works in Copenhagen until 1898 when he joined the Danish Telegraph Administration. In 1901 he conducted research on loaded lines at the University of Würzburg in Germany. Returning to Denmark he continued the theoretical work at the University of Copenhagen and published a paper in 1902.

== Krarup cable ==
Krarup cable is a method of loading lines to reduce their distortion. All practical methods of loading add series inductance to the cable to try to meet the Heaviside condition for no signal distortion. Krarup cable consists of iron wires wound tightly around the copper conducting cores and it is the iron that is the source of the additional inductance. However, it still does not have sufficient inductance to fully meet the Heaviside condition. Its construction also makes it expensive compared to the previously existing method of adding discrete loading coils at intervals along the cable. Against this, Krarup cable is lighter and easier to lay. The weight of early submarine cables using loading coils could cause excessive stress in the cable if not handled carefully. Additionally, Krarup cable has none of the problems of sealing the joins against seawater which was a major problem with loading coils before modern polymers began to be used.

For these reasons, Krarup cable was popular on shorter distances, where the distortion was not so high that loading coils had to be used, until the advent of permalloy cable superseded it. The first cable to be laid with Krarup cable, indeed the first cable to be laid with any kind of continuous loading, was between Helsingør (Denmark) and Helsingborg (Sweden) in 1902. This cable was engineered by Krarup himself.
