= C10H8O2 =

The molecular formula C_{10}H_{8}O_{2} may refer to:

- Dihydroxynaphthalenes
  - 1,3-Dihydroxynaphthalene
  - 1,4-Dihydroxynaphthalene
  - 1,5-Dihydroxynaphthalene, one of several isomers of dihydroxynaphthalene
  - 2,6-Dihydroxynaphthalene
- Methylcoumarin, isomer in which a methyl group substitutes for a hydrogen atom in coumarin
