= C10H6O3 =

The molecular formula C_{10}H_{6}O_{3} (molar mass: 174.15 g/mol, exact mass: 174.0317 u) may refer to:

- Juglone, or 5-hydroxy-1,4-naphthalenedione
- Lawsone, or 2-hydroxy-1,4-naphthoquinone
