= Naphthalenedisulfonic acid =

Naphthalenedisulfonic acid refers to organic compounds with the formula C_{10}H_{6}(SO_{3}H)_{2}. They are derivatives of naphthalene. Twelve isomers are possible, but only a few have been examined in some depth, often as precursors to azo dyes or to various drugs. They are colorless solids with high solubility in water. Some derivatives are prepared by sulfonation of naphthalene or its monosulfonic acids. A few are produced by indirect routes.

Hydroxynaphthalenesulfonic acids
name	Registry number	m.p., °C	prep	Precursor to	
1,3-Naphthalenedisulfonic acid	6094-26-4	250	deamination 2-aminonaphthalene-6,8-disulfonic acid	obscure	
1,5-Naphthalenedisulfonic acid, Armstrong acid	81-04-9	240-245	sulfonation of naphthalene with oleum (together with 1,6-isomer)	1-hydroxynaphthalene-5-sulfonic acid, 1,5-dihydroxynaphthalene, 1,3,5-naphthalenetrisulfonic acid	
1,6-Naphthalenedisulfonic acid	525-37-1	125	sulfonation of naphthalene with oleum (together with 1,5-isomer)	1,6-dihydroxynaphthalene, 1,3,6-naphthalenetrisulfonic acid	
1,7-Naphthalenedisulfonic acid	5724-16-3	?	low T sulfonation of naphthalene-2-sulfonic acid in low yields	obscure	
2,6-Naphthalenedisulfonic acid	581-75-9	?	high T sulfonation of naphthalene	2-hydroxynaphthalene-6-sulfonic acid and 2,6-dihydroxynaphthalene	
2,7-Naphthalenedisulfonic acid	92-41-12	?	high T sulfonation of naphthalene	2-hydroxynaphthalene-7-sulfonic acid, 2,7-dihydroxynaphthalene	-
1-Aminonaphthalene-8-hydroxy-2,4-disulfonic acid (Chicago acid)	82-47-3	?	base hydrolysis of naphthosultam-2,4-disulfonic acid	precursor to C.I. Direct Blue 1 199, Direct Blue 22, Direct Blue 76	

In addition to these compounds, several naphthalenetrisulfonic acids are known as well as several hydroxy derivatives.
