= Hydroxynaphthalenesulfonic acid =

Hydroxynaphthalenesulfonic acid refers to organic compounds with the formula C_{10}H_{6}(SO_{3}H)(OH). Several are precursors to azo dyes and to various aminonaphthalenesulfonic acids. They are colorless solids with high solubility in water.

Hydroxynaphthalenesulfonic acids
name	Registry number	m.p., °C	prep	Precursor to
1-Hydroxynaphthalene-2-sulfonic acid "Baum’s acid"	567-18-0	250	by low T sulfonation of 1-naphthol together with 4-hydroxynaphthalene-2-sulfonic acid	
1-Hydroxynaphthalene-3-sulfonic acid	3771-14-0	?	acid hydrolysis of 1-aminonaphthalene-3-sulfonc acid	
1-Hydroxynaphthalene-4-sulfonic acid "Nevile and Winther’s acid", "N&W acid"	84-87-7	170	by low T sulfonation of 1-naphthol together with 4-hydroxynaphthalene-2-sulfonic acid	C.I. Acid Orange 19, C.I. Mordant Brown 35, C.I. Food Red 3
1-Hydroxynaphthalene-5-sulfonic acid "oxyL acid", "Azurin acid"	117-59-9	azurin acid	base hydrolysis of 1,5-naphthalenedisulfonic acid	C.I. Pigment Red 54, C.I. Mordant Black 29
1-Hydroxynaphthalene-6-sulfonic acid	16500-22-4	?	obscure	
1-Hydroxynaphthalene-7-sulfonic acid	20191-62-2	?	obscure	desulfonation of 1-hydroxy-2,7- and 1-hydroxy-4,7-disulfonic acids
1-Hydroxynaphthalene-8-sulfonic acid	117-22-6	106 (monohydrate)	?	C.I. Acid Black 54, C.I. Acid Blue 158
2-Hydroxynaphthalene-1-sulfonic acid "oxy Tobias acid", "Stebbins acid"	567-47-5	115	low T sulfonation of 2-naphthol	2-aminonaphthalene-1-sulfonic acid (Tobias acid)
2-Hydroxynaphthalene-3-sulfonic acid	16435-40-8	?	obscure	
2-Hydroxynaphthalene-4-sulfonic acid	6357-85-3	?	by desulfonation of 2-hydroxynaphthalene-4,8-di-sulfonic acid	
2-Hydroxynaphthalene-5-sulfonic acid	20386-27-0	?	obscure	
2-Hydroxynaphthalene-6-sulfonic acid	93-01-6	129 (monohydrate)	sulfonation of 2-naphthol	C.I. Acid Orange 12, C.I. Food Yellow 3, C.I. Food Orange 2
2-Hydroxynaphthalene-7-sulfonic acid "Cassella's acid"	RN [92-40-0	89 (monohydrate)	?	2-aminonaphthalene-7-sulfonic acid ,2-hydroxynaphthalene-3,7-disulfonic acid, 2,7-dihydroxynaphthalene
2-Hydroxynaphthalene-8-sulfonic acid croceic acid	132-57-0	?	C.I. Acid Red 25	

== Related compounds ==
In addition to these compounds, several dihydroxynaphthalenes, naphthalenedisulfonic acids, naphthalenetrisulfonic acids, hydroxynaphthalenedisulfonic acids, hydroxynaphthalenetrisulfonic acids, and aminonaphthalenesulfonic acids are valuable.
