= 1-Hydroxynaphthalene-4-sulfonic acid =

Names
- Other names Nevile and Winther’s acid, NW acid 1-Naphthol-4-sulfonic acid

Identifiers
CAS Number	84-87-7
3D model (JSmol)	Interactive image
ChEMBL	ChEMBL2312197
ChemSpider	6533
ECHA InfoCard	100.001.426
EC Number	201-568-4
PubChem CID	6791
UNII	6W41U3C9YN
CompTox Dashboard (EPA)	DTXSID2058910
- InChI: InChI=1S/C10H8O4S/c11-9-5-6-10(15(12,13)14)8-4-2-1-3-7(8)9/h1-6,11H,(H,12,13,14) Key: HGWQOFDAUWCQDA-UHFFFAOYSA-N
- SMILES: C1=CC=C2C(=C1)C(=CC=C2S(=O)(=O)O)O

Properties
Chemical formula	C_{10}H_{8}O_{4}S
Molar mass	224.23 g·mol^{−1}
Appearance	white solid

Hazards
- GHS labelling
Pictograms	(GHS07: Exclamation mark)
Signal word	Warning
Hazard statements	H315, H319
Precautionary statements	P264, P264+P265, P280, P302+P352, P305+P351+P338, P321, P332+P317, P337+P317, P362+P364
- Except where otherwise noted, data are given for materials in their standard state (at 25 °C [77 °F], 100 kPa). Infobox references

1-Hydroxynaphthalene-4-sulfonic acid is an organic compound with the formula C_{10}H_{6}(OH)SO_{3}H. It is one of 14 hydroxynaphthalenesulfonic acids. It is a colorless solid. It is a precursor to azo dyes Acid orange 19, Mordant Brown 35, and Food Red 3.
