= NPPD =

NPPD may refer to:

- New Product and Process Development
- Nebraska Public Power District
- National Protection and Programs Directorate
- Nitrophenyl pentadienal (5-(4-nitrophenyl)-2,4-pentadienal), colloquially known as 'spydust', a chemical compound used as a tagging agent by the KGB during the Cold War Soviet era
