= Bulkhead (barrier) =

Anti-flooding structure

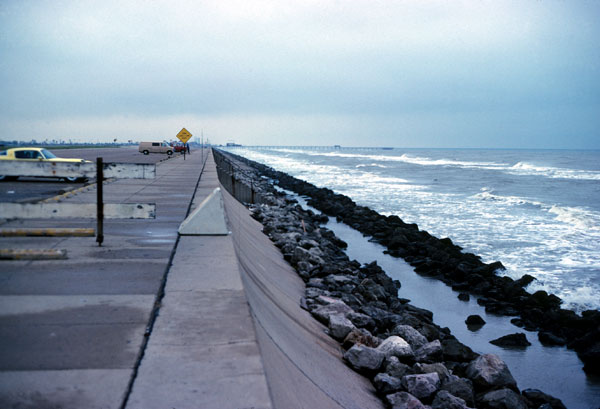
This example of multiple structures includes a massive seawall and riprap revetment.

A bulkhead is a retaining wall, such as a bulkhead within a ship or a watershed retaining wall. It may also be used in mines to contain flooding.

Coastal bulkheads are most often referred to as seawalls, bulkheading, or riprap revetments. These manmade structures are constructed along shorelines with the purpose of controlling beach erosion. Construction materials commonly used include wood pilings, commercially developed vinyl products, large boulders stacked to form a wall, or a seawall built of concrete or another hard substance.

Coastal property owners typically seek to develop bulkheads in an attempt to slow large landslide erosion caused by wave action.

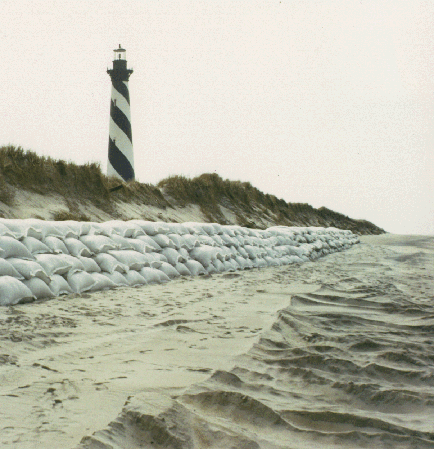
The Cape Hatteras lighthouse stands behind a seawall of sandbags that temporarily stabilized the eroding shore; wave action destroyed the seawall soon after it was built.

Studies over recent decades have resulted in public awareness as to potential negative effects that bulkheads may bring to beaches and the interconnected habitat areas of fish, plants, and birds. Many states have enacted laws to protect beaches to allow for future use of the beaches, as well as protect these natural habitats.

The term bulkhead is also used in a similar but distinct context to refer to large pressure sealing isolation barriers which can be retroactively installed for temporary or permanent use during maintenance or construction activities.

== Effects ==
While bulkheads may serve their purpose to slow erosion at a bluff or beachfront, they commonly cause a domino effect of change to the beach profile. The increased wave reflection caused by their presence can result in an increased re-suspension of sand in the water in front of the bulkhead. This can lead to more sand being distributed in the alongshore direction, away from the beach profile. Due to coastal littoral drift, the sand would then instead be distributed toward the ends of the bulkheads, leaving larger gravel and sometimes bedrock in place of the once sandy beach.

Since sand is a natural habitat for several species of fish to lay their eggs and is also the only surface in which eelgrass can take root, these natural processes can no longer take place in this now sand-stripped location. The absence of eelgrass means that the spawning habitat for herring and the protection for juvenile salmon would no longer be present. This new sand-stripped habitat also encourages other species, such as kelp, to move in.

== Gallery ==
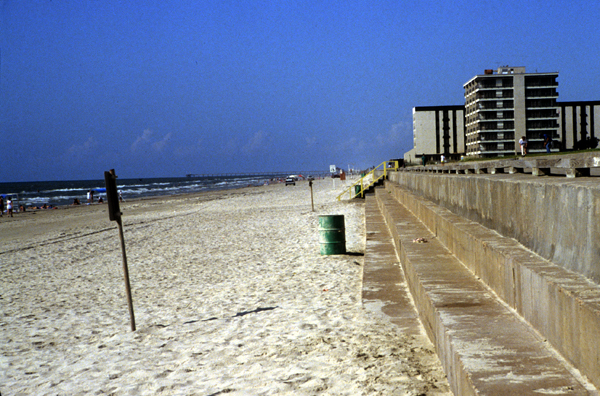
Seawall on North Padre Island constructed in the backbeach to protect condominiums from storm waves and beach erosion. Central Texas

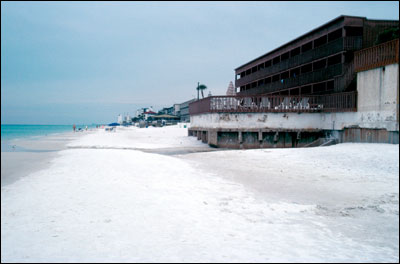
Seawall protecting homes from storm waves and beach erosion. Northwestern Panhandle of Florida

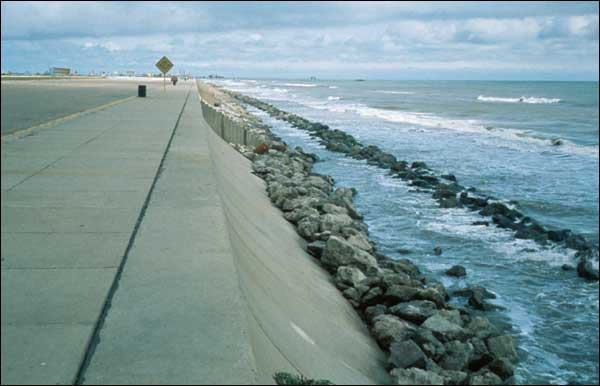
Hard structures, such as the Galveston seawall, can increase erosion of adjacent beaches.

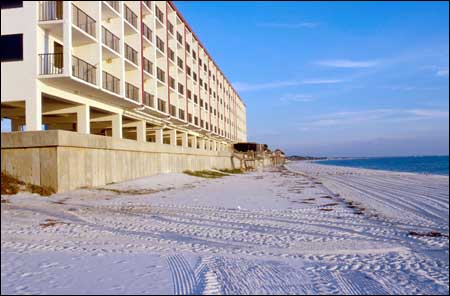
Seawall protecting homes from storm waves and beach erosion. Eastern Panhandle of Florida

== See also ==
- Bulkhead line
- Riprap
- Root wall
- Seawall
