= Nitrophenyl pentadienal =

Names
- Preferred IUPAC name (2E,4E)-5-(4-Nitrophenyl)penta-2,4-dienal

Identifiers
CAS Number	49678-09-3; 2608-48-2 (non-specific)
3D model (JSmol)	Interactive image
ChemSpider	4757534
PubChem CID	5940153
UNII	DY58Y5T5YN
CompTox Dashboard (EPA)	DTXSID6025773
- InChI: InChI=1S/C11H9NO3/c13-9-3-1-2-4-10-5-7-11(8-6-10)12(14)15/h1-9H/b3-1+,4-2+ Key: BKLWQDSDJBFRDF-ZPUQHVIOSA-N
- SMILES: c1cc(ccc1/C=C/C=C/C=O)[N+](=O)[O-]

Properties
Chemical formula	C_{11}H_{9}NO_{3}
Molar mass	203.197 g·mol^{−1}
- Except where otherwise noted, data are given for materials in their standard state (at 25 °C [77 °F], 100 kPa). Infobox references

Nitrophenyl pentadienal, nitrophenylpentadienal, NPPD, or METKA (Russian for "mark") colloquially known as "spy dust", is a chemical compound used as a tagging agent by the KGB during the Cold War Soviet Era. Soviet authorities in Moscow tracked Americans by applying an almost invisible powder to their clothing, cars, doorknobs and other objects. Some other variants of "spy dust" may have contained luminol and would glow under ultraviolet light.

== History ==
Spy dust was first discovered in England in the 1930s.

It was first revealed to the Central Intelligence Agency in Moscow in 1963 by Alexander Chrepanov, a KGB walk-in agent.

Spy dust was detected in the Soviet Union in 1970s in tiny quantities.

In 1984, KGB officer Sergei Votontsov (Code name GT/COWL) provided a sample of the substance.

Soviet defector Vitaly Yurchenko confirmed the chemical.

In the summer of 1985 the powder began to appear in Moscow in much larger quantities. Concerned about the health effects of the substance, the United States State Department publicly protested to the Soviets. It was later determined that the health threat was low.

Beginning about 2005-2015, a chemical tracking kit for law enforcement agencies was developed using NPPD. To detect NPPD a 0.1% methanol solution of naphthoresorcinol is added to a swab of the item in question and then concentrated hydrochloric acid is added. The observation of a red color indicates a positive test. Naphthoresorcinol was frequently used in early organic chemistry investigations to determine the presence of aldehyde groups in solution; a red adduct is formed in acidic solution.
