= Lawsone =

- Skeletal formula

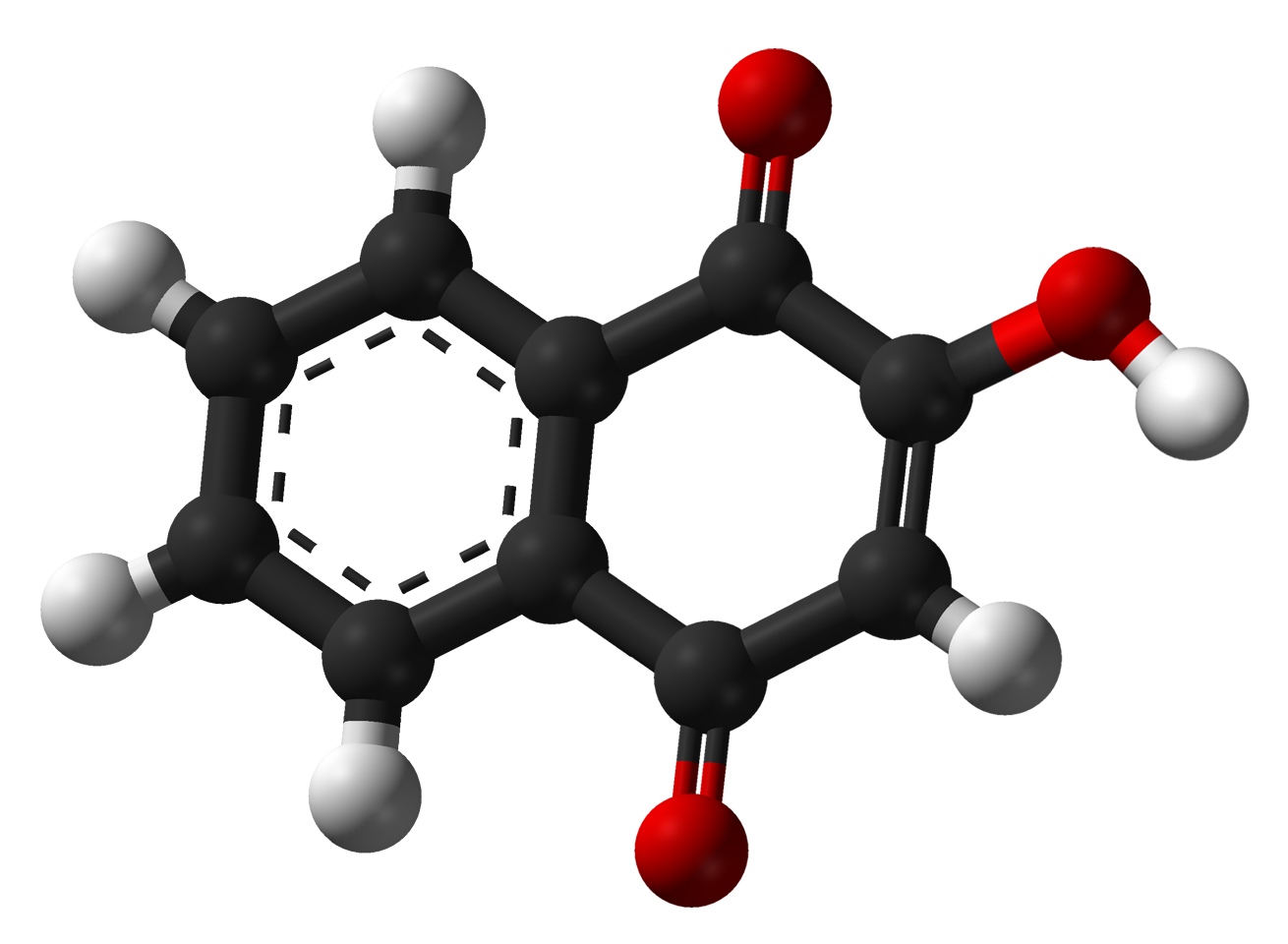
- ball-and-stick model

Names
- Preferred IUPAC name 2-Hydroxynaphthalene-1,4-dione
- Other names 2-Hydroxy-1,4-naphthoquinone; Hennotannic acid Natural Orange 6 C.I. 75480

Identifiers
CAS Number	83-72-7
3D model (JSmol)	Interactive image
Beilstein Reference	1565260
ChEBI	CHEBI:44401
ChEMBL	ChEMBL240963
ChemSpider	10430995
DrugBank	DB04744
ECHA InfoCard	100.001.361
EC Number	201-496-3
Gmelin Reference	4828
KEGG	C10368
PubChem CID	6755
UNII	TLH4A6LV1W
CompTox Dashboard (EPA)	DTXSID2025428
- InChI: InChI=1S/C10H6O3/c11-8-5-9(12)10(13)7-4-2-1-3-6(7)8/h1-5,12H Key: CSFWPUWCSPOLJW-UHFFFAOYSA-N; InChI=1/C10H6O3/c11-8-5-9(12)10(13)7-4-2-1-3-6(7)8/h1-5,12H Key: CSFWPUWCSPOLJW-UHFFFAOYAK
- SMILES: O=C(C(O)=C1)C2=C(C=CC=C2)C1=O

Properties
Chemical formula	C_{10}H_{6}O_{3}
Molar mass	174.15 g/mol
Appearance	Yellow prisms
Melting point	195 to 196 °C (383 to 385 °F; 468 to 469 K) (decomposition)
Solubility in water	almost insoluble

Hazards
- GHS labelling
Pictograms	(GHS07: Exclamation mark) (GHS08: Health hazard)
Signal word	Warning
Hazard statements	H315, H319, H335
Precautionary statements	P201, P202, P261, P264, P270, P271, P280, P281, P301+P312, P302+P352, P304+P340, P305+P351+P338, P308+P313, P312, P330, P332+P313, P337+P313, P362, P403+P233, P405, P501
- Lethal dose or concentration (LD, LC)
LD_{50} (median dose)	100 mg/kg

Related compounds
Related naphthoquinones	Juglone
- Except where otherwise noted, data are given for materials in their standard state (at 25 °C [77 °F], 100 kPa). verify (what is ?) Infobox references

Lawsone (2-hydroxy-1,4-naphthoquinone), also known as hennotannic acid, is a red-orange dye present in the leaves of the henna plant (Lawsonia inermis), for which it is named, as well as in the common walnut (Juglans regia) and water hyacinth (Pontederia crassipes). Humans have used henna extracts containing lawsone as hair and skin dyes for more than 5,000 years. In addition to henna, lawsone has been identified in several species of the genus Impatiens, including Impatiens balsamina (garden balsam) and Impatiens glandulifera (Himalayan balsam). Lawsone reacts chemically with the protein keratin in skin and hair via a Michael addition reaction, resulting in a strong permanent stain that lasts until the skin or hair is shed. Darker colored staining is due to more lawsone–keratin interactions occurring, which evidently break down as the concentration of lawsone decreases and the tattoo fades. Lawsone strongly absorbs UV light, and aqueous extracts can be effective sunless tanning agents and sunscreens. Lawsone is a 1,4-naphthoquinone derivative, an analog of hydroxyquinone containing one additional ring.

Lawsone isolation from Lawsonia inermis can be difficult due to its easily biodegradable nature. Isolation involves four steps:

1. extraction with an extraction solution, usually NaOH
2. column filtration using a macroporous adsorption resin
3. a rinse with ethanol to remove impurities, and finally
4. freeze the product to isolate the lawsone powder, usually a yellow colored dust.

During the rinse, the lawsone will be the bottom as it has such a high density and the chlorophyll molecules will all be on the top of the mixture.

Lawsone is hypothesized to undergo a reaction similar to Strecker synthesis in reactions with amino acids. Recent research has been conducted on lawsone's potential applications in the forensic science field. Since lawsone shows many similarities with ninhydrin, the current reagent for latent fingerprint development, studies have been conducted to see if lawsone can be used in this field. As of now the research is inconclusive, but optimistic. Lawsone non-specifically targets primary amino acids, and displays photoluminescence with forensic light sources. It has a characteristic purple/brown coloration as opposed to the purple/blue associated with ninhydrin. Lawsone shows promise as a reagent for fingerprint detection because of its photoluminescence maximized at 640 nm, which is high enough that it avoids background interference common for ninhydrin.

The biosynthesis of lawsone differs from that of other plant-derived 1,4-naphthoquinones, such as Juglone. Isotope-labeling studies suggest that lawsone is formed through the asymmetric incorporation of o-succinylbenzoate (OSB), followed by the oxidative decarboxylation of 1,4-dihydroxy-2-naphthoic acid (DHNA) by an enzyme that has not yet been identified. Also, Lawsone has been identified as a substrate of NAD(P)H quinone dehydrogenase 1 (NQO1), an enzyme involved in cellular redox regulation. Its interaction with NQO1 can initiate redox cycling in CD8-positive T cells. Another article reports, Lawsone-mediated NQO1 activity promotes AKT–FOXO1 signaling.

Research finds Lawsone exhibits antioxidant activity in C6 glioblastoma cells, and has a weaker cytotoxic effect than some other tested naphthoquinones, including plumbagin and menadione.

== Related compounds ==
The naphthoquinones lawsone methyl ether and methylene-3,3'-bilawsone are some of the active compounds in Impatiens balsamina leaves. Juglone is a structural isomer used as a brown dye.

Atovaquone is a synthetic antimicrobial agent that can be manufactured from lawsone.
