= Henry Edward Armstrong =

British chemist

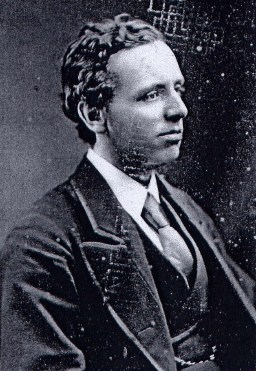
- Henry Edward Armstrong as a young man
- Born: 6 May 1848; Lewisham, Kent, England
- Died: 13 July 1937 (aged 89); Lewisham, London, England
- Awards: Davy Medal (1911); Fellow of the Royal Society
- Scientific career
- Fields: Chemistry
- Doctoral advisor: Hermann Kolbe
- Doctoral students: Martin Lowry

Henry Edward Armstrong FRS FRSE (Hon) (6 May 1848 – 13 July 1937) was a British chemist. Although Armstrong was active in many areas of scientific research, such as the chemistry of naphthalene derivatives, he is remembered today largely for his ideas and work on the teaching of science. Armstrong acid is named for him.

== Life and work ==
Armstrong was born the son of Richard Armstrong, a commission agent and importer, and Mary Ann Biddle. He lived most of his life in Lewisham, a suburb of London.

After finishing school in 1864 at age 16, he spent a winter in Gibraltar, with a relative, for health reasons. In the spring of 1865, Armstrong returned to England and entered the Royal College of Chemistry in London, now the department of chemistry at Imperial College. Chemical training in those days was not lengthy, and at the age of 18 he was selected by Edward Frankland to assist in devising methods of determining organic impurities in sewage.

Armstrong pursued further studies under Hermann Kolbe at Leipzig, earning a PhD in 1869 for work on "acids of sulfur." He returned to London and worked under Augustus Matthiessen in the medical school of St Bartholomew's Hospital, in charge of chemistry classes for students taking the London degree. A permanent appointment in 1879 at City and Guilds of London Institute, now also a part of Imperial College, followed. At age 36, Armstrong became Professor of Chemistry at yet another Imperial College precursor, the Central Institution in 1884. It was here that he established a three-year diploma course in chemical engineering, "seeing the need for a more scientific attitude of mind among British industrialists"

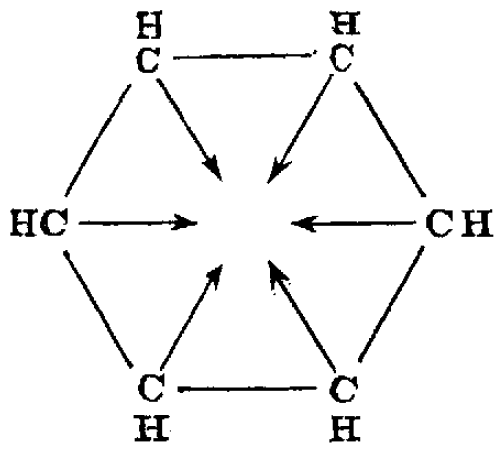
Armstrong's centric structure for benzene

He had already started on the systematic synthesis, degradation, and structural constitution of many naphthalene derivatives in 1881, building on earlier work on benzene derivatives and Erlenmeyer's proposal for the structure of naphthalene. W. P. Wynne was his most important collaborator; their 263 naphthalene samples, accrued over several decades, are now preserved at Imperial College as the Armstrong-Wynne Collection. This research on naphthalene gave much impetus to the synthetic dye industry.

Armstrong's later researches dealt with terpenes, particularly camphor, with water purification, helping to eradicate typhoid fever, and with crystallography.

In 1887, Armstrong became interested in classifying substituents of benzene in terms of their meta- and ortho-para directing influences. It was in a footnote to an article on that theme in 1890 that his centric formula for benzene first appeared. His six affinities acting within a cycle predated both the discovery of the electron and modern theories of aromaticity. Armstrong recognised that affinities have direction and are not merely point particles, and so he might be said to have anticipated parts of the wave mechanical theories of the 1920s.

He died at his home in Granville Park, Lewisham.

== Family ==
Armstrong married Frances Louisa Lavers on 30 August 1877. They had seven children, four boys and three girls, all of whom survived him. His wife died shortly before he did in her 93rd year.

== Honours and affiliations ==
- Fellow of the Royal Society (1876)
- Chemical Society of London, President (1893–1895)
- Davy Medal (1911)
- Messel medal of the Society of Chemical Industry (1922)
- Horace Brown Medal (1926)
- Albert Medal (1930)

== Collections ==
University College London Special Collections holds an archive of research by Armstrong into the works of German chemist August Kekhule. The collection includes articles, correspondence, and reviews and was compiled between 1929 - 1930.
