= Armstrong acid =

Armstrong's acid
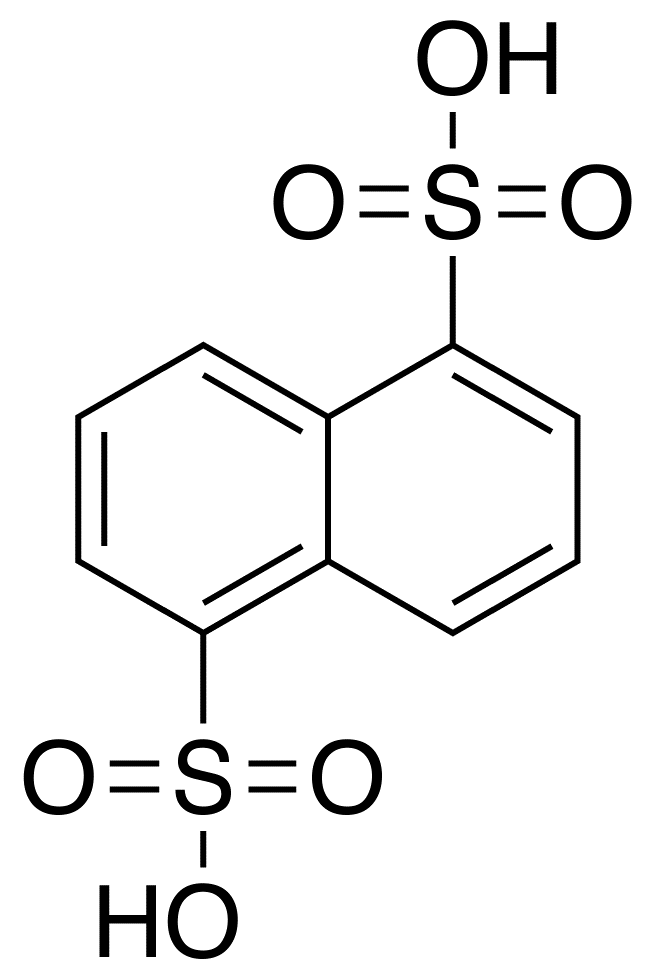

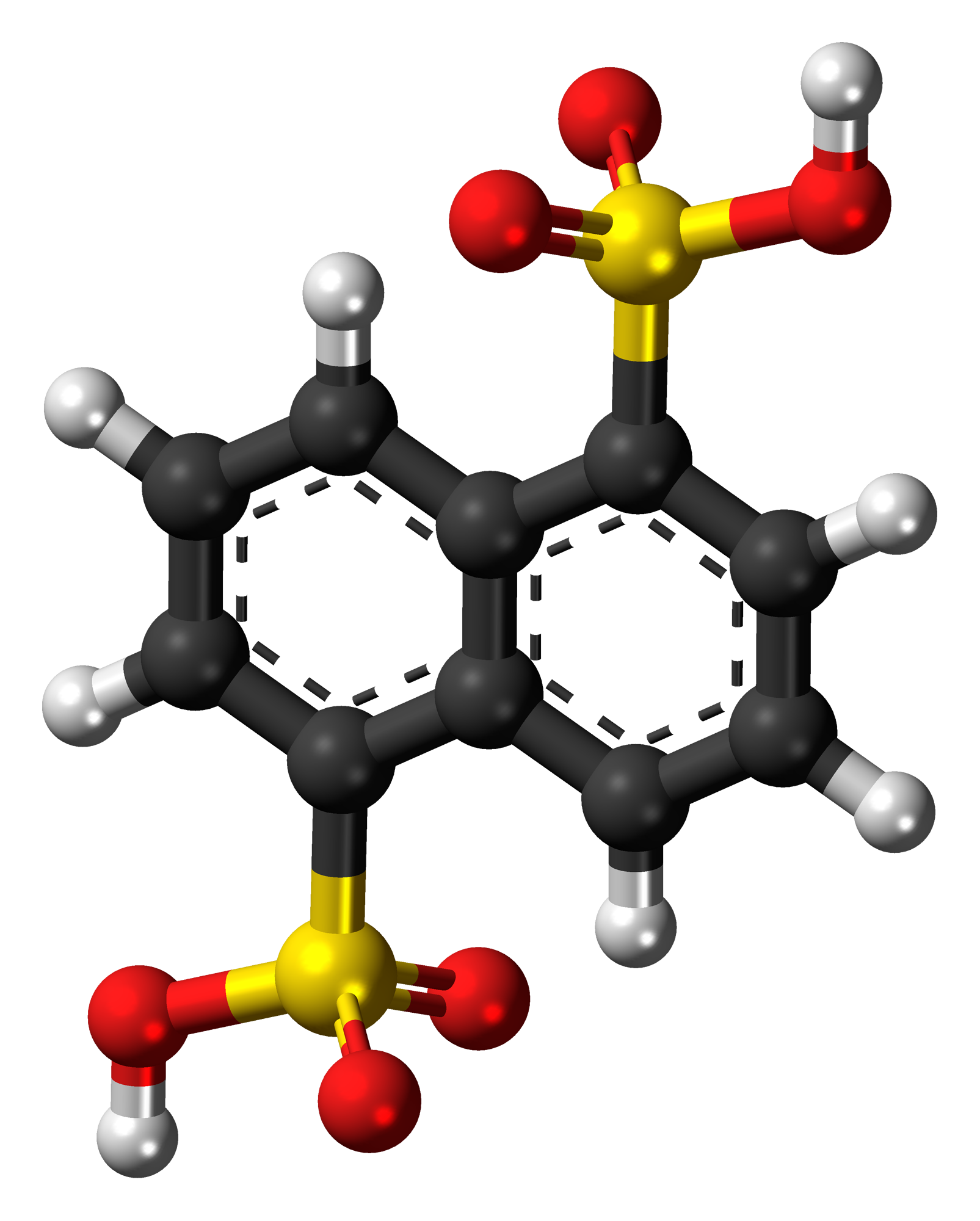

Names
- Preferred IUPAC name Naphthalene-1,5-disulfonic acid
- Other names Armstrong's acid

Identifiers
CAS Number	81-04-9
3D model (JSmol)	Interactive image; Interactive image
ChEBI	CHEBI:30890
ChemSpider	6414
ECHA InfoCard	100.001.199
PubChem CID	6666
UNII	E8FPK78470
CompTox Dashboard (EPA)	DTXSID5046982
- InChI: InChI=1S/C10H8O6S2/c11-17(12,13)9-5-1-3-7-8(9)4-2-6-10(7)18(14,15)16/h1-6H,(H,11,12,13)(H,14,15,16) Key: XTEGVFVZDVNBPF-UHFFFAOYSA-N; InChI=1/C10H8O6S2/c11-17(12,13)9-5-1-3-7-8(9)4-2-6-10(7)18(14,15)16/h1-6H,(H,11,12,13)(H,14,15,16) Key: XTEGVFVZDVNBPF-UHFFFAOYAR
- SMILES: O=S(C2=CC=CC1=C(S(=O)(O)=O)C=CC=C12)(O)=O; O=S(=O)(O)c1cccc2c1cccc2S(=O)(=O)O

Properties
Chemical formula	C_{10}H_{8}S_{2}O_{6}
Molar mass	288.299 g/mol
Appearance	colorless solid

Hazards
- Occupational safety and health (OHS/OSH)
Main hazards	corrosive
- Except where otherwise noted, data are given for materials in their standard state (at 25 °C [77 °F], 100 kPa). verify (what is ?) Infobox references

Armstrong acid (naphthalene-1,5-disulfonic acid) is a fluorescent organic compound with the formula C_{10}H_{6}(SO_{3}H)_{2}. It is one of several isomers of naphthalenedisulfonic acid. It a colorless solid, typically obtained as the tetrahydrate. Like other sulfonic acids, it is a strong acid. It is named for British chemist Henry Edward Armstrong.

== Production and use ==
It is prepared by disulfonation of naphthalene with oleum:

C_{10}H_{8} + 2 SO_{3} → C_{10}H_{6}(SO_{3}H)_{2}

Further sulfonation gives The 1,3,5-trisulfonic acid derivative.

== Reactions and uses ==
Fusion of Armstrong acid in NaOH gives the disodium salt of 1,5-dihydroxynaphthalene, which can be acidified to give the diol. The intermediate in this hydrolysis, 1-hydroxynaphthalene-5-sulfonic acid, is also useful. Nitration gives nitrodisulfonic acids, which are precursors to amino derivatives.

The disodium salt is sometimes used as a divalent counterion for forming salts of basic drug compounds, as an alternative to the related mesylate or tosylate salts. When used in this way such a salt is called a naphthalenedisulfonate salt, as seen with the most common salt form of the stimulant drug CFT. The disodium salt is also used as an electrolyte in certain kinds of chromatography.
