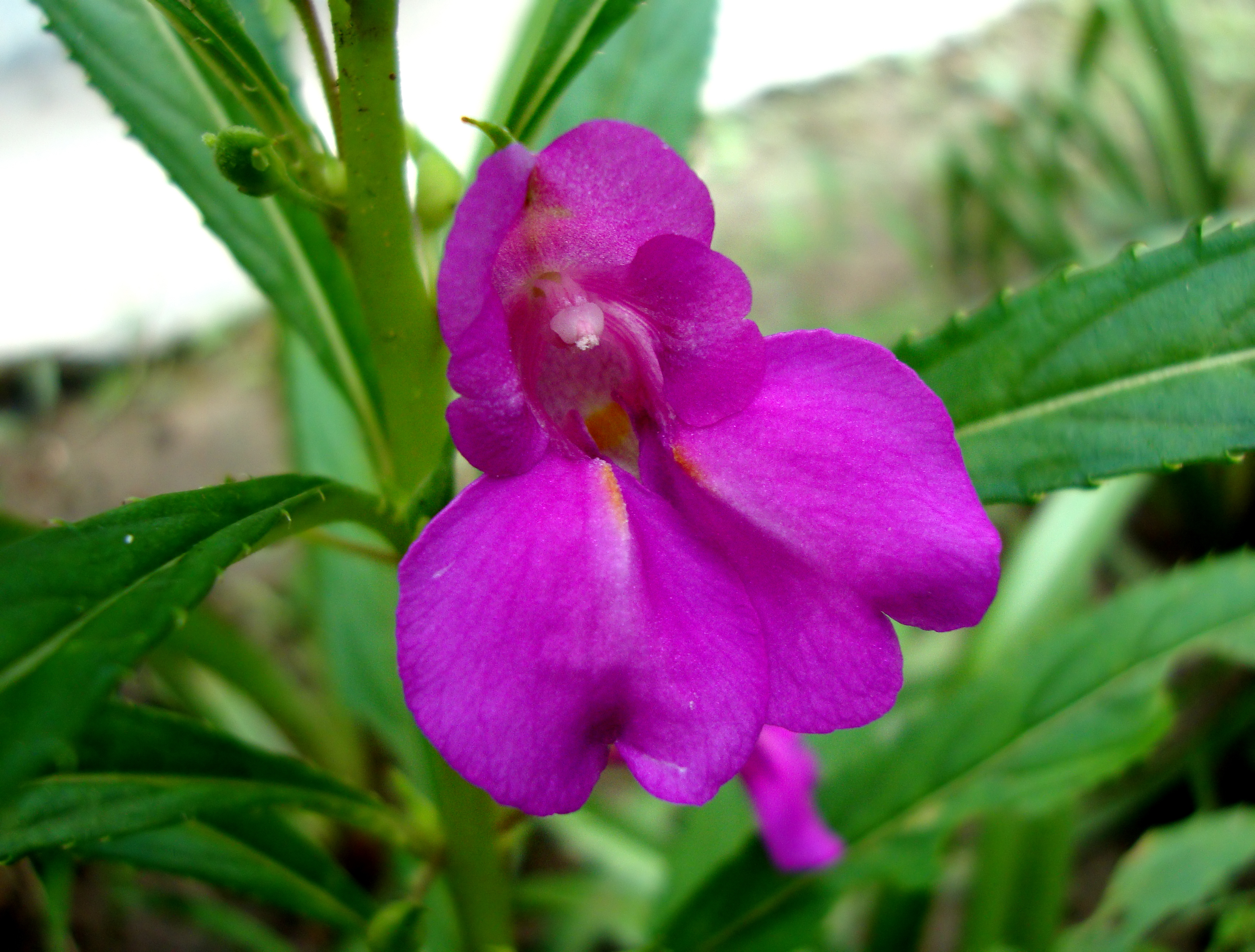

Scientific classification
- Kingdom: Plantae
- Clade: Tracheophytes
- Clade: Angiosperms
- Clade: Eudicots
- Clade: Asterids
- Order: Ericales
- Family: Balsaminaceae
- Genus: Impatiens
- Species: I. balsamina

Binomial name
- Impatiens balsamina L.

= Impatiens balsamina =

Species of flowering plant

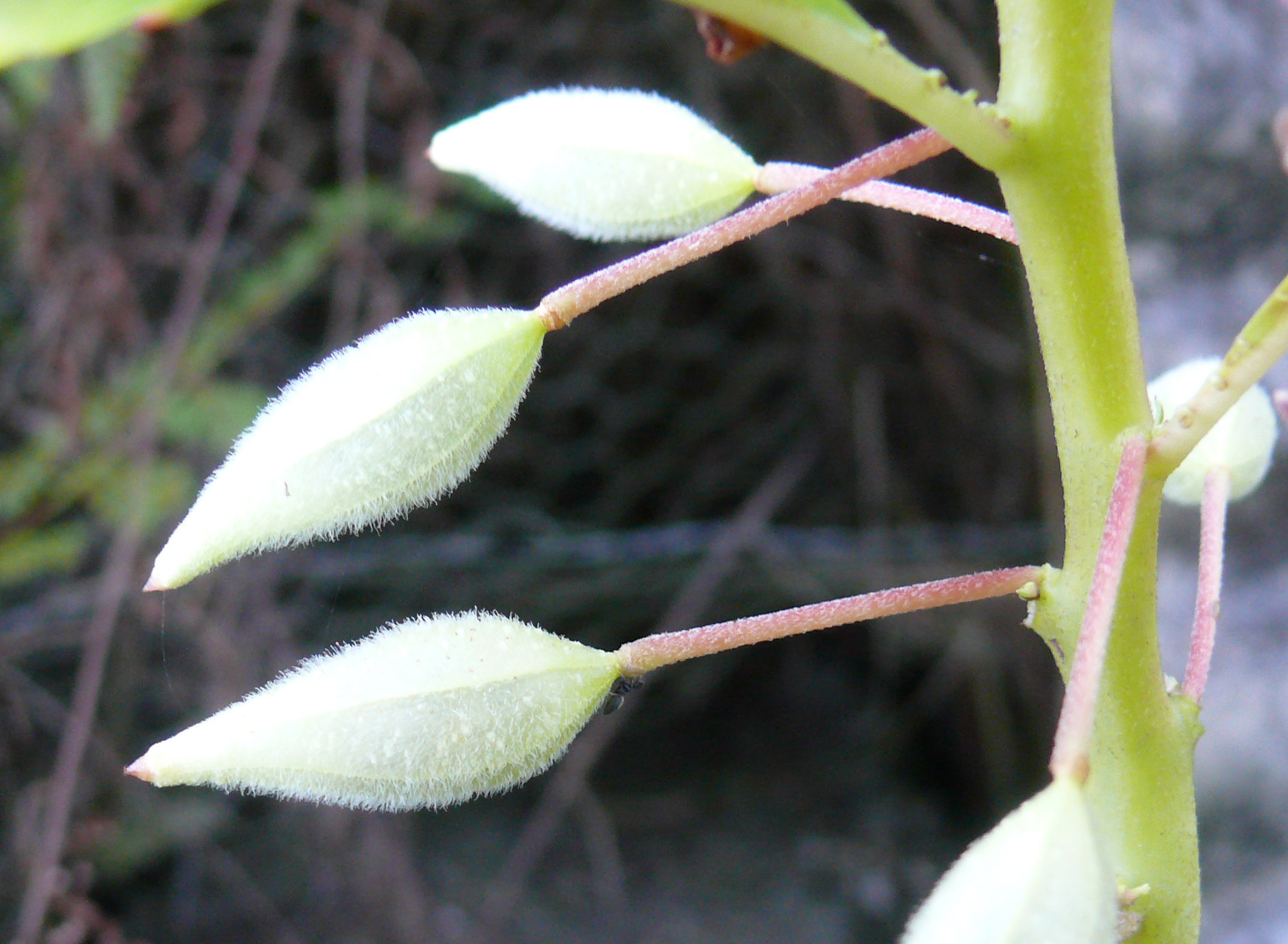
Fruits

Impatiens balsamina, commonly known as balsam, garden balsam, rose balsam, touch-me-not or spotted snapweed, is a species of plant native to India and Myanmar.

It is an annual plant growing to 20–75 cm (7.9–29.5 in) tall, with a thick, but soft stem. The leaves are spirally-arranged, 2.5–9 cm (1.0–3.5 in) long and 1–2.5 cm broad, with a deeply toothed margin. The flowers are pink, red, mauve, purple, lilac, or white, and 2.5–5 cm diameter; they are pollinated by bees and other insects, and also by nectar-feeding birds. The ripe seed capsules undergo explosive dehiscence.

== Human use ==
Different parts of the plant are used as traditional remedies for disease and skin afflictions. Juice from the leaves is used to treat warts and snakebite, and the flower is applied to burns. This species has been used as indigenous traditional medicine in Asia for rheumatism, fractures, and other ailments. In Korean folk medicine, this impatiens species is used as a medicine called bongseonhwa dae (봉선화대) for the treatment of constipation and gastritis. Chinese people used the plant to treat those bitten by snakes or who ingested poisonous fish. Juice from the stalk, pulverised dried stalks, and pastes from the flowers were also used to treat a variety of ailments. Vietnamese wash their hair with an extract of the plant to stimulate hair growth. One in vitro study found extracts of this impatiens species, especially of the seed pod, to be active against antibiotic-resistant strains of Helicobacter pylori. It is also an inhibitor of 5α-reductases, enzymes that converts testosterone to dihydrotestosterone (active form of testosterone), thus reducing action of testosterone in our body.

In Nepal, the balsam leaves are crushed to dye fingernails on the day of Shrawan Sakranti (Shrawan 1). The day is also observed as Luto Faalne Deen (Go Away-Itch Day). Similarly, in China and Korea, the flowers are crushed and mixed with alum to produce an orange dye that can be used to dye fingernails. Unlike common nail varnish, the dye is semi-permanent, requiring dyed nails to grow off over time in order to remove any traces of color.

== Chemistry ==
The naphthoquinones lawsone, or hennotannic acid, and lawsone methyl ether and methylene-3,3'-bilawsone are some of the active compounds in I. balsamina leaves. It also contains kaempferol and several derivatives. Baccharane glycosides have been found in Chinese herbal remedies made from the seeds.

== Ecology ==
It is widely cultivated as an ornamental plant, and has become naturalised and invasive on several Pacific Ocean islands.

== In popular culture ==
Balsam flowers are referenced in the Okinawan folk song Tinsagu Nu Hana, where the way children use them to color their nails is compared to how parents color (teach and guide) the minds of their children.

The Japanese vocaloid song Housenka (鳳仙花, which translates to Impatiens balsamina) describes a person who doesn't fit in with a social group despite wanting to. In the music video, the singer laments this fate and compares herself to the plant. She references its "touch-me-not" nickname and the Hedgehog's Dilemma-esque explosive dehiscence of its seeds by saying:

"Don't touch me," the balsam [says], fallen silent. And yet it can't leave seeds unless it breaks from its shell.

Hong Nan-pa's 1919 "Bongseonhwa", called Korea's first Western-style song, was named for the flower (bongseonhwa [봉선화] in Korean). In it, Hong uses the analogy of a spent I. balsamina in autumn for Korea under Japanese colonial rule, with the hope for rebirth in the spring. Several South Korean films and dramas, including the 1956 movie A Touch-Me-Not (Bongseonhwa), are also named for the flower.

== Gallery ==
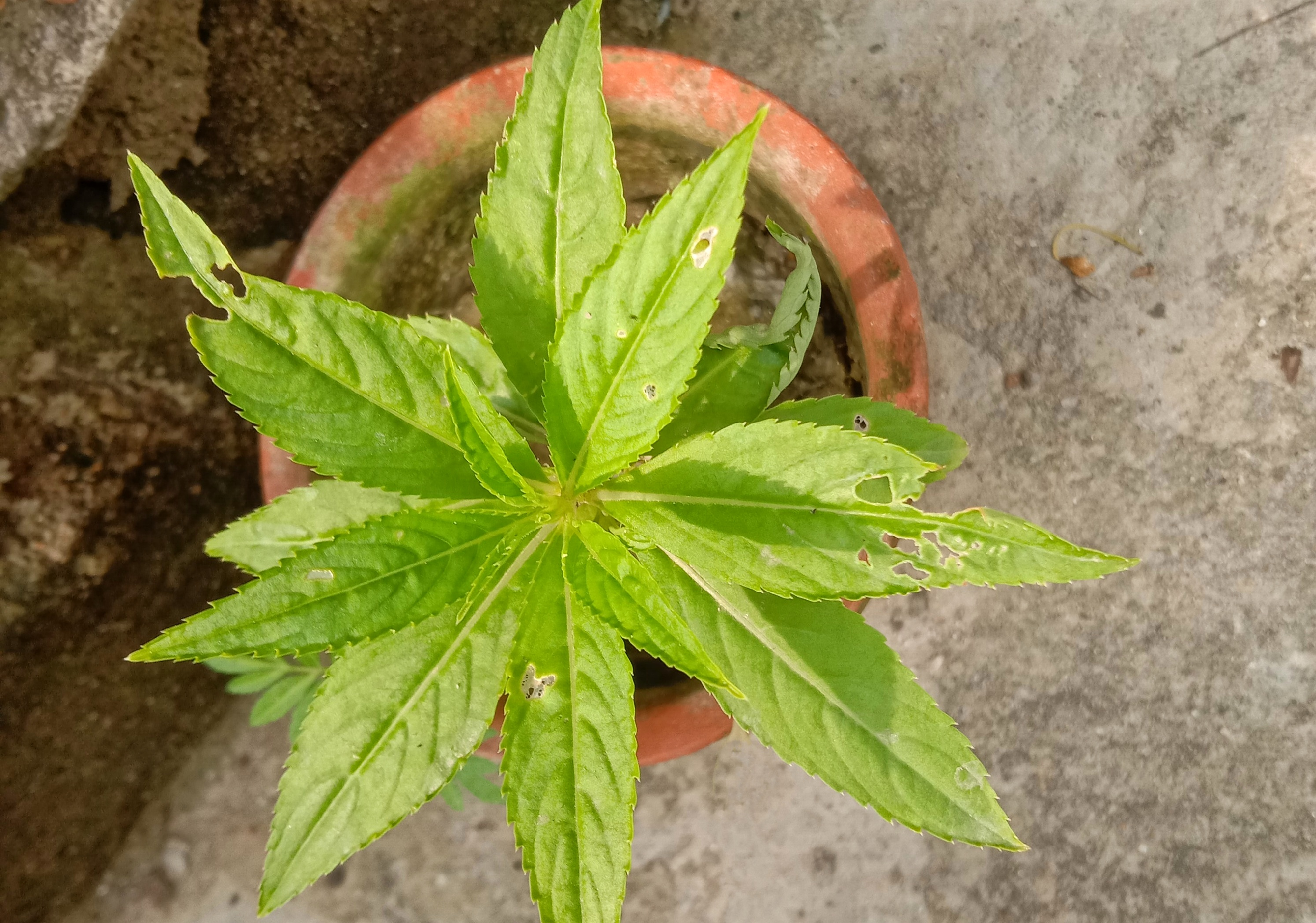
Balsam plant in West Bengal, India

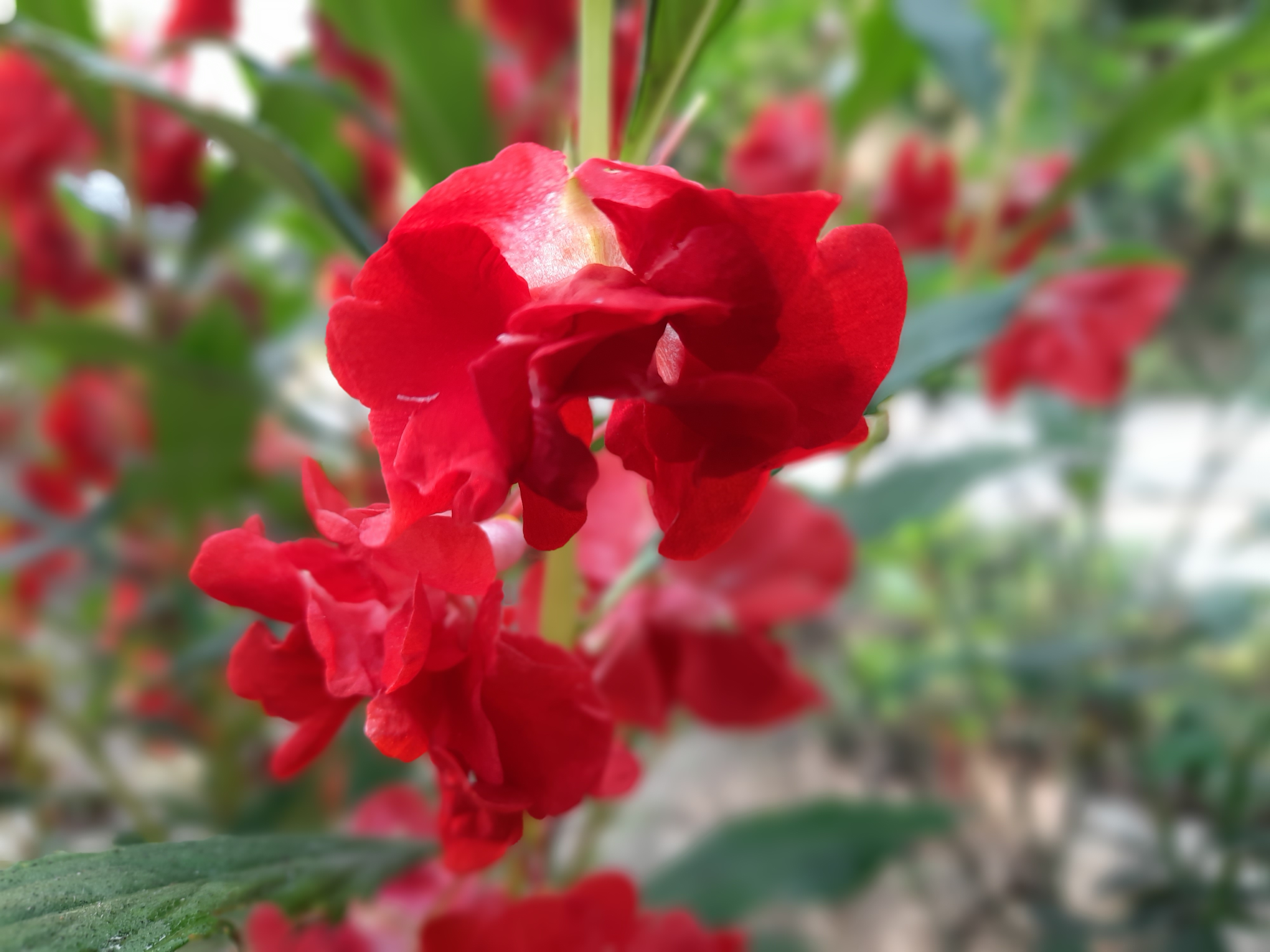
Impatiens balsamina grown in Bangladesh

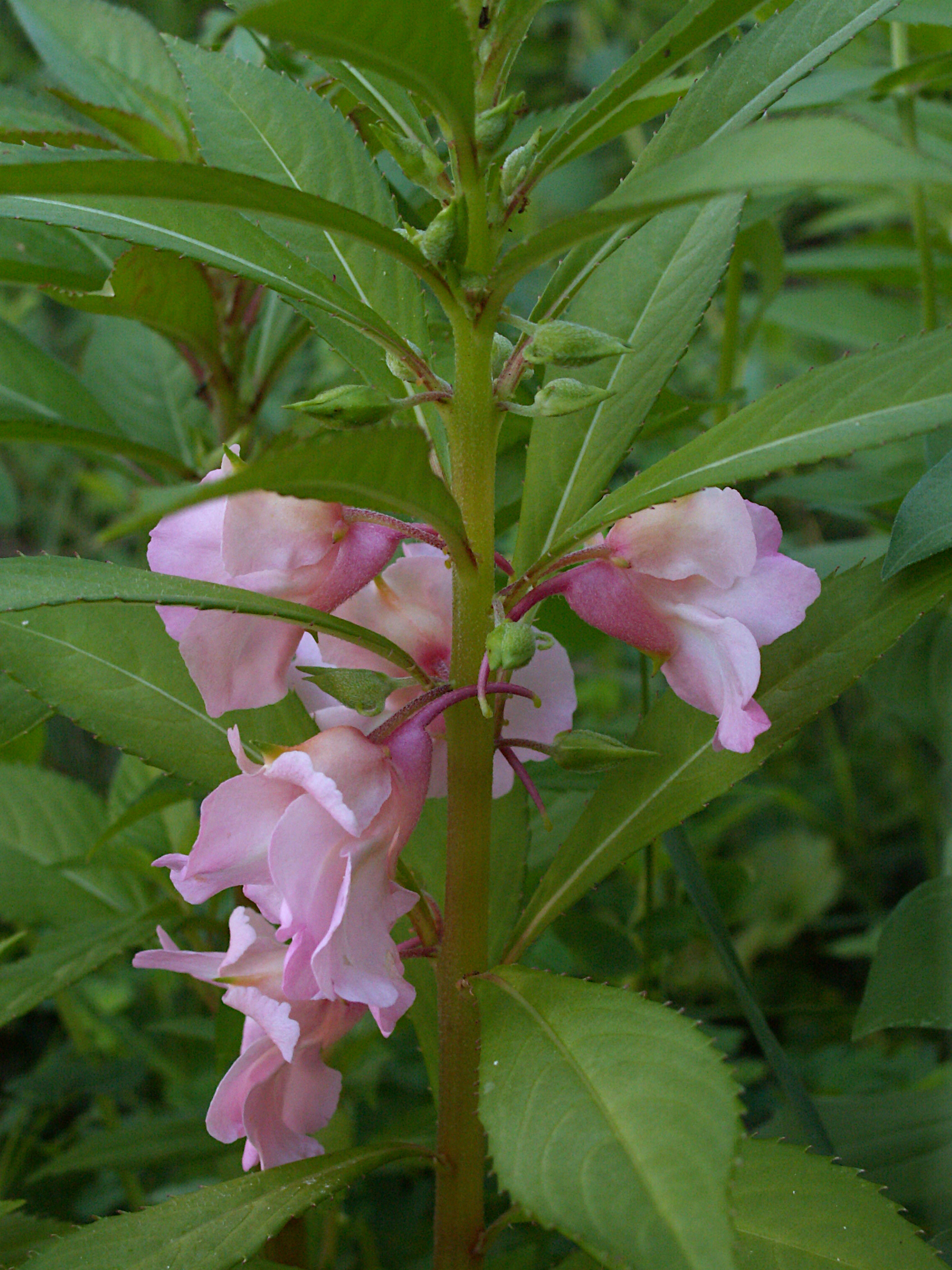
Balsam (Impatiens balsamina) blooming in a garden in the Beechview neighborhood of Pittsburgh

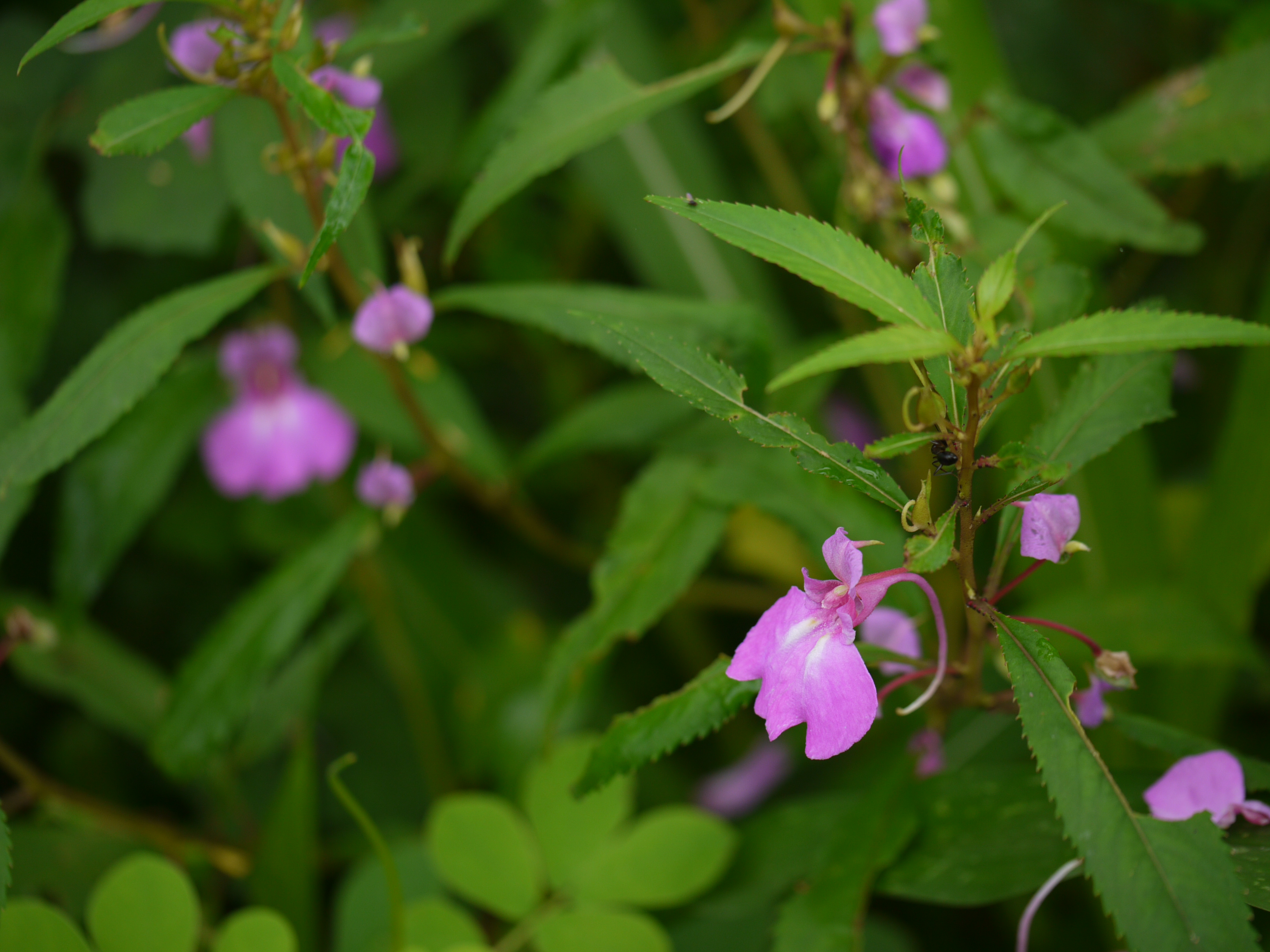
Impatiens balsamina

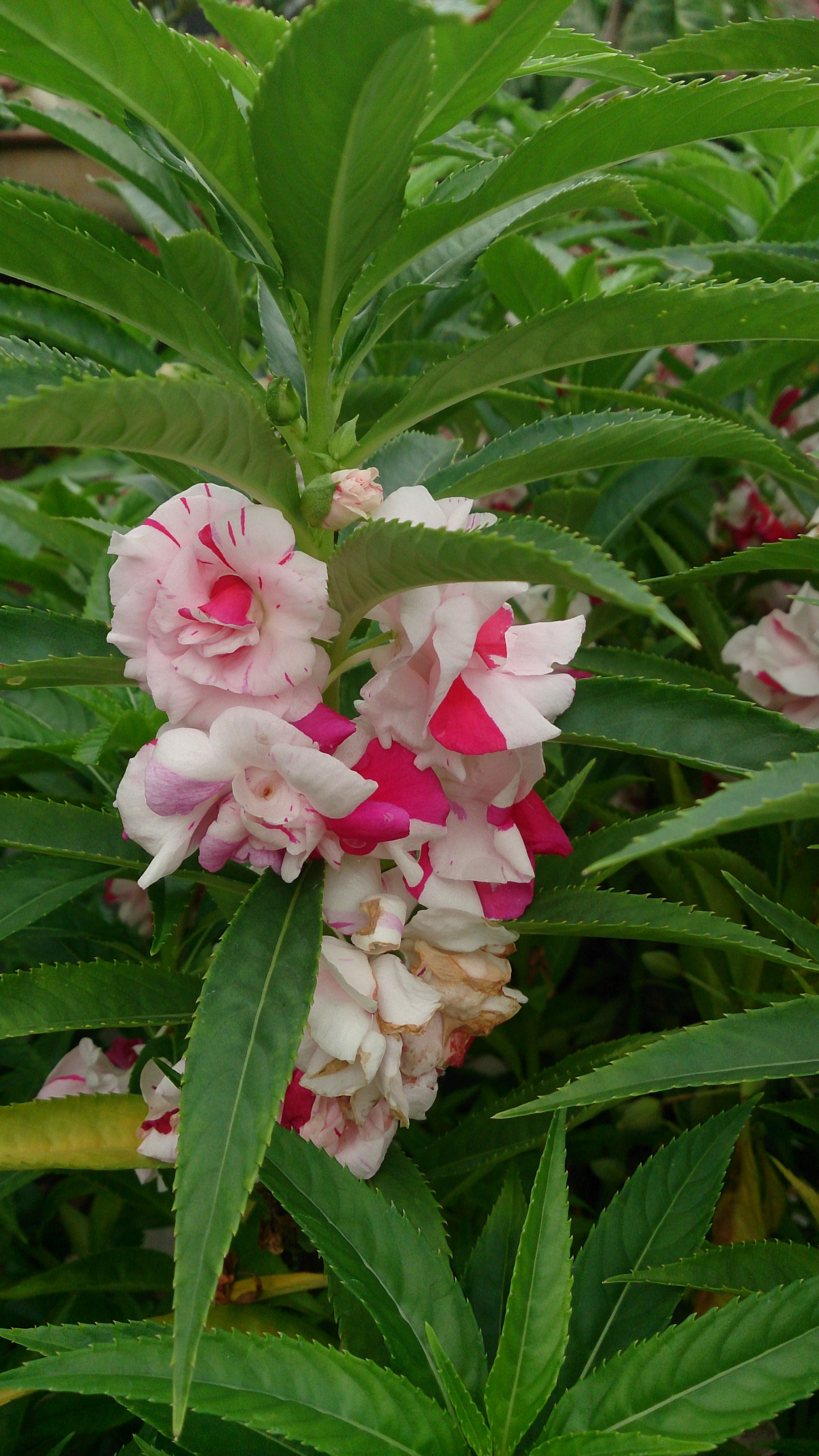
Balsam

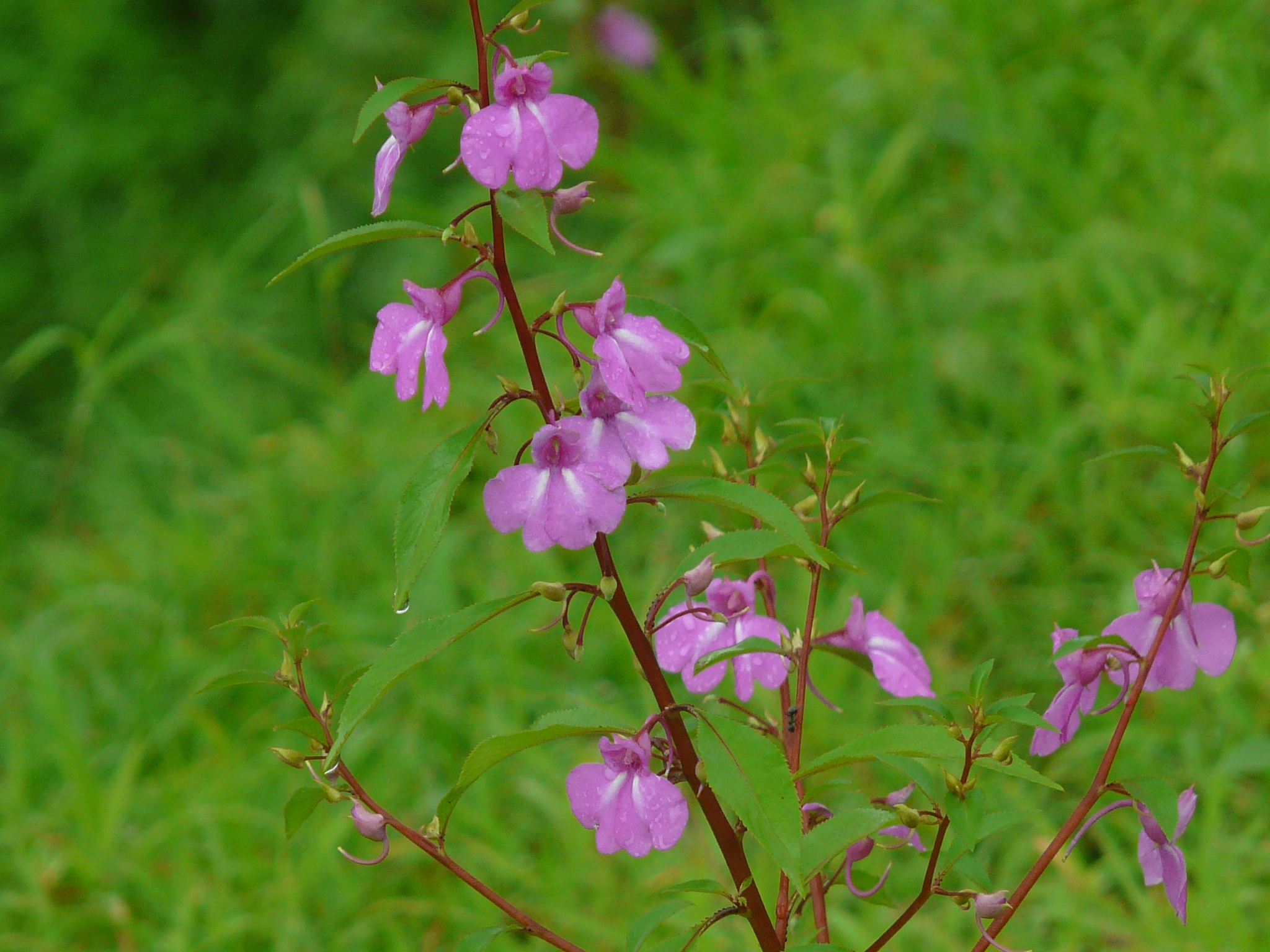
Impatiens balsamina

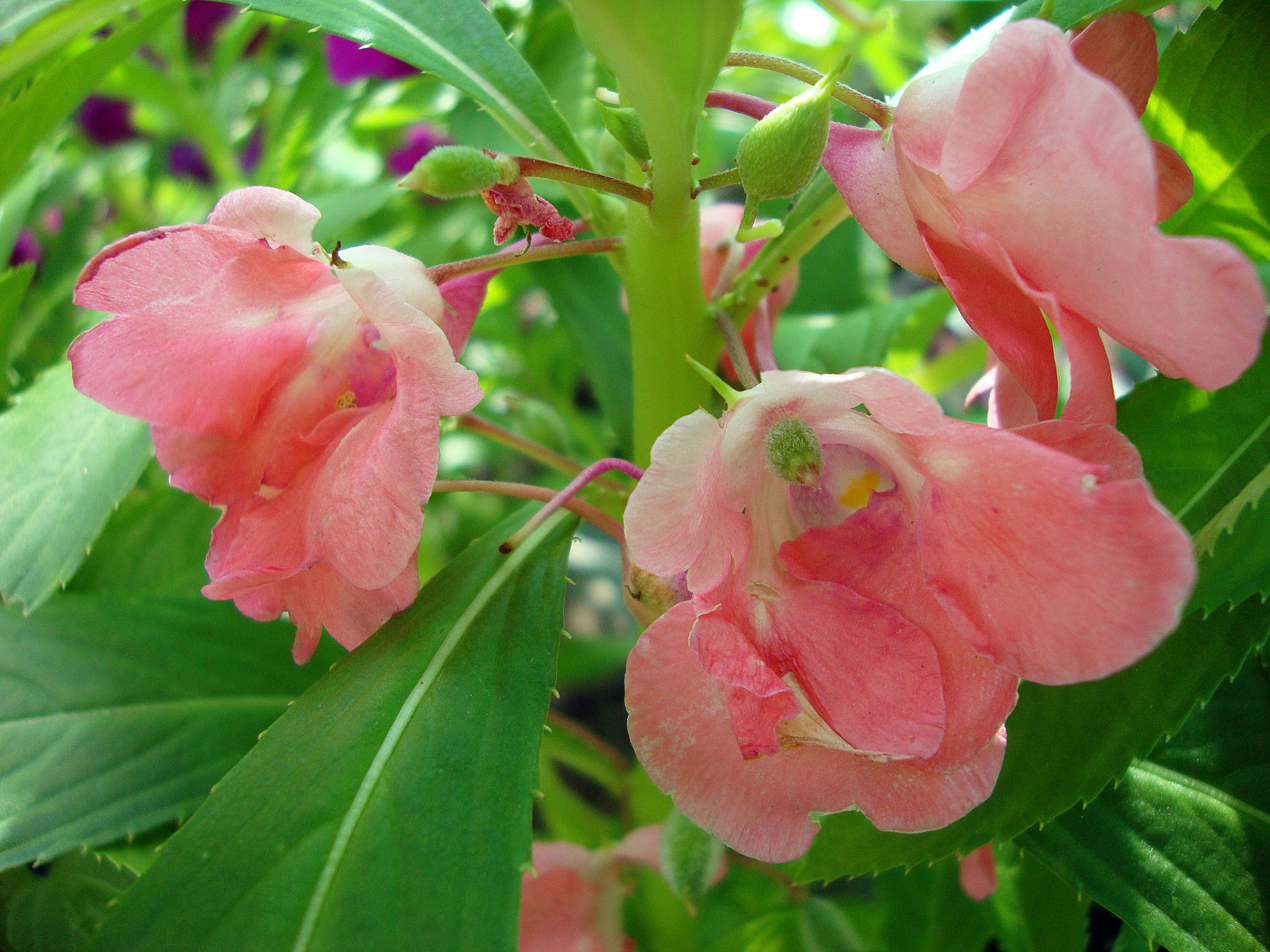
Phoenix, nail tree

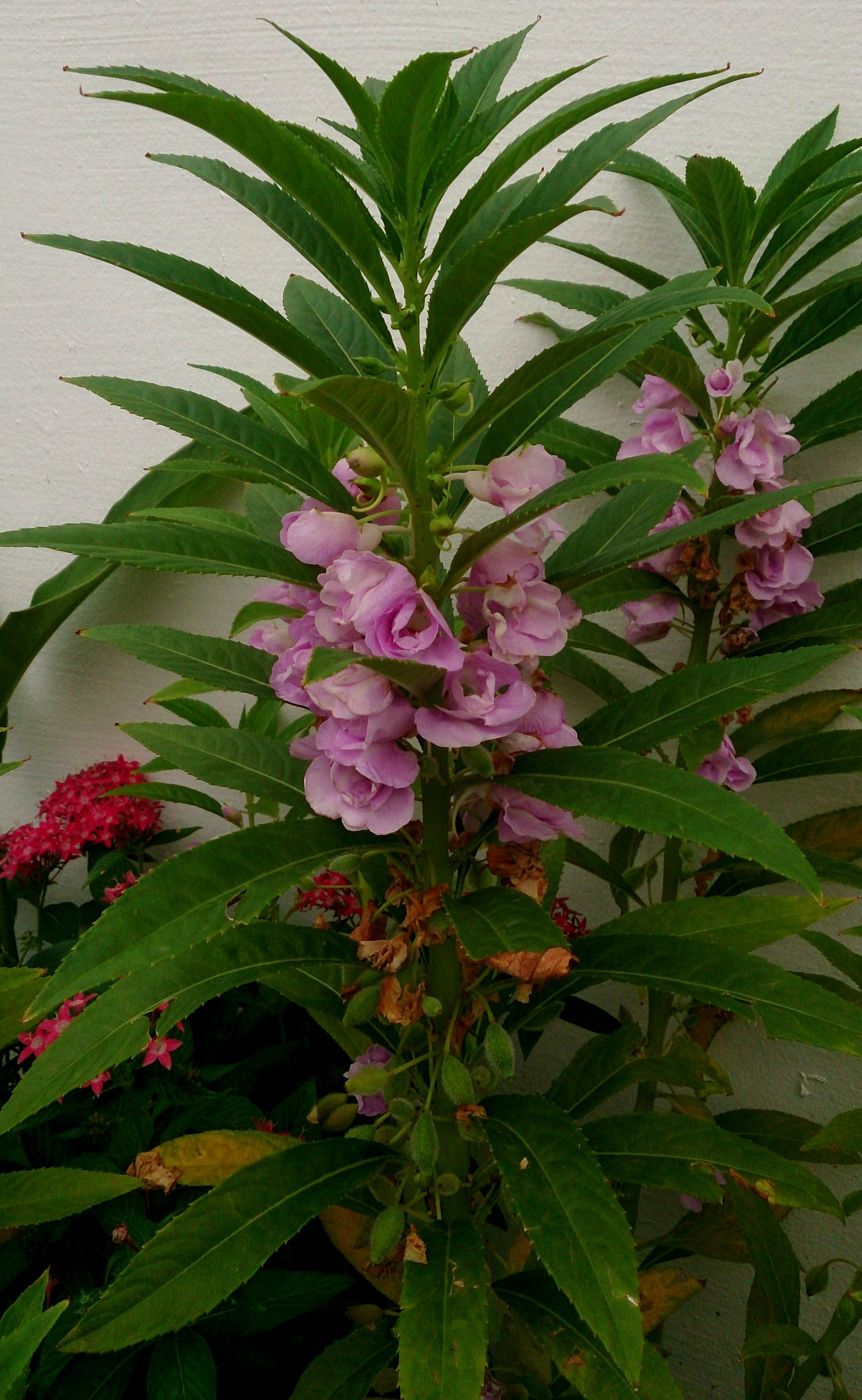
Impatiens balsamina

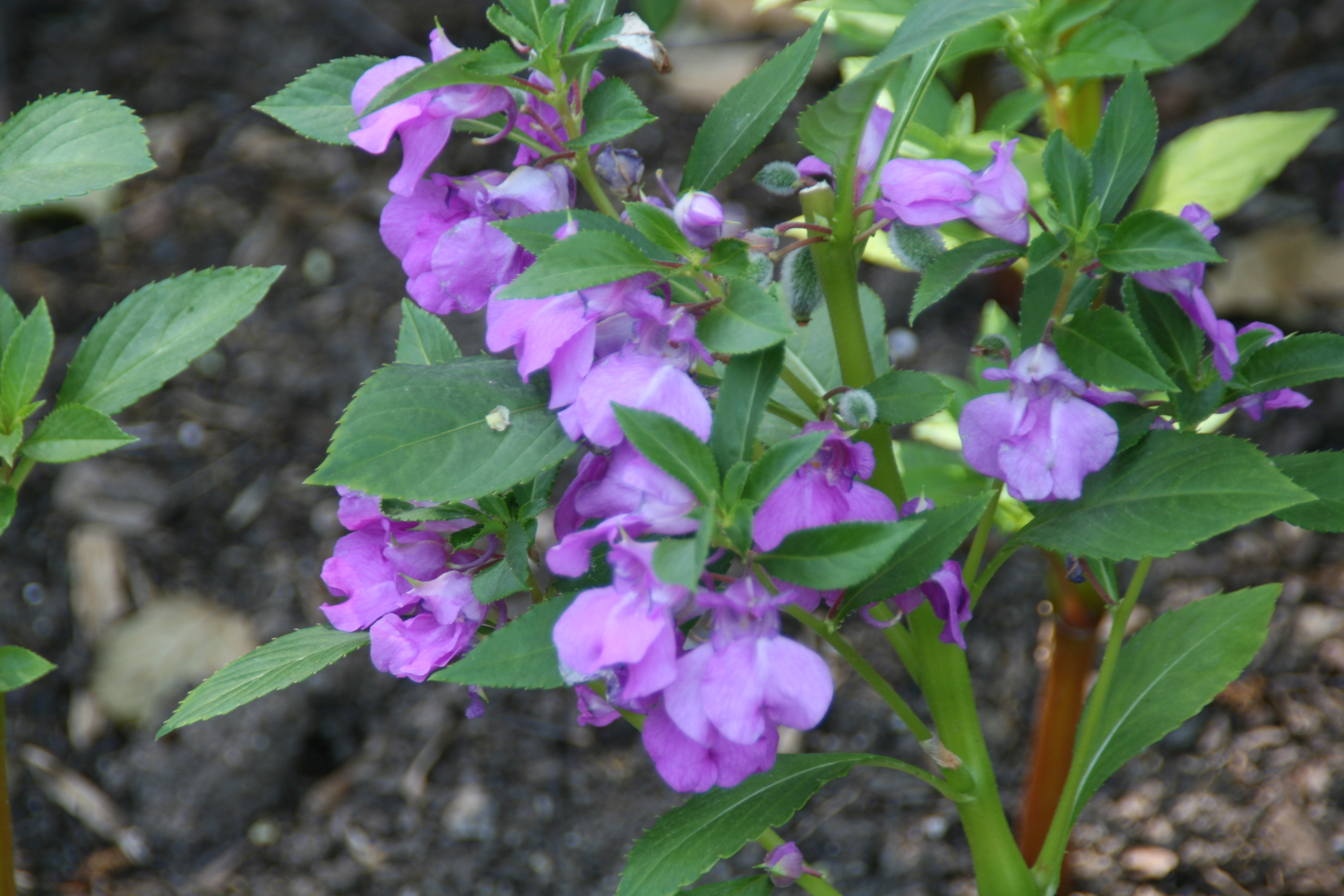
Location taken: Brookside Gardens, Maryland

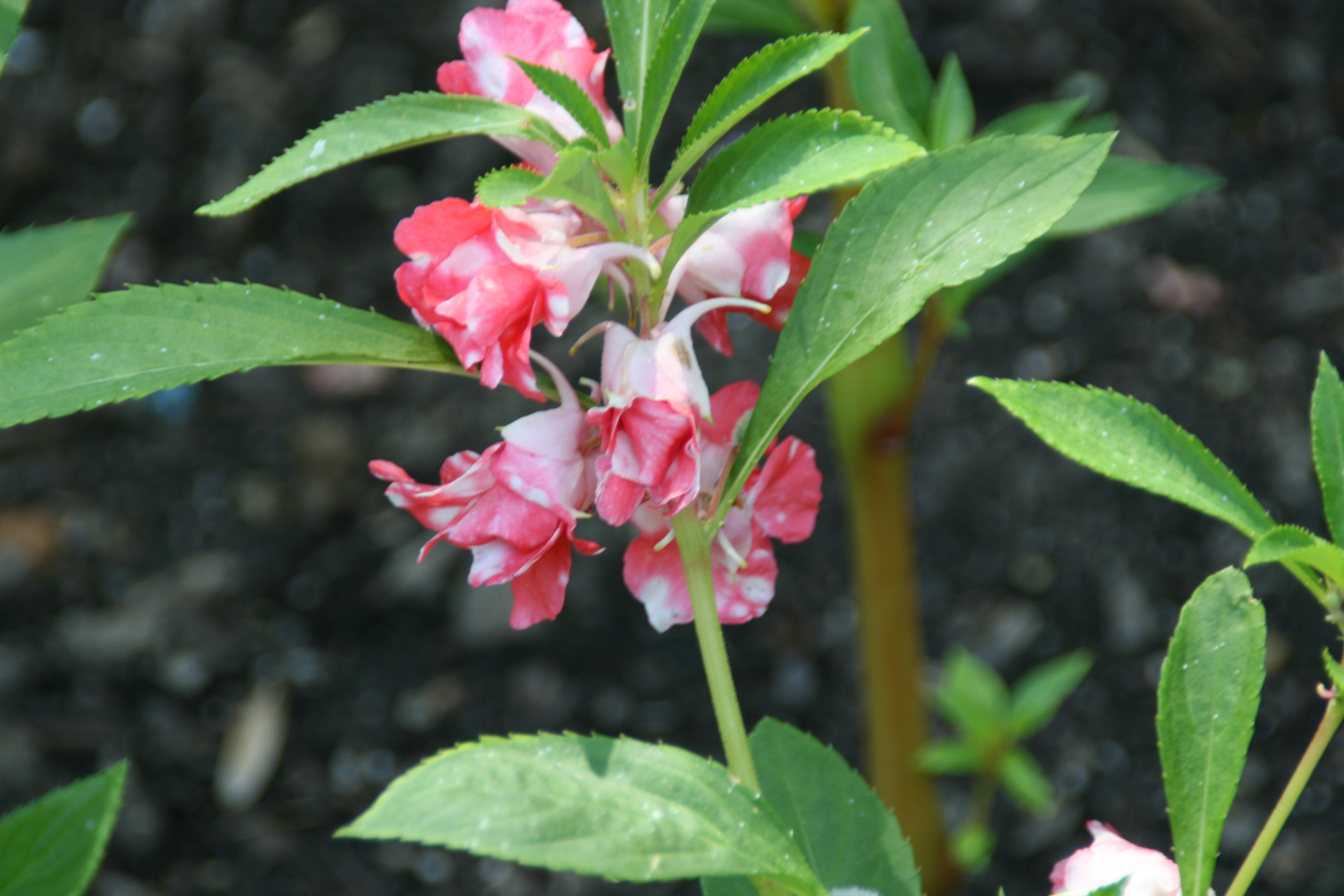
Location taken: Brookside Gardens, Maryland

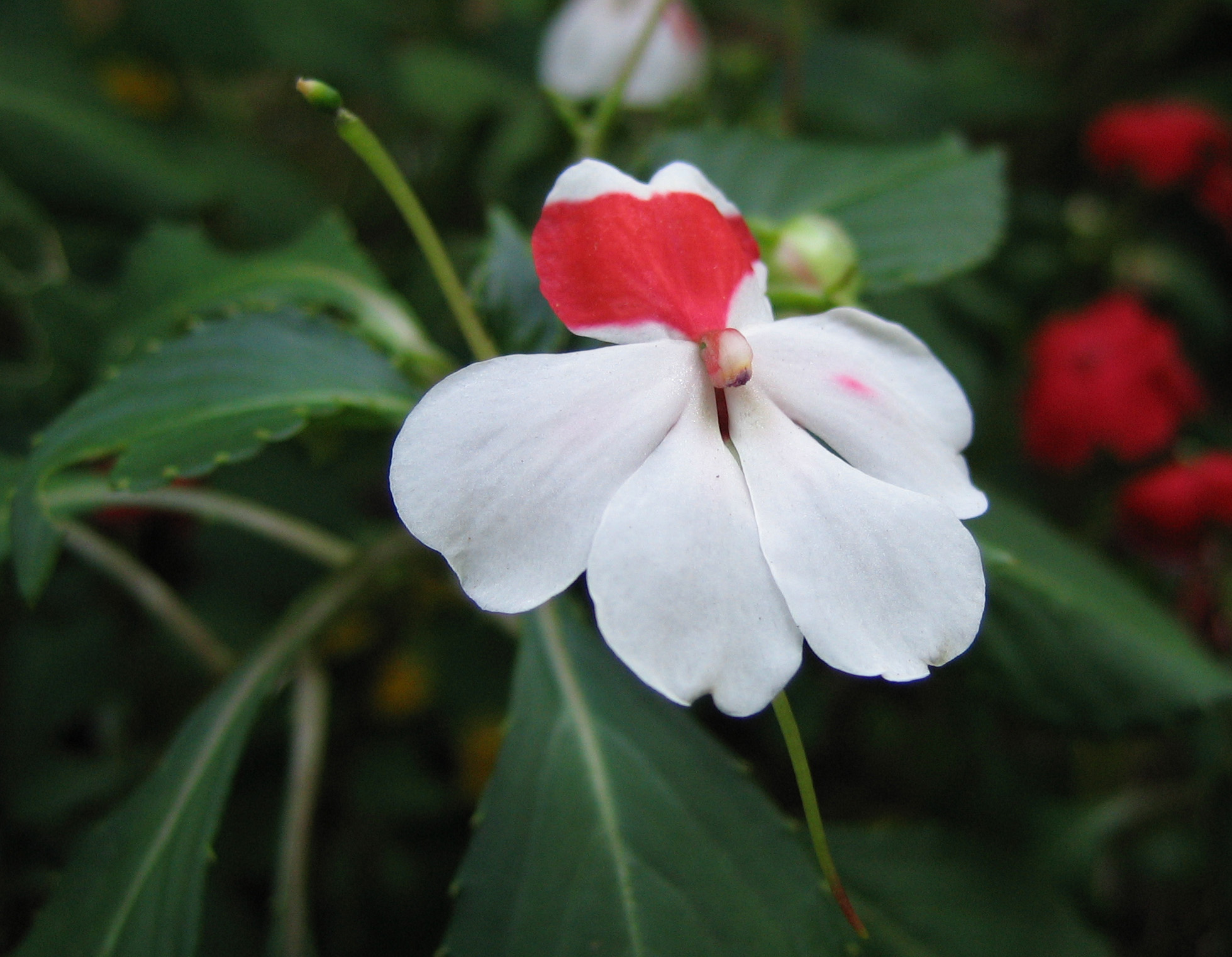
Impatiens balsamina

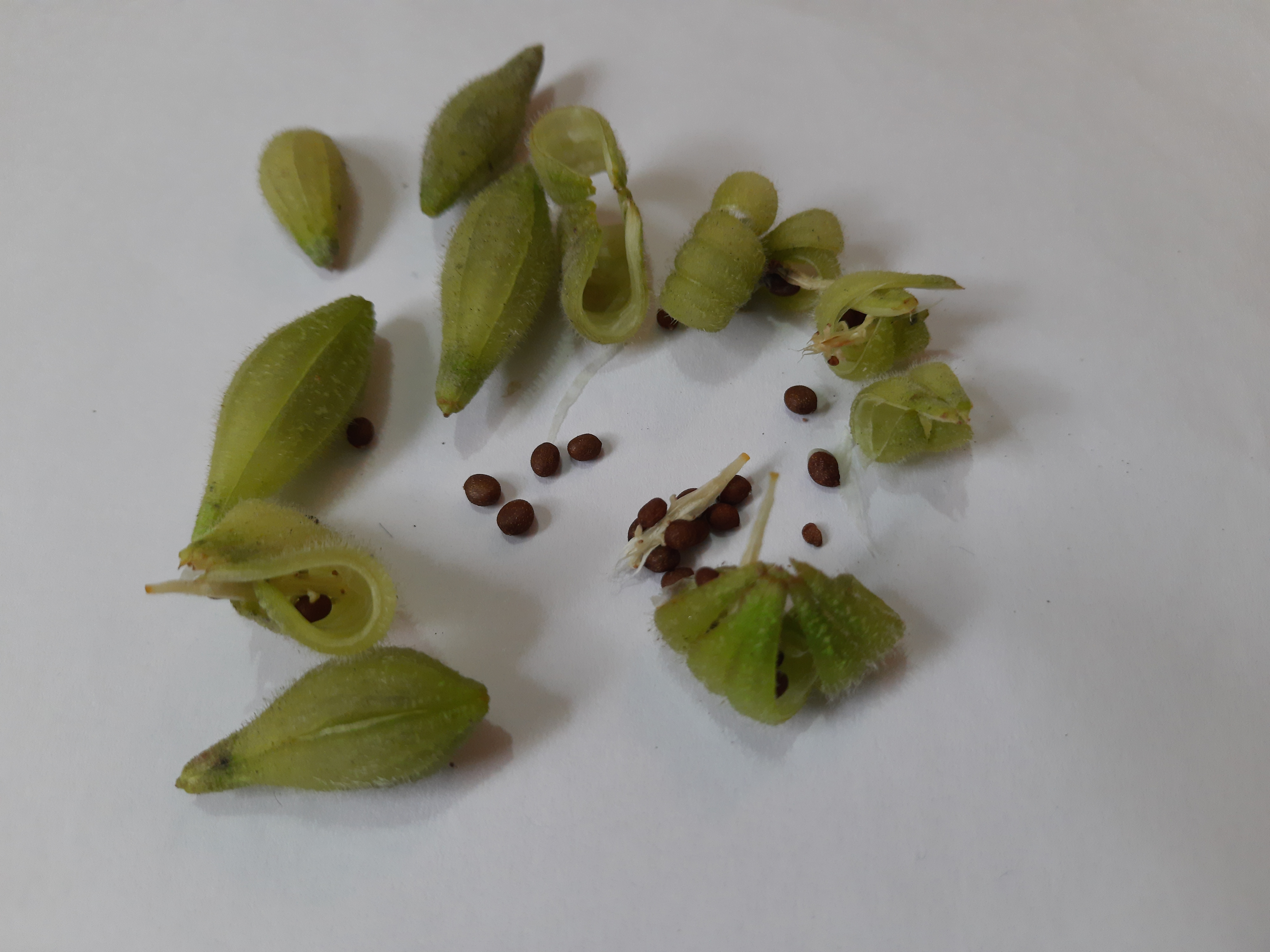
Seeds

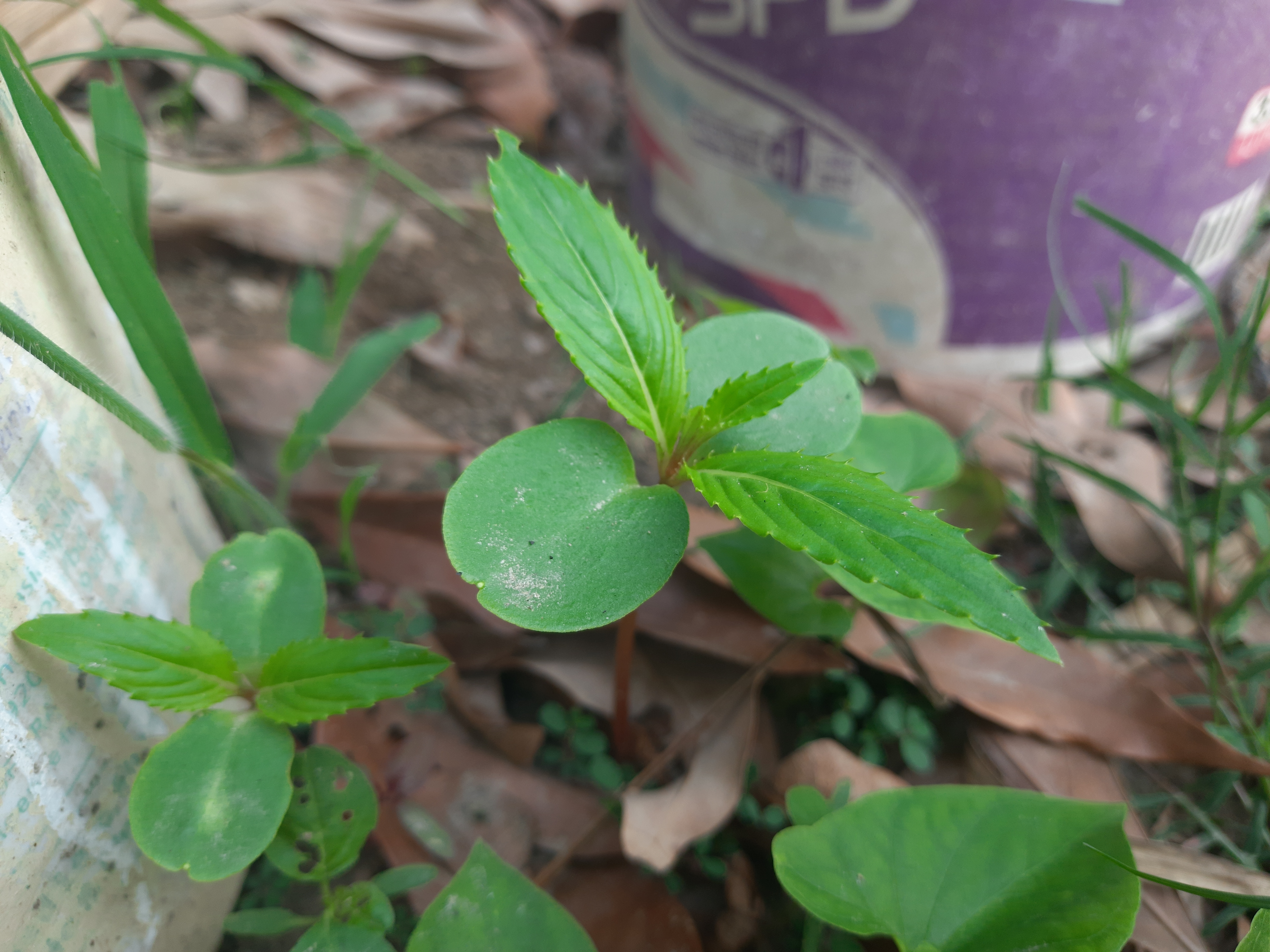
Saplings of Impatiens balsamina. The cotyledons are visible.

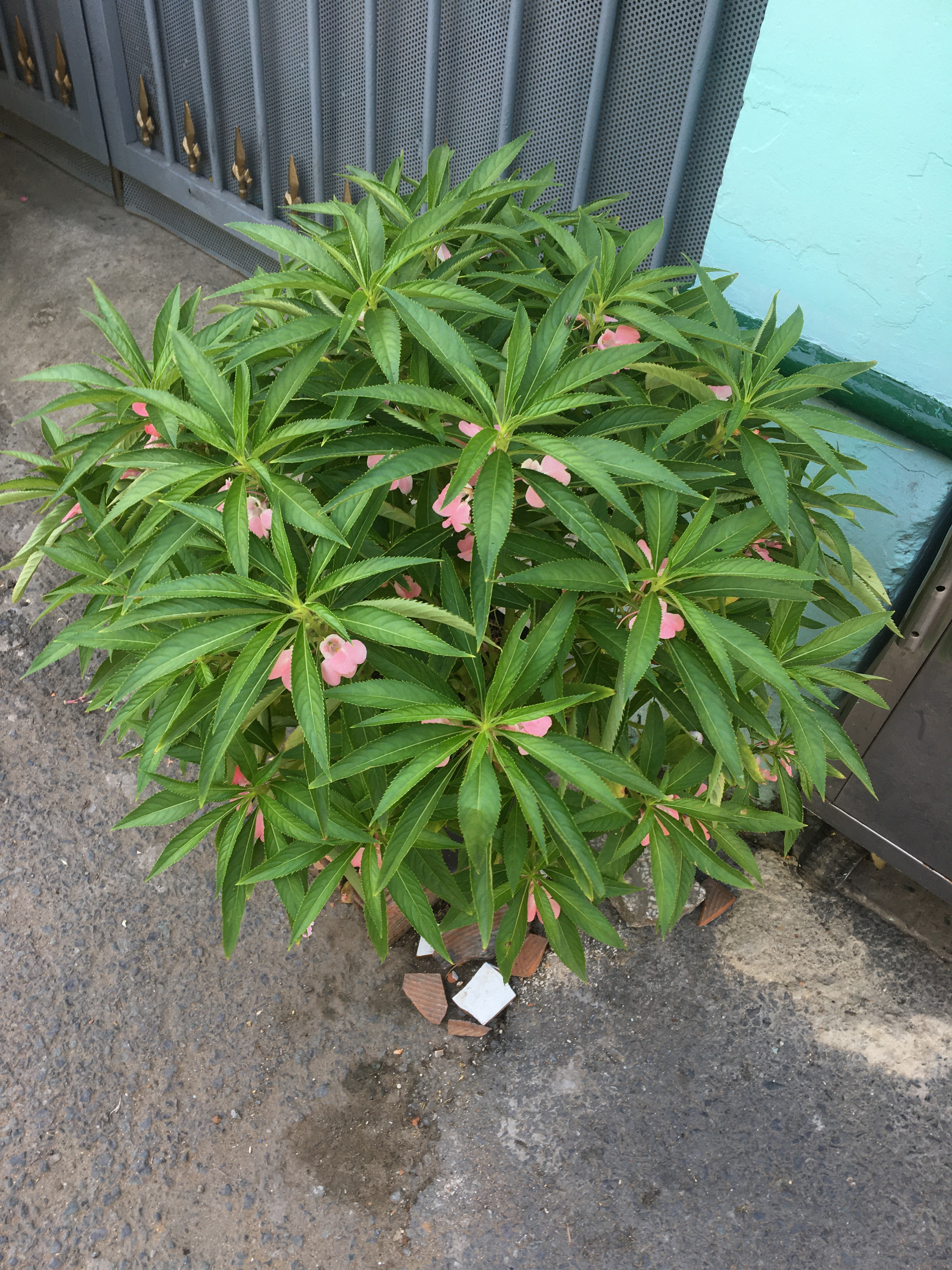
