= Root barrier =

Underground wall placed to block plant roots

A root barrier is an underground wall placed to block plant roots. This is often for the purpose of protecting structures or other plants, but root barriers are also used to preserve soil moisture.

== Development ==
Root barriers were developed to stop trees damaging buildings. Concrete was historically a common material but since 1992 plastic root barriers have become more common due to their resistance to cracking caused by soil and moisture movement.

== Placement ==
Root barriers intended to protect structures normally run parallel to the structure at a distance. They typically extend down to a naturally occurring soil layer which is not penetrable by roots, to prevent the roots growing under the barrier. To avoid endangering trees, root barriers must be placed some distance away from the tree and avoid surrounding it completely.

== Applications ==
Root barriers can be used to protect infrastructure from damage by tree roots below. They are also moisture-proof, which can be useful to preserve buildings on clay soils by preventing moisture escaping laterally. After installation the soil under the building can be rehydrated if necessary.

Root barriers are also used to separate plant roots from each other. In particular, walnut trees secrete the chemical juglone which is toxic to other plants but the use of root barriers can prevent the yield reduction that would normally occur when walnut trees are alley cropped with maize as often occurs in the American Midwest.
