= 2,6-Dihydroxynaphthalene =

Identifiers
CAS Number	581-43-1
3D model (JSmol)	Interactive image
ChEBI	CHEBI:197110
ChEMBL	ChEMBL205074
ChemSpider	84452
ECHA InfoCard	100.008.606
EC Number	209-465-6
PubChem CID	93552
UNII	4XX2ND0257
CompTox Dashboard (EPA)	DTXSID7060384
- InChI: InChI=1S/C10H8O2/c11-9-3-1-7-5-10(12)4-2-8(7)6-9/h1-6,11-12H Key: MNZMMCVIXORAQL-UHFFFAOYSA-N
- SMILES: C1=CC2=C(C=CC(=C2)O)C=C1O

Properties
Chemical formula	C_{10}H_{8}O_{2}
Molar mass	160.172 g·mol^{−1}
Appearance	white solid
Melting point	220 °C (428 °F; 493 K)

Hazards
- GHS labelling
Pictograms	(GHS07: Exclamation mark)
Signal word	Warning
Hazard statements	H315, H319, H335
Precautionary statements	P261, P264, P264+P265, P271, P280, P302+P352, P304+P340, P305+P351+P338, P319, P321, P332+P317, P337+P317, P362+P364, P403+P233, P405, P501
- Except where otherwise noted, data are given for materials in their standard state (at 25 °C [77 °F], 100 kPa). Infobox references

2,6-Dihydroxynaphthalene is an organic compound with the formula C_{10}H_{6}(OH)_{2}. It is one of several isomers of dihydroxynaphthalene. A white solid, degraded samples often appear grey to light brown solid.

== Preparation and reactions ==
2,6-Dihydroxynaphthalene is prepared by base hydrolysis of 2-hydroxynaphthalene-6-sulfonic acid. It can be oxidized to 2,6-naphthoquinone using lead dioxide.
