= Acid orange 19 =

Names
- Other names Sodium 4-hydroxy-3-(2-(4-methyl-3-((phenylamino)sulfonyl)phenyl)diazenyl)-1-naphthalenesulfonate

Identifiers
CAS Number	3058-98-8
3D model (JSmol)	Interactive image
ChemSpider	4675590
ECHA InfoCard	100.019.363
EC Number	221-298-0
PubChem CID	135601373
CompTox Dashboard (EPA)	DTXSID90883728
- InChI: InChI=1S/C23H19N3O6S2.Na/c1-15-11-12-17(13-21(15)33(28,29)26-16-7-3-2-4-8-16)24-25-20-14-22(34(30,31)32)18-9-5-6-10-19(18)23(20)27;/h2-14,26-27H,1H3,(H,30,31,32);/q;+1/p-1 Key: KKJOSHGDFRDDGD-UHFFFAOYSA-M
- SMILES: CC1=C(C=C(C=C1)N=NC2=C(C3=CC=CC=C3C(=C2)S(=O)(=O)[O-])O)S(=O)(=O)NC4=CC=CC=C4.[Na+]

Properties
Chemical formula	C_{23}H_{18}N_{3}NaO_{6}S_{2}
Molar mass	519.52 g·mol^{−1}

Hazards
- GHS labelling
Hazard statements	H412
Precautionary statements	P273, P501
- Except where otherwise noted, data are given for materials in their standard state (at 25 °C [77 °F], 100 kPa). Infobox references

Acid orange 19 is an azo dye that is used to color polyamide and wool fibers. It is usually available as a fine reddish-orange powder. The dye is soluble in water, producing an orange solution. When this solution is treated with concentrated hydrochloric acid, it turns red.

Acid orange 19 is prepared by azo coupling with 1-Hydroxynaphthalene-4-sulfonic acid.

Like most azo dyes, it is mildly toxic when orally ingested and has carcinogenic properties.
