= 1,4-Dihydroxynaphthalene =

Names
- Other names: 1,4-Naphthoquinol; 1,4-naphthalenediol

Identifiers
| CAS Number | 571-60-8 |
| 3D model (JSmol) | Interactive image |
| ChEBI | CHEBI:34063 |
| ChEMBL | ChEMBL206816 |
| ChemSpider | 10830 |
| ECHA InfoCard | 100.008.489 |
| EC Number | 209-336-4 |
| KEGG | C14785 |
| PubChem CID | 11305 |
| UNII | AML1P6T42C |
| CompTox Dashboard (EPA) | DTXSID5060350 |
- InChI: InChI=1S/C10H8O2/c11-9-5-6-10(12)8-4-2-1-3-7(8)9/h1-6,11-12H Key: PCILLCXFKWDRMK-UHFFFAOYSA-N
- SMILES: C1=CC=C2C(=C1)C(=CC=C2O)O

Properties
| Chemical formula | C_{10}H_{8}O_{2} |
| Molar mass | 160.172 g·mol^{−1} |
| Appearance | white solid |
| Melting point | 190 °C (374 °F; 463 K) tautomerizes |
| Acidity (pK_{a}) | pK_{a1} = 9.37 (26.5 °C) pK_{a2} = 10.93 (26.5 °C) |

Hazards
- GHS labelling
| Pictograms | (GHS05: Corrosive) (GHS07: Exclamation mark) |
| Signal word | Danger |
| Hazard statements | H302, H315, H318, H335, H412 |
| Precautionary statements | P261, P264, P264+P265, P270, P271, P273, P280, P301+P317, P302+P352, P304+P340, P305+P354+P338, P317, P319, P321, P330, P332+P317, P362+P364, P403+P233, P405, P501 |
- Except where otherwise noted, data are given for materials in their standard state (at 25 °C [77 °F], 100 kPa). Infobox references

1,4-Dihydroxynaphthalene is an organic compound with the formula C_{10}H_{6}(OH)_{2}. It is one of several isomers of dihydroxynaphthalene. The compound attracted some interest because in its molten state, it exists mainly as the diketo tautomer.

tautomerization of 1,4-dihydroxynaphthalene

It can be prepared by reduction of 1,4-naphthoquinone with dithionite as well as by acid-hydrolysis of 1-hydroxy-4-aminonaphthalene. Both routes are reversible: oxidation of the diol give the naphthoquinone and addition of ammonia gives back the hydroxyaminonaphthalene.
