= Plumbagin =

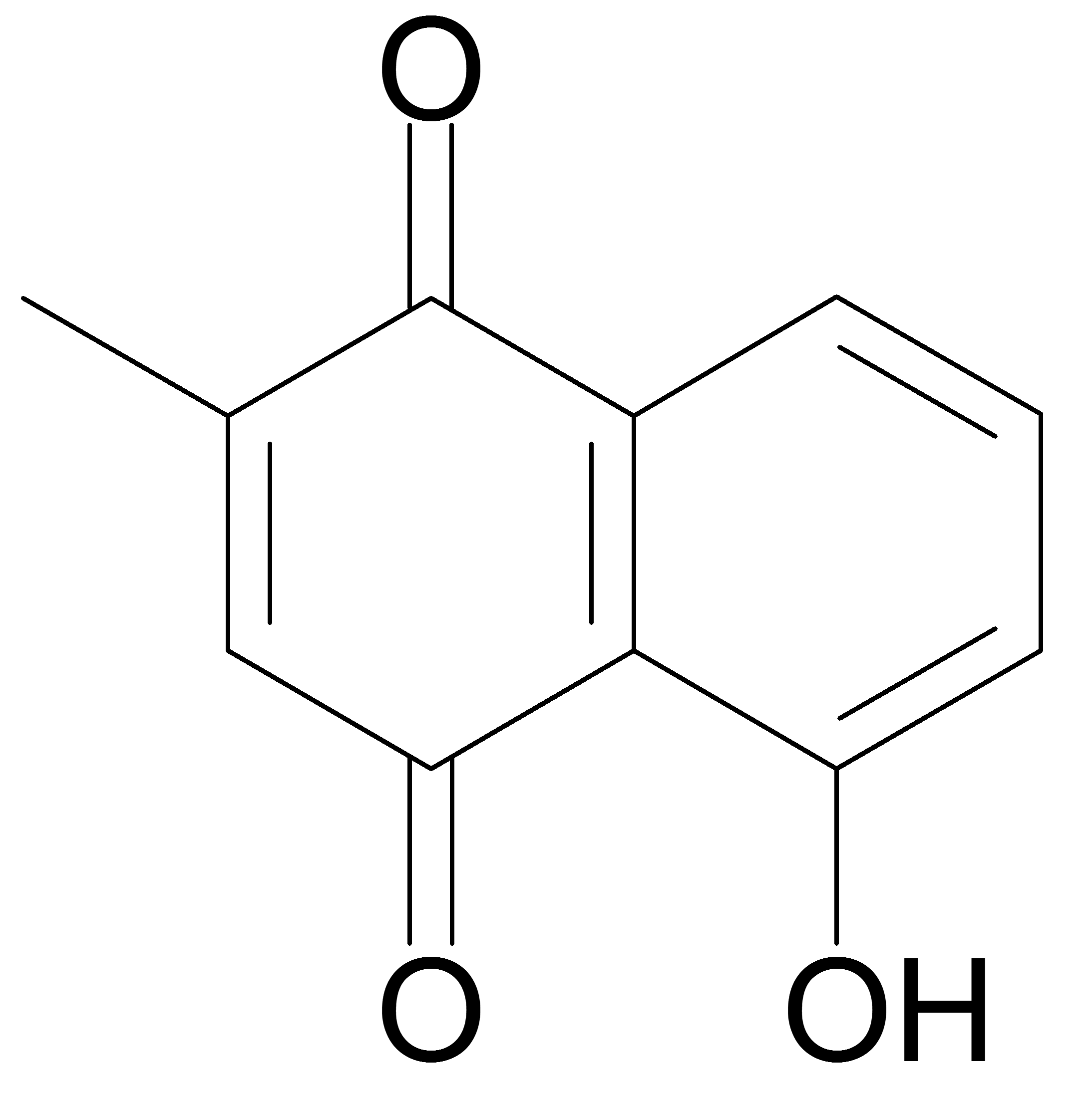
- Skeletal formula of plumbagin

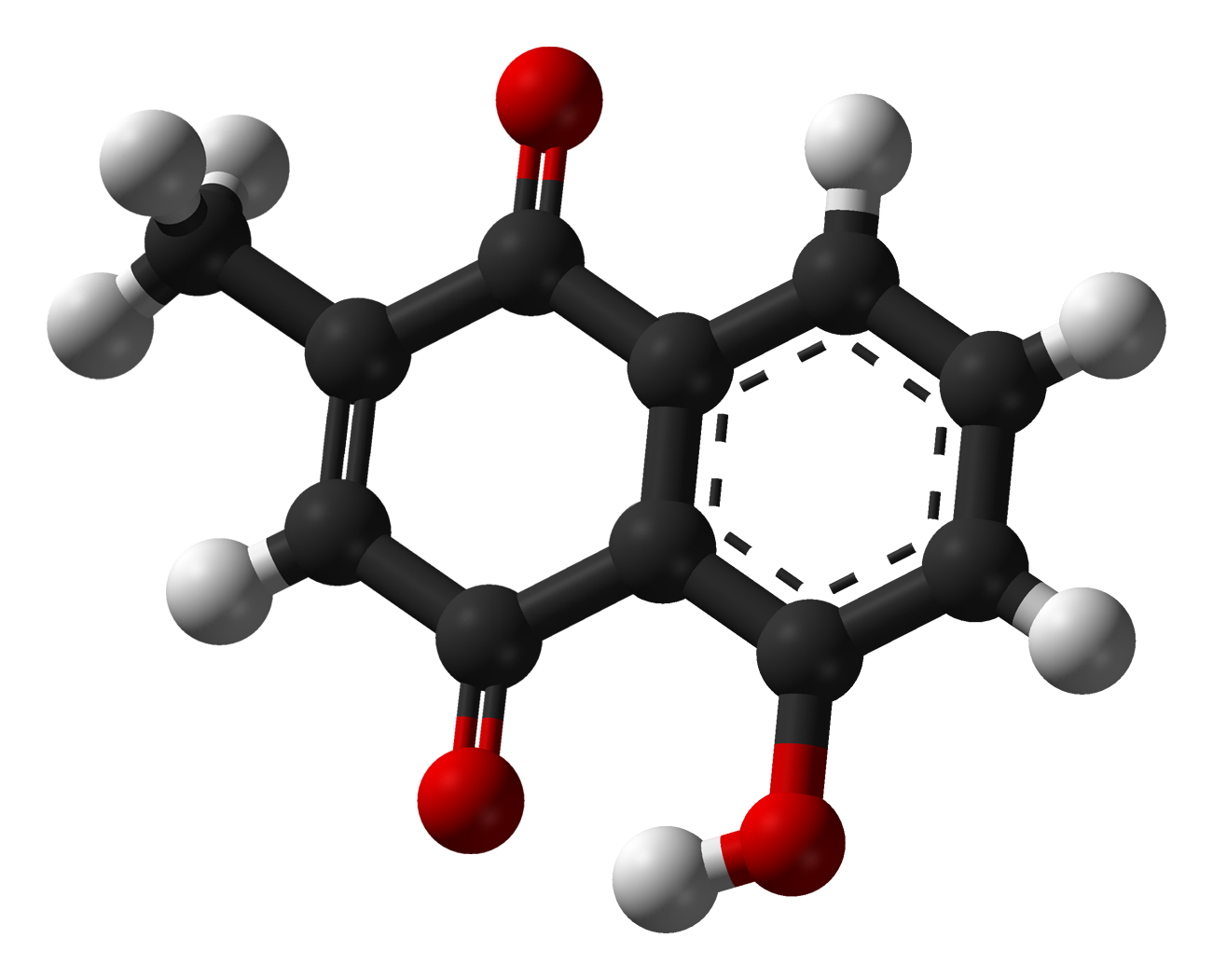
- Ball-and-stick model of plumbagin

Names
- Preferred IUPAC name 5-Hydroxy-2-methylnaphthalene-1,4-dione

Identifiers
CAS Number	481-42-5
3D model (JSmol)	Interactive image
ChEBI	CHEBI:8273
ChEMBL	ChEMBL295316
ChemSpider	9790
ECHA InfoCard	100.006.882
IUPHAR/BPS	7003
KEGG	C10387
PubChem CID	10205
UNII	YAS4TBQ4OQ
CompTox Dashboard (EPA)	DTXSID8075413
- InChI: InChI=1S/C11H8O3/c1-6-5-9(13)10-7(11(6)14)3-2-4-8(10)12/h2-5,12H,1H3 Key: VCMMXZQDRFWYSE-UHFFFAOYSA-N; InChI=1/C11H8O3/c1-6-5-9(13)10-7(11(6)14)3-2-4-8(10)12/h2-5,12H,1H3 Key: VCMMXZQDRFWYSE-UHFFFAOYAB
- SMILES: Oc1c2C(=O)cc(C)C(=O)c2ccc1

Properties
Chemical formula	C_{11}H_{8}O_{3}
Molar mass	188.17942 g/mol
- Except where otherwise noted, data are given for materials in their standard state (at 25 °C [77 °F], 100 kPa). verify (what is ?) Infobox references

Plumbagin or 5-hydroxy-2-methyl-1,4-naphthoquinone is an organic compound with the chemical formula C_{11}H_{8}O_{3}. It is regarded as a toxin and it is genotoxic and mutagenic.

Plumbagin is a yellow dye, formally derived from naphthoquinone.

It is named after the plant genus Plumbago, from which it was originally isolated. It is also commonly found in the carnivorous plant genera Drosera and Nepenthes. It is also a component of the black walnut drupe.

Plumbagin inhibits CYP2J2.

== See also ==
- Juglone
