= Juglone =

Chemical produced by walnut trees

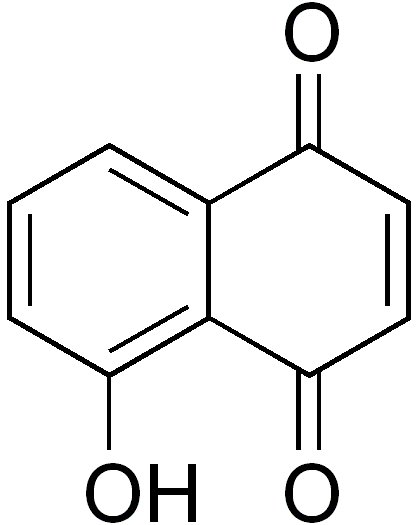
- Skeletal formula

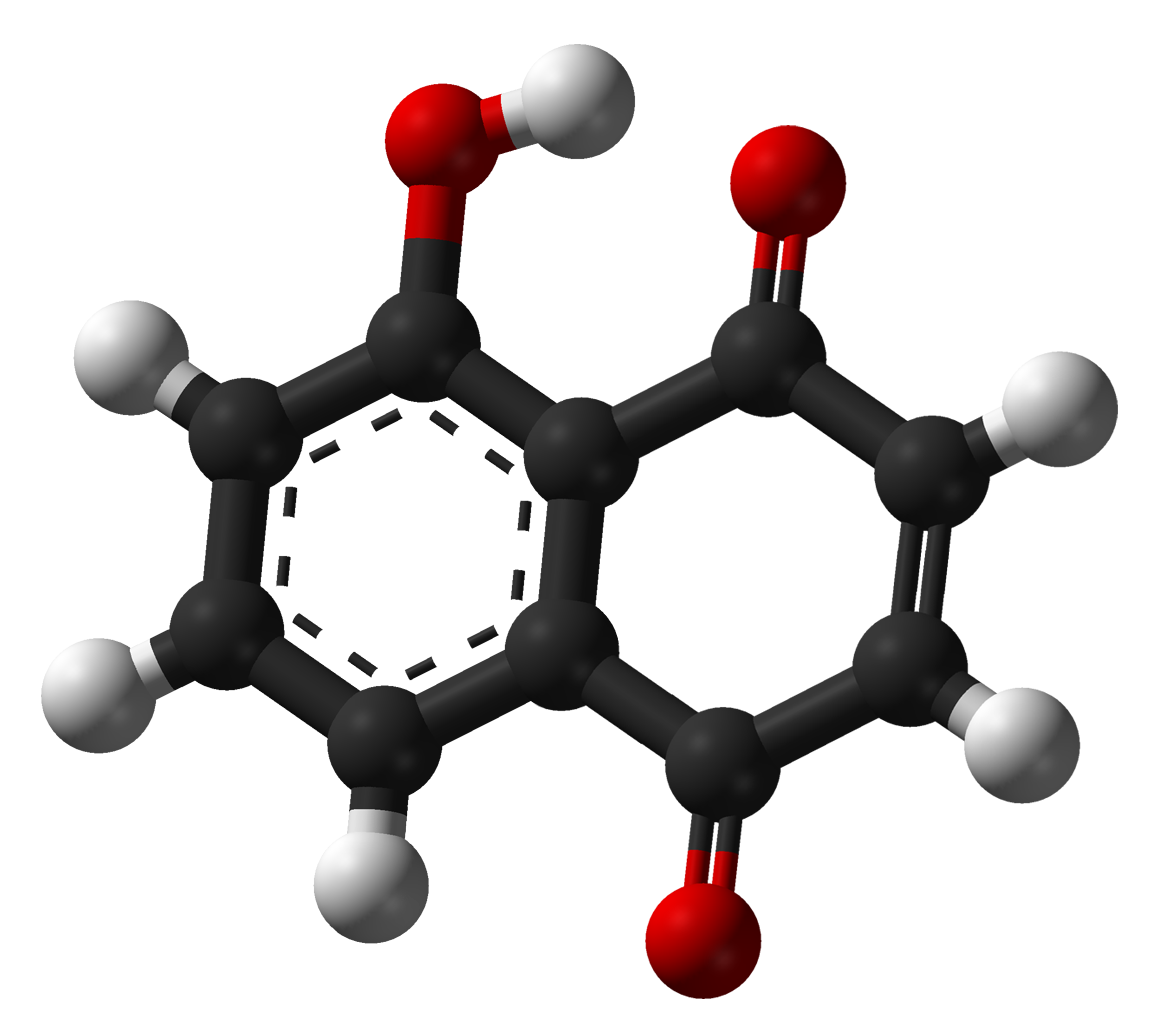
- Ball-and-stick model

Names
- Preferred IUPAC name 5-Hydroxynaphthalene-1,4-dione
- Other names: 5-Hydroxy-1,4-naphthoquinone; 5-Hydroxy-p-naphthoquinone; Regianin; 5-Hydroxynaphthoquinone; Nucin; NCI 2323; Oil Red BS; C.I. Natural Brown 7

Identifiers
CAS Number	481-39-0
3D model (JSmol)	Interactive image
Beilstein Reference	1909764
ChEBI	CHEBI:15794
ChEMBL	ChEMBL43612
ChemSpider	3674
ECHA InfoCard	100.006.880
EC Number	207-567-5
PubChem CID	3806
RTECS number	QJ5775000
UNII	W6Q80SK9L6
CompTox Dashboard (EPA)	DTXSID0031504
- InChI: InChI=1S/C10H6O3/c11-7-4-5-9(13)10-6(7)2-1-3-8(10)12/h1-5,12H Key: KQPYUDDGWXQXHS-UHFFFAOYSA-N; InChI=1/C10H6O3/c11-7-4-5-9(13)10-6(7)2-1-3-8(10)12/h1-5,12H Key: KQPYUDDGWXQXHS-UHFFFAOYAH
- SMILES: O=C\2c1c(c(O)ccc1)C(=O)/C=C/2

Properties
Chemical formula	C_{10}H_{6}O_{3}
Molar mass	174.155 g·mol^{−1}
Appearance	Yellow solid
Melting point	162 to 163 °C (324 to 325 °F; 435 to 436 K)
Solubility in water	Slightly sol.

Related compounds
Related compounds	quinone
- Except where otherwise noted, data are given for materials in their standard state (at 25 °C [77 °F], 100 kPa). verify (what is ?) Infobox references

Juglone, also called 5-hydroxy-1,4-naphthalenedione (IUPAC) or 5-hydroxy-1,4-napthoquinone is a phenolic organic compound with the molecular formula C_{10}H_{6}O_{3}. In the food industry, juglone is also known as C.I. Natural Brown 7 and C.I. 75500. It is insoluble in benzene but soluble in dioxane, from which it crystallizes as yellow needles. It is an isomer of lawsone, which is the active dye compound in the henna leaf.

Juglone occurs naturally in the leaves, roots, husks, fruit (the epicarp), and bark of plants in the Juglandaceae family, particularly the black walnut (Juglans nigra), and is toxic or growth-stunting to many types of plants. It is sometimes used as an herbicide, as a dye for cloth and inks, and as a coloring agent for foods and cosmetics.

== History ==
The allelopathic effects of walnut trees on other plants were observed as far back as the 1st century CE. Juglone itself was first isolated from black walnut in 1856, and was identified as the compound responsible for its allelopathic effects in 1881.

In 1921, a study observed that tomato plants near black walnut trees exhibited wilted leaves, suggesting an adverse interaction. In 1926, instances of apple tree damage caused by both Juglans nigra and Juglans cinerea (butternut) trees were reported in northern Virginia. Certain apple tree varieties displayed varying levels of resistance to walnut toxicity.

In 1926, it was observed that walnut trees in alfalfa fields resulted in crop death, while grass remained unaffected. Subsequent experiments indicated that the toxic compound within walnut trees exhibited limited solubility in water, implying that the compound underwent chemical changes upon leaving the tree. It was only in 1928 that the phytotoxic nature of the compound was identified for other plant species.

The scientific community faced controversy when the harmful effects of walnut trees on certain crops and trees were initially reported, following claims that the trees damaging apple trees in northern Virginia were not walnut trees at all.

In 1942 it was demonstrated that tomato and alfalfa germination and seedling growth were inhibited by contact with pieces of walnut roots, providing additional scientific evidence of juglone's phytotoxicity.

Juglone was used medicinally in America during the early 1900s, prescribed for the treatment of various skin diseases.

== Chemistry ==
=== Synthesis ===
Juglone is derived by oxidation of hydrojuglone, 1,5-dihydroxynaphthalene, after enzymatic hydrolysis. It can also be obtained by oxidations of 5,8-dihydroxy-1-tetralone with silver oxide (Ag_{2}O), manganese dioxide (MnO_{2}), or 2,3-dichloro-5,6-dicyano-1,4-benzoquinone (DDQ).

=== Extraction ===
Juglone has been extracted from the husk of walnut fruit, at concentrations of 2–4% by fresh weight.

=== Degradation ===
Before oxidization, juglone exists in plants such as walnuts in the form of colorless hydroxyjuglone, the hydroquinone analog. This is rapidly oxidized to juglone once exposed to air. The evidence that hydroxyjuglone is readily degraded is most apparent in the color change of walnut hulls from yellow to black after being freshly cut.

Indigenous bacteria found in the soil of black walnut roots, most notably Pseudomonas putida J1, are able to metabolize juglone and use it as their primary source of energy and carbon. Because of this, juglone is not so active as a cytotoxin in well-aerated soils.

=== Spectral data ===
The IR spectrum for juglone shows bands at 3400, 1662, and 1641 cm^{−1}, which are characteristic respectively of the hydroxyl and two carbonyl groups. The ^{13}C-NMR spectrum shows 10 signals, including at 160.6, 183.2, and 189.3 ppm for the hydroxyl and two carbonyl carbons.

== Biological effects ==
Juglone is an allelopathic compound, a substance produced by a plant to stunt the growth of another plant. Juglone affects germination of plants less than it affects growth of the root and stem systems. In below average concentrations, it has increased the rate of germination in some coniferous seeds.

Juglone exerts its effect by inhibiting certain enzymes needed for metabolic function. This in turn inhibits the effects of respiration of mitochondria and inhibits photosynthesis found in common crops such as maize and soy at juglone concentrations that are at or below those common in nature. In addition to these inhibitions, juglone has been shown to alter the relationship between plants and water because of its effect on stomatal functioning.

The rise in popularity of alley cropping with black walnut trees and maize in the American Midwest, due to the high value of black walnut trees, has led to certain studies being conducted about the particular relationship between the two species. Research has shown that juglone affects the yield of maize crops; however, the practice of pruning and usage of root barriers greatly reduce these effects.

Some plants and trees are resistant to juglone including some species of maple (Acer), birch (Betula), and beech (Fagus).

It is highly toxic to many insect herbivores. However, some of them, example Actias luna (Luna moth), can detoxify juglone (and related naphthoquinones) to non-toxic 1,4,5-trihydroxynaphthalene. It has also shown anthelmintic (expelling parasitic worms) activity on mature and immature Hymenolepis nana in mice. Naphthoquinonic compounds also exhibit antimicrobial activity.

== Uses ==
Juglone is occasionally used as an herbicide. Traditionally, juglone has been used as a natural dye for clothing and fabrics, particularly wool, and as ink. Because of its tendency to create dark orange-brown stains, juglone has also found use as a coloring agent for foods and cosmetics, such as hair dyes.

== See also ==
- Plumbagin
