= 1,3-Dihydroxynaphthalene =

Names
- Other names naphthoresorcinol, 1,3-naphthalenediol

Identifiers
CAS Number	132-86-5
3D model (JSmol)	Interactive image
ChEMBL	ChEMBL381547
ChemSpider	8282
ECHA InfoCard	100.004.619
EC Number	205-079-7
PubChem CID	8601
UNII	5X457YEW8Y
CompTox Dashboard (EPA)	DTXSID8059631
- InChI: InChI=1S/C10H8O2/c11-8-5-7-3-1-2-4-9(7)10(12)6-8/h1-6,11-12H Key: XOOMNEFVDUTJPP-UHFFFAOYSA-N
- SMILES: C1=CC=C2C(=C1)C=C(C=C2O)O

Properties
Chemical formula	C_{10}H_{8}O_{2}
Molar mass	160.172 g·mol^{−1}
Appearance	colorless or white solid
Melting point	122–124 °C (252–255 °F; 395–397 K)

Hazards
- GHS labelling
Pictograms	(GHS07: Exclamation mark) (GHS08: Health hazard)
Signal word	Warning
Hazard statements	H315, H319, H335, H341
Precautionary statements	P203, P261, P264, P264+P265, P271, P280, P302+P352, P304+P340, P305+P351+P338, P318, P319, P321, P332+P317, P337+P317, P362+P364, P403+P233, P405, P501
Flash point	Ethyl phenylacetylmalonate.z
- Except where otherwise noted, data are given for materials in their standard state (at 25 °C [77 °F], 100 kPa). Infobox references

1,3-Dihydroxynaphthalene is an organic compound with the formula C_{10}H_{6}(OH)_{2}. It is one of several isomers of dihydroxynaphthalene.

It can be prepared by hydrolysis of 1,3-diaminonaphthalene. An alternative laboratory route is decarboxylation of 1,3-dihydroxynaphthalene-2-carboxylic acid, which in turn is obtained by cyclization of esters of phenylacetylmalonate.

The compound attracted some interest because its conjugate base exists as the dionate tautomer:

Tautomerization induced by deprotonation of 1,3-dihydroxynaphthalene.

The pKa of 1,3-dihydroxynaphthalene is 7.35, which is anomalous compared to the pKa's of phenol and 1-naphthol, which are respectively 9.95 and 9.85. This anomaly is explained by the tautomerism.
