= Dihydroxynaphthalene =

Class of chemical compounds

Dihydroxynaphthalene can refer to any of the following ten isomers:

- 1,2-Dihydroxynaphthalene
- 1,3-Dihydroxynaphthalene
- 1,4-Dihydroxynaphthalene
- 1,5-Dihydroxynaphthalene
- 1,6-Dihydroxynaphthalene
- 1,7-Dihydroxynaphthalene
- 1,8-Dihydroxynaphthalene
- 2,3-Dihydroxynaphthalene
- 2,6-Dihydroxynaphthalene
- 2,7-Dihydroxynaphthalene
