= 1,5-Dihydroxynaphthalene =

Names
- Preferred IUPAC name Naphthalene-1,5-diol
- Other names Azurol; 1,5-Naphthalenediol

Identifiers
CAS Number	83-56-7
3D model (JSmol)	Interactive image
ChemSpider	6492
ECHA InfoCard	100.001.353
PubChem CID	6749
UNII	P25HC23VH6
CompTox Dashboard (EPA)	DTXSID2052574
- InChI: InChI=1S/C10H8O2/c11-9-5-1-3-7-8(9)4-2-6-10(7)12/h1-6,11-12H Key: BOKGTLAJQHTOKE-UHFFFAOYSA-N; InChI=1/C10H8O2/c11-9-5-1-3-7-8(9)4-2-6-10(7)12/h1-6,11-12H Key: BOKGTLAJQHTOKE-UHFFFAOYAJ
- SMILES: c1cc2c(cccc2O)c(c1)O

Properties
Chemical formula	C_{10}H_{8}O_{2}
Molar mass	160.172 g·mol^{−1}
Appearance	white solid
Melting point	259–261 °C (498–502 °F; 532–534 K)
- Except where otherwise noted, data are given for materials in their standard state (at 25 °C [77 °F], 100 kPa). Infobox references

1,5-Dihydroxynaphthalene is an organic compound with the formula C_{10}H_{6}(OH)_{2}. It is one of several isomers of dihydroxynaphthalene. A white solid, degraded samples often appear grey to light brown solid that are soluble in polar organic solvents. It is a precursor to certain dyes.

== Preparation and use ==
1,5-Dihydroxynaphthalene is prepared from naphthalene-1,5-disulfonic acid by hydrolysis with strong base followed by acidification.

It couples with various aryl diazonium salts to give diazo dyes. Oxidation with chromium trioxide gives juglone, a naturally occurring dye.

In supramolecular chemistry, 1,5-dihydroxynaphthalene is a popular reagent.
