= 3C-2V =

Type of coaxial cable

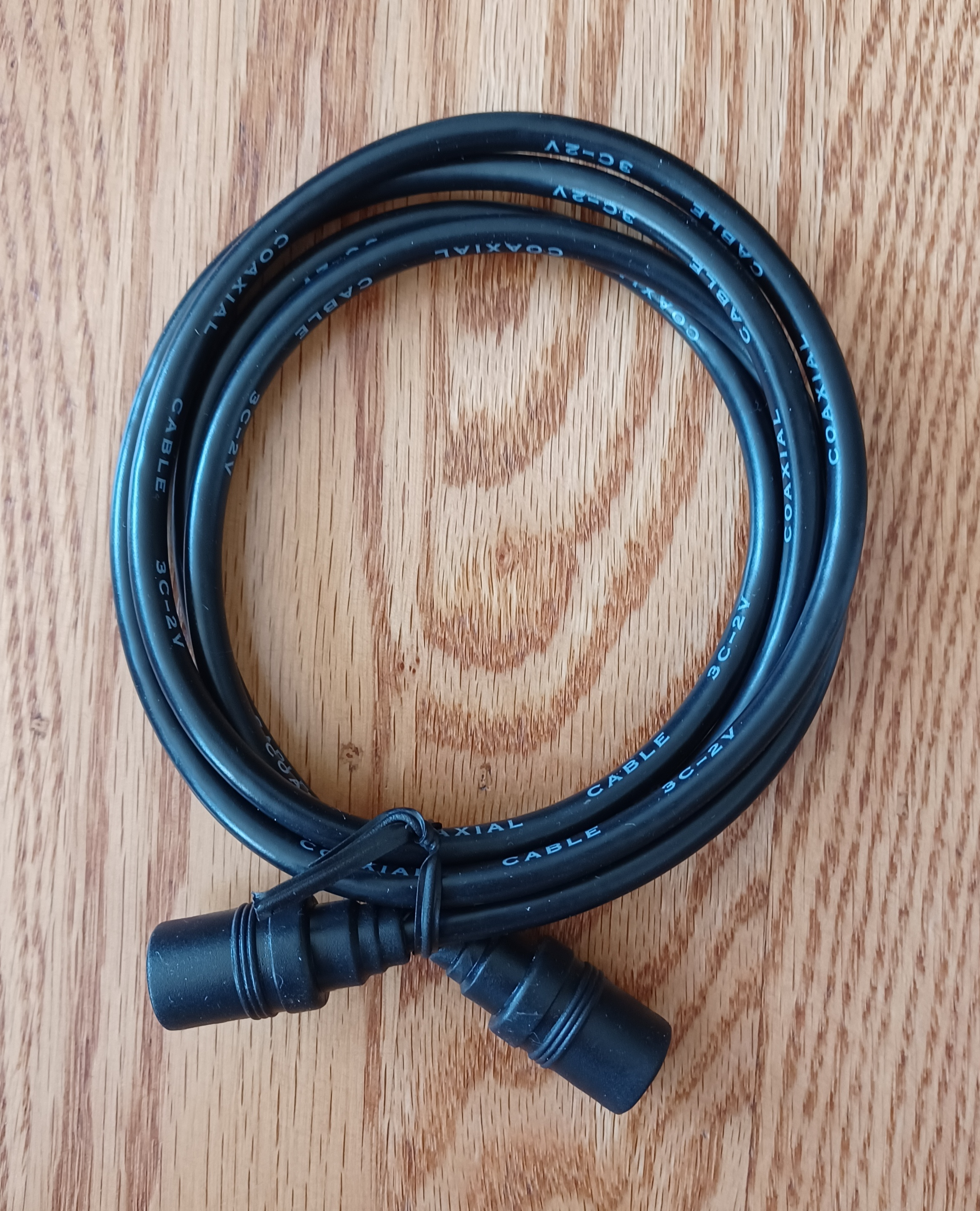
A 3C-2V cable

3C-2V is commonly marked on low cost coaxial cable used for domestic TV signals.

It is one of the options of the Japanese cable standard JIS C 3501.

- The 3 indicates approx diameter of the conductive core plus the dielectric (diameter of conductive core =0.5 mm, dielectric thickness =1.3 mm)
- The C indicates a characteristic impedance of 75 ohms
- The 2 indicates a solid PE dielectric core
- The V indicates a single braided outer conductor (W would be double)

Nominal loss at 100 MHz is 42 dB/km.

With its narrow core it is similar to RG-59 cable; RG-6 coax cable is better shielded and has lower losses.

== Gallery ==
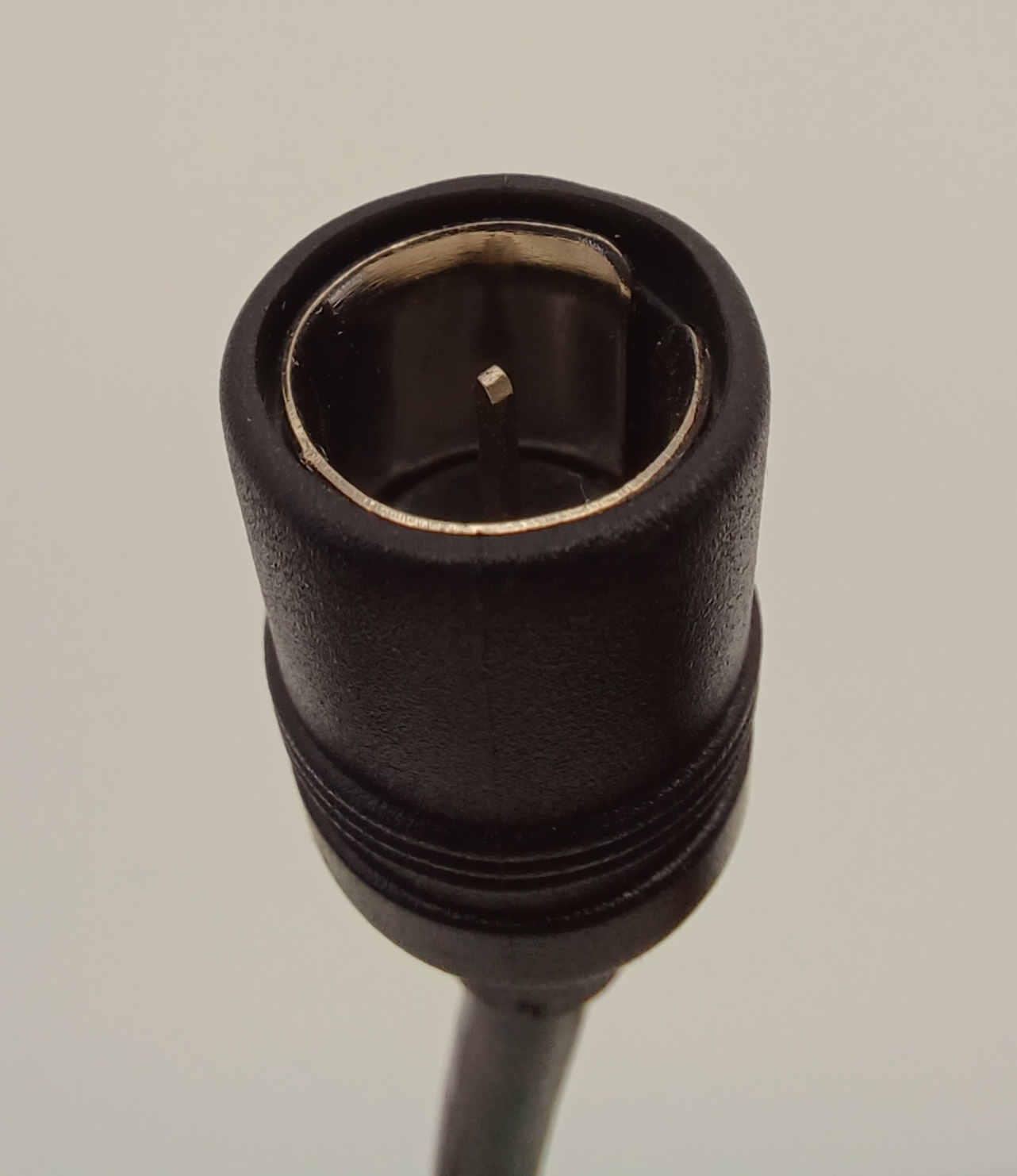
Connector

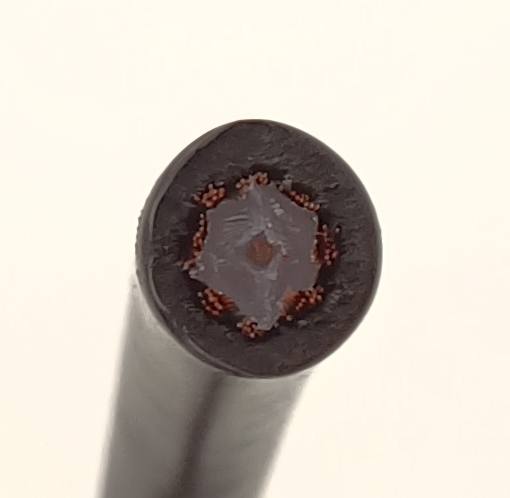
Cross section

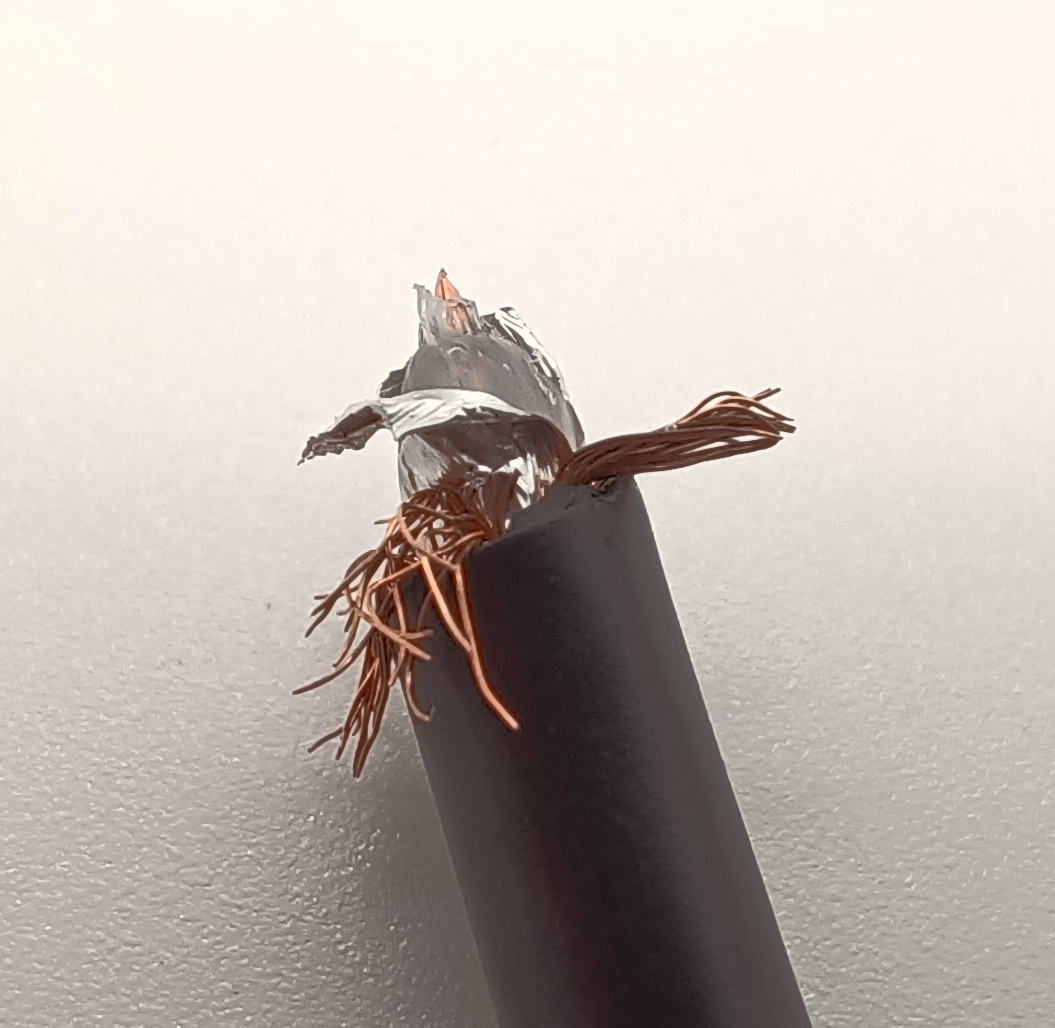
Internal structure
