= RG-58 =

Type of coaxial cable

RG-58/U is a type of coaxial cable often used for low-power signal and RF connections. The cable has a characteristic impedance of either 50 or 52 Ω. "RG" was originally a unit indicator for bulk RF cable in the U.S. military's Joint Electronics Type Designation System. There are several versions covering the differences in core material (solid or braided wire) and shield (70% to 95% coverage).

The outside diameter of RG-58 is around 0.2 inches (5 mm). RG-58 weighs around 0.025 lb/ft (37 g/m), exhibits approximately 25 pF/ft (82 pF/m) capacitance and can tolerate a maximum of 300 V potential (1800 W). Plain RG-58 cable has a solid center conductor. The RG-58A/U features a flexible 7- or 19-strand center conductor.

Most two-way radio communication systems, such as marine, CB radio, amateur, police, fire, WLAN antennas etc., are designed to work with a 50 Ω cable.

RG-58 cable is often used as a generic carrier of signals in laboratories, combined with BNC connectors that are common on test and measurement equipment such as oscilloscopes.

RG-58 in versions RG-58A/U or RG-58C/U was once widely used in "thin" Ethernet (10BASE2), for which it provides a maximum segment length of 185 meters. However, it has been almost completely replaced by twisted-pair cabling such as Cat 5, Cat 6, and similar cables in data networking applications.

RG-58 cable can be used for moderately high frequencies. Its signal attenuation depends on the frequency, e.g. from 10.8 dB per 100 m (3.3 dB per 100 feet) at 50 MHz to 70.5 dB per 100 m (21.5 dB per 100 feet) at 1 GHz.

== See also ==
- RG-59—A similar cable but with an impedance of 75 Ω
- Coaxial cable
- BNC connector—common connector for RG-58 cables
