= RG-59 =

Type of coaxial cable

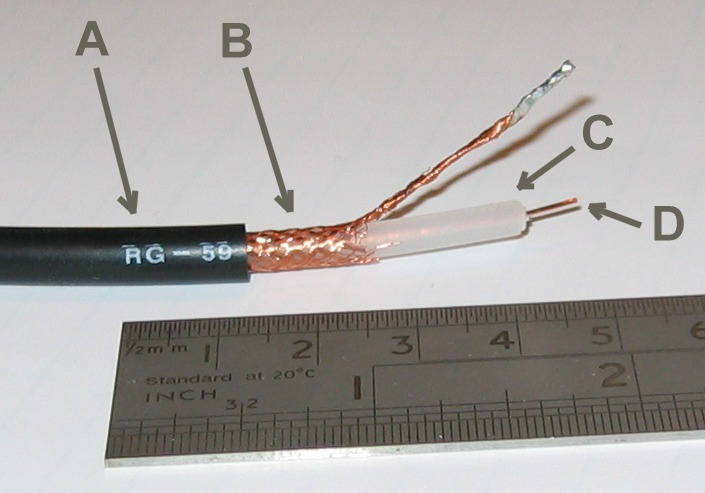
A section of RG-59 cable with its end stripped.: 1. Outer plastic sheath; 2. Copper braid shield; 3. Inner dielectric insulator; 4. Copper-plated core (sometimes solid core)

RG-59/U is a specific type of coaxial cable, often used for low-power video and RF signal connections. The cable has a characteristic impedance of 75 ohms, and a capacitance of around 20pF/ft (60pF/m). The 75 ohm impedance matches a dipole antenna in free space. RG (for radio guide) was originally a unit indicator for bulk radio frequency (RF) cable in the U.S. military's Joint Electronics Type Designation System. The suffix /U means for general utility use. The number 59 was assigned sequentially. The RG unit indicator is no longer part of the JETDS system (MIL-STD-196E) and cable sold today under the RG-59 label does not necessarily meet military specifications.

RG-59 is often used at baseband video frequencies, such as composite video. It may also be used for broadcast frequencies, but its high-frequency losses are too high to allow its use over long distances; in these applications, RG-6 or RG-11 are used instead. In cases where the transmission distance is too long for these media, such options as UTP (unshielded twisted pair) or fiber optic can be used.

RG-59 coaxial cable is commonly packed with consumer equipment, such as VCRs or digital cable/satellite receivers. Manufacturers tend to include only RG-59 cables because it costs less than RG-6 does. However, given the short lengths provided (usually 4–6 ft or 1.2–1.8 m), this is generally sufficient for its typical use.

RG-59 is frequently used to synchronize two digital audio devices, such as ADAT optical devices. This is called word clock.

== See also ==
- BNC connector
- Coaxial cable
- RG-58 – A similar cable but with an impedance of 50 or 52 ohms

== Bibliography ==
- Straw, Dean. The ARRL Handbook for Radio Communications 2006 (83rd ed.). Newington, CT: American Radio Relay League. ISBN 0-87259-949-3. OCLC 62026192.
