= Optical fiber, nonconductive, riser =

Optical fiber, nonconductive, riser (OFNR) is a type of optical fiber cable. As designated by the National Fire Protection Association (NFPA), this name is used for interior fiber-optic cables which contain no electrically conductive components, and which are certified for use in riser applications; they are engineered to prevent the spread of fire from floor to floor in a building. Typically they are tested for compliance with ANSI/UL 1666–1997, Standard Test for Flame Propagation Height of Electrical and Optical-Fiber Cable Installed Vertically in Shafts. NFPA NEC 2005 Art 770.51(B) FPN.

They are distinct from optical fiber, nonconductive, plenum cable (OFNP), and general-purpose optical cable.

== Related abbreviations ==
Underwriters Laboratories defines the following related abbreviations :

- OFC: Optical fiber, conductive
- OFN: Optical fiber, nonconductive
- OFCG: Optical fiber, conductive, general use
- OFNG: Optical fiber, nonconductive, general use
- OFCP: Optical fiber, conductive, plenum
- OFNP: Optical fiber, nonconductive, plenum
- OFCR: Optical fiber, conductive, riser
- OFNR: Optical fiber, nonconductive, riser
