= Coaxial cable =

Electrical cable with concentric conductors

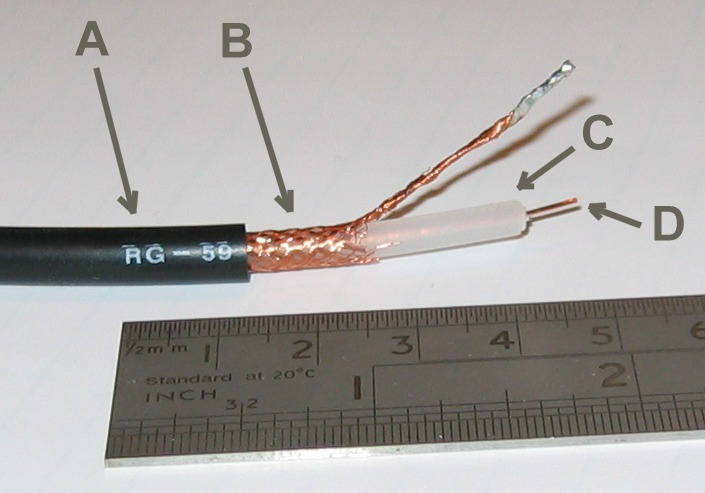
RG-59 flexible coaxial cable composed of: 1. Plastic sheath; 2. Woven copper shield; 3. Dielectric insulator; 4. Copper core

Coaxial cable, or coax (pronounced /ˈkoʊ.æks/), is a type of electrical cable consisting of an inner center conductor surrounded by a concentric conducting shield, with the two separated by a dielectric (insulating material); many coaxial cables also have a protective outer sheath or jacket. The term coaxial refers to the inner conductor and the outer shield sharing a geometric axis.

Coaxial cable is a type of unbalanced transmission line, used to carry high-frequency electrical signals with low losses. It is used in such applications as telephone trunk lines, broadband internet networking cables, high-speed computer data buses, cable television signals, and connecting radio transmitters and receivers to their antennas. It differs from other shielded cables because the dimensions of the cable and connectors are controlled to give a precise, constant conductor spacing, which is needed for it to function efficiently as a transmission line.

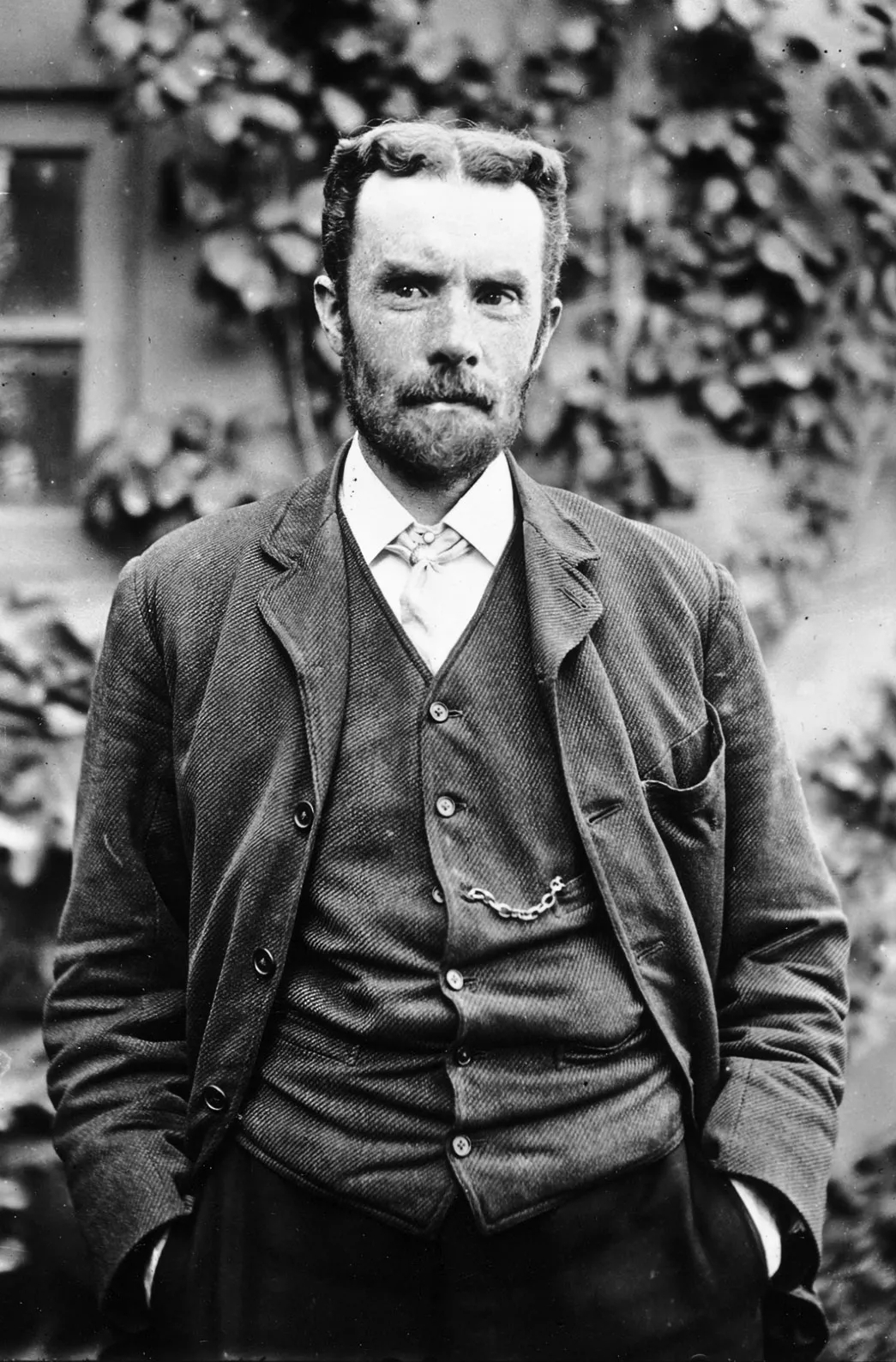
In his 1880 British patent, Oliver Heaviside showed how coaxial cable could eliminate signal interference between parallel cables.

Coaxial cable was used in the first (1858) and following transatlantic cable installations, but its theory was not described until 1880 by English physicist, engineer, and mathematician Oliver Heaviside, who patented the design in that year (British patent No. 1,407).

== Applications ==
Coaxial cable is used as a transmission line for radio frequency signals. Its applications include feedlines connecting radio transmitters and receivers to their antennas, computer network (e.g., Ethernet) connections, digital audio (S/PDIF), and distribution of cable television signals. One advantage of coaxial over other types of radio transmission line is that in an ideal coaxial cable the electromagnetic field carrying the signal exists only in the space between the inner and outer conductors. This allows coaxial cable runs to be installed next to metal objects such as gutters without the power losses that occur in other types of transmission lines. Coaxial cable also provides protection of the signal from external electromagnetic interference.

== Description ==
Coaxial cable cutaway (not to scale)

Coaxial cable conducts electrical signals using an inner conductor (usually a solid copper, stranded copper or copper-plated steel wire) surrounded by an insulating layer and all enclosed by a shield, typically one to four layers of woven metallic braid and metallic tape. The cable is protected by an outer insulating jacket. Normally, the outside of the shield is kept at ground potential and a signal carrying voltage is applied to the centre conductor. When using differential signaling, coaxial cable provides an advantage of equal push-pull currents on the inner conductor and inside of the outer conductor that restrict the signal's electric and magnetic fields to the dielectric, with little leakage outside the shield. Further, if at the receiving end, a balun is used to constrain the currents from the inner and outer to equal and opposite, then electric and magnetic fields outside the cable are largely kept from interfering with signals inside the cable. This property makes coaxial cable a good choice both for carrying weak signals that cannot tolerate interference from the environment, and for stronger electrical signals that must not be allowed to radiate or couple into adjacent structures or circuits. Larger diameter cables and cables with multiple shields have less leakage.

Common applications of coaxial cable include video and CATV distribution, RF and microwave transmission, and computer and instrumentation data connections.

The characteristic impedance of the cable (Z_{0}) is determined by the dielectric constant of the inner insulator and the radii of the inner and outer conductors. In radio frequency systems, where the cable length is comparable to the wavelength of the signals transmitted, a uniform cable characteristic impedance is important to minimize loss. The source and load impedances are chosen to match the impedance of the cable to ensure maximum power transfer and minimum standing wave ratio. Other important properties of coaxial cable include attenuation as a function of frequency, voltage handling capability, and shield quality.

== Construction ==
Coaxial cable design choices affect physical size, frequency performance, attenuation, power handling capabilities, flexibility, strength, and cost. The inner conductor might be solid or stranded; stranded is more flexible. To get better high-frequency performance, the inner conductor may be silver-plated. Copper-plated steel wire is often used as an inner conductor for cable used in the cable TV industry.

The insulator surrounding the inner conductor may be solid plastic, a foam plastic, or air with spacers supporting the inner wire. The properties of the dielectric insulator determine some of the electrical properties of the cable. A common choice is a solid polyethylene (PE) insulator, used in lower-loss cables. Solid Teflon (PTFE) is also used as an insulator, and exclusively in plenum-rated cables. Some coaxial lines use air (or some other gas) and have spacers to keep the inner conductor from touching the shield.

Many conventional coaxial cables use braided copper wire forming the shield. This allows the cable to be flexible, but it also means there are gaps in the shield layer, and the inner dimension of the shield varies slightly because the braid cannot be flat. Sometimes the braid is silver-plated. For better shield performance, some cables have a double-layer shield. The shield might be just two braids, but it is more common now to have a thin foil shield covered by a wire braid. Some cables may invest in more than two shield layers, such as "quad-shield", which uses four alternating layers of foil and braid. Other shield designs sacrifice flexibility for better performance; some shields are a solid metal tube. Those cables cannot be bent sharply, as the shield will kink, causing losses in the cable. When a foil shield is used a small wire conductor incorporated into the foil makes soldering the shield termination easier.

For high-power radio-frequency transmission up to about 1 GHz, coaxial cable with a solid copper outer conductor is available in sizes of 0.25 inch upward. The outer conductor is corrugated like a bellows to permit flexibility and the inner conductor is held in position by a plastic spiral to approximate an air dielectric. One brand name for such cable is Heliax.

Coaxial cables require an internal structure of an insulating (dielectric) material to maintain the spacing between the centre conductor and shield. The dielectric losses increase in this order: Ideal dielectric (no loss), vacuum, air, polytetrafluoroethylene (PTFE), polyethylene foam, and solid polyethylene. An inhomogeneous dielectric needs to be compensated by a non-circular conductor to avoid current hot-spots.

While many cables have a solid dielectric, many others have a foam dielectric that contains as much air or other gas as possible to reduce the losses by allowing the use of a larger diameter centre conductor. Foam coax will have about 15% less attenuation but some types of foam dielectric can absorb moisture—especially at its many surfaces—in humid environments, significantly increasing the loss. Supports shaped like stars or spokes are even better but more expensive and very susceptible to moisture infiltration. Still more expensive were the air-spaced coaxials used for some inter-city communications in the mid-20th century. The centre conductor was suspended by polyethylene discs every few centimetres. In some low-loss coaxial cables such as the RG-62 type, the inner conductor is supported by a spiral strand of polyethylene, so that an air space exists between most of the conductor and the inside of the jacket. The lower dielectric constant of air allows for a greater inner diameter at the same impedance and a greater outer diameter at the same cutoff frequency, lowering ohmic losses. Inner conductors are sometimes silver-plated to smooth the surface and reduce losses due to skin effect. A rough surface extends the current path and concentrates the current at peaks, thus increasing ohmic loss.

The insulating jacket can be made from many materials. A common choice is PVC, but some applications may require fire-resistant materials. Outdoor applications may require the jacket to resist ultraviolet light, oxidation, rodent damage, or direct burial. Flooded coaxial cables use a water-blocking gel to protect the cable from water infiltration through minor cuts in the jacket. For internal chassis connections the insulating jacket may be omitted.

== Signal propagation ==
Twin-lead transmission lines have the property that the electromagnetic wave propagating down the line extends into the space surrounding the parallel wires. These lines have low loss, but also have undesirable characteristics. They cannot be bent, tightly twisted, or otherwise shaped without changing their characteristic impedance, causing reflection of the signal back toward the source. They also cannot be buried or run along or attached to anything conductive, as the extended fields will induce currents in the nearby conductors causing unwanted radiation and detuning of the line. Standoff insulators are used to keep them away from parallel metal surfaces. Coaxial lines largely solve this problem by confining virtually all of the electromagnetic wave to the area inside the cable. Coaxial lines can therefore be bent and moderately twisted without negative effects, and they can be strapped to conductive supports without inducing unwanted currents in them, so long as provisions are made to ensure differential signalling push-pull currents in the cable.

In radio-frequency applications up to a few gigahertz, the wave propagates primarily in the transverse electric magnetic (TEM) mode, which means that the electric and magnetic fields are both perpendicular to the direction of propagation. However, above a certain cutoff frequency, transverse electric (TE) or transverse magnetic (TM) modes can also propagate, as they do in a hollow waveguide. It is usually undesirable to transmit signals above the cutoff frequency, since it may cause multiple modes with different phase velocities to propagate, interfering with each other. The outer diameter is roughly inversely proportional to the cutoff frequency. A propagating surface-wave mode that only involves the central conductor also exists, but is effectively suppressed in coaxial cable of conventional geometry and common impedance. Electric field lines for this TM mode have a longitudinal component and require line lengths of a half-wavelength or longer.

Coaxial cable may be viewed as a type of waveguide. Power is transmitted through the radial electric field and the circumferential magnetic field in the TEM mode. This is the dominant mode from zero frequency (DC) to an upper limit determined by the electrical dimensions of the cable.

== Connectors ==
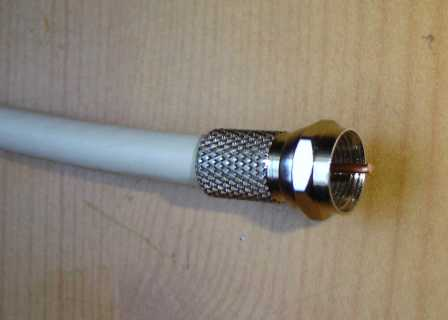
A male F-type connector used with common RG-6 and RG-59 cable

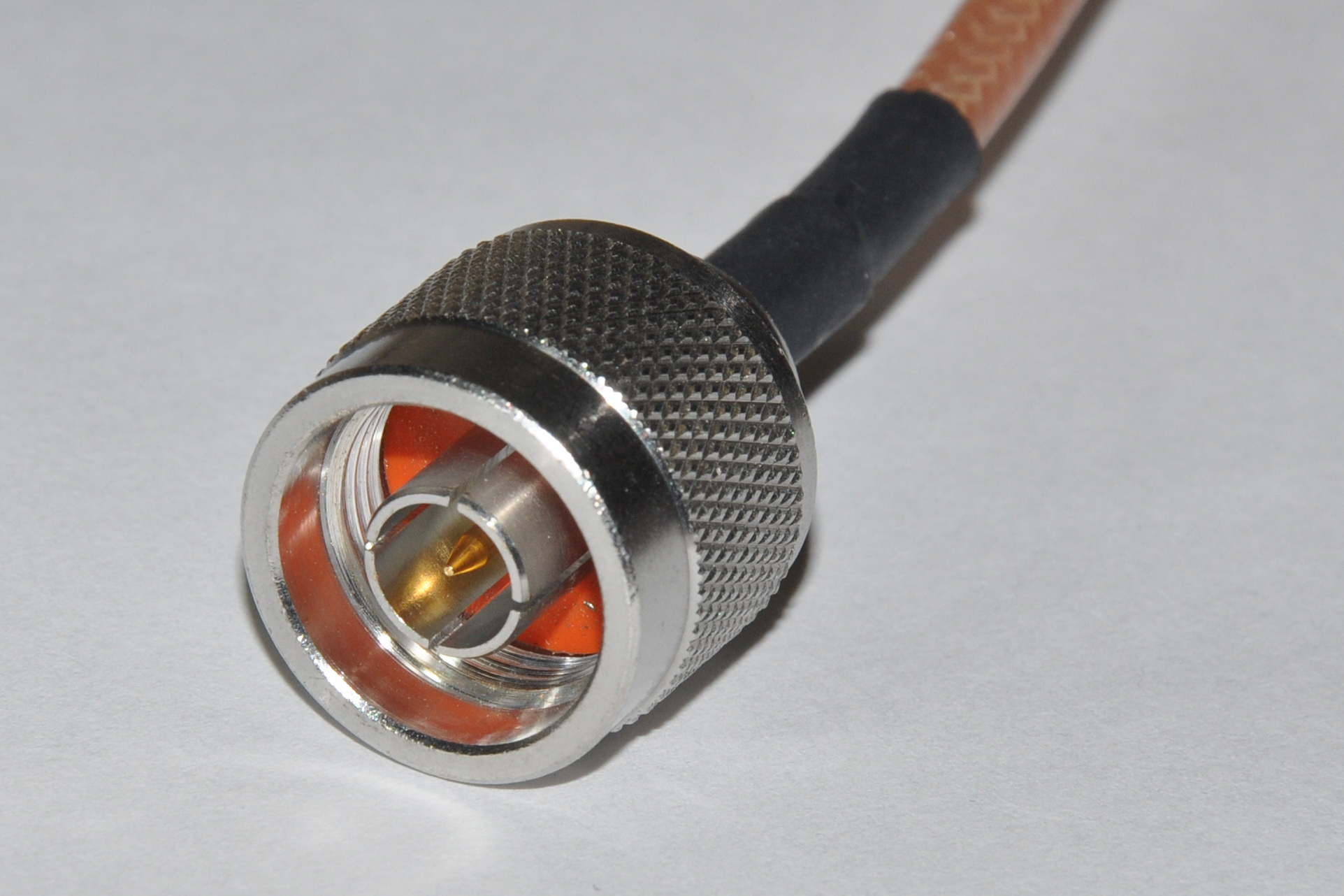
A male N-type connector

Coaxial connectors are designed to maintain a coaxial form across the connection and have the same impedance as the attached cable. Connectors are usually plated with high-conductivity metals such as silver or tarnish-resistant gold. Due to the skin effect, the RF signal is only carried by the plating at higher frequencies and does not penetrate to the connector body. Silver however tarnishes quickly and the silver sulfide that is produced is poorly conductive, degrading connector performance, making silver a poor choice for this application.

== Important parameters ==
Coaxial cable is a particular kind of transmission line, so the circuit models developed for general transmission lines are appropriate. See Telegrapher's equation.

Schematic representation of the elementary components of a transmission line

Schematic representation of a coaxial transmission line, showing the characteristic impedance $Z_0$

=== Physical parameters ===
In the following section, these symbols are used:

- Length $\ell$ of the cable.
- Outside diameter $d$ of inner conductor.
- Inside diameter $D$ of the shield.
- Dielectric constant $\epsilon$ of the insulator. The dielectric constant is often quoted as the relative dielectric constant $\epsilon_\text{r}$ referred to the dielectric constant $\epsilon_0$ of free space: $\epsilon = \epsilon_\text{r} \epsilon_0.$ When the insulator is a mixture of different dielectric materials (e.g., polyethylene foam is a mixture of polyethylene and air), then the term effective dielectric constant $\epsilon_\text{eff}$ is often used.
- Magnetic permeability $\mu$ of the insulator. Permeability is often quoted as the relative permeability $\mu_\text{r}$ referred to the permeability $\mu_0$ of free space: $\mu = \mu_\text{r} \mu_0.$ The relative permeability will almost always be 1.

=== Fundamental electrical parameters ===
- Shunt capacitance per unit length, in farads per metre:
  $$C = \frac{2 \pi \epsilon}{\ln \frac{D}{d}} = \frac{2 \pi \epsilon_0 \epsilon_\text{r}}{\ln \frac{D}{d}}.$$
- Series inductance per unit length, in henries per metre, considering the central conductor to be a thin hollow cylinder (due to skin effect):
  $$L = \frac{\mu}{2 \pi} \ln \frac{D}{d} = \frac{\mu_0 \mu_\text{r}}{2 \pi} \ln \frac{D}{d}.$$
- Series resistance per unit length, in ohms per metre. The resistance per unit length is just the resistance of inner conductor and the shield at low frequencies. At higher frequencies, skin effect increases the effective resistance by confining the conduction to a thin layer of each conductor.
- Shunt conductance per unit length, in siemens per metre. The shunt conductance is usually very small because insulators with good dielectric properties are used (a very low loss tangent). At high frequencies, a dielectric can have a significant resistive loss.

=== Derived electrical parameters ===
- Characteristic impedance in ohms (Ω). The complex impedance Z_{0} of an infinite length of transmission line is
  $$Z_0 = \sqrt{\frac{R + sL}{G + sC}},$$
  where R is the resistance per unit length, L is the inductance per unit length, G is the conductance per unit length of the dielectric, C is the capacitance per unit length, and s = jω = j2πf is the frequency. The "per unit length" dimensions cancel out in the impedance formula. At DC the two reactive terms are zero, so the impedance is real-valued, and is extremely high. It looks like
  $$Z_\text{DC} = \sqrt{\frac{R}{G}}.$$
  With increasing frequency, the reactive components take effect, and the impedance of the line is complex-valued. At very low frequencies (audio range, of interest to telephone systems) G is typically much smaller than sC, so the impedance at low frequencies is
  $$Z_\text{LF} \approx \sqrt{\frac{R}{sC}},$$
  which has a phase value of −45°. At higher frequencies, the reactive terms usually dominate R and G, and the cable impedance again becomes real-valued. That value is Z_{0}, the characteristic impedance of the cable:
  $$Z_0 = \sqrt{\frac{sL}{sC}} = \sqrt{\frac{L}{C}}.$$
  Assuming that the dielectric properties of the material inside the cable do not vary appreciably over the operating range of the cable, the characteristic impedance is frequency independent above about five times the shield cutoff frequency. For typical coaxial cables, the shield cutoff frequency is 600 Hz (for RG-6A) to 2,000 Hz (for RG-58C).
  The parameters L and C are determined from the ratio of the inner (d) and outer (D) diameters and the dielectric constant (ε). The characteristic impedance is given by
  $$Z_0 = \frac{1}{2\pi} \sqrt{\frac{\mu}{\epsilon}} \ln \frac{D}{d} \approx
\frac{59.96~\Omega}{\sqrt{\epsilon_\text{r}}} \ln \frac{D}{d} \approx
\frac{138~\Omega}{\sqrt{\epsilon_\text{r}}} \log_{10} \frac{D}{d}.$$
- Attenuation (loss) per unit length, in decibels per metre. This is dependent on the loss in the dielectric material filling the cable and resistive losses in the centre conductor and outer shield. These losses are frequency-dependent, becoming higher as the frequency increases. Skin-effect losses in the conductors can be reduced by increasing the diameter of the cable. A cable with twice the diameter has half the skin effect resistance. Ignoring dielectric and other losses, the larger cable would halve the dB/m loss. In designing a system, engineers consider not only the loss in the cable but also the loss in the connectors.
- Velocity of propagation, in metres per second. The velocity of propagation depends on the dielectric constant and permeability (which is usually 1):
  $$v = \frac{1}{\sqrt{\epsilon \mu}} = \frac{c}{\sqrt{\epsilon_\text{r} \mu_\text{r}}}.$$
- Single-mode band. In coaxial cable, the dominant mode (the mode with the lowest cutoff frequency) is the TEM mode, which has a cutoff frequency of zero; it propagates all the way down to DC. The mode with the next lowest cutoff is the TE_{11} mode. This mode has one "wave" (two reversals of polarity) in going around the circumference of the cable. To a good approximation, the condition for the TE_{11} mode to propagate is that the wavelength in the dielectric is no longer than the average circumference of the insulator; that is that the frequency is at least
  $$f_\text{c} \approx \frac{1}{\pi \left(\frac{D + d}{2}\right) \sqrt{\mu \epsilon}} =
\frac{c}{\pi \left(\frac{D + d}{2}\right) \sqrt{\mu_\text{r} \epsilon_\text{r}}}.$$
  Hence, the cable is single-mode from DC up to this frequency and might in practice be used up to 90% of this frequency.
- Peak voltage. The peak voltage is set by the breakdown voltage of the insulator:
  $$V_\text{p} = E_\text{d} \frac{d}{2} \ln \frac{D}{d},$$
  where V_{p} is the peak voltage, E_{d} is the insulator breakdown voltage in volts per metre, d is the inner diameter in metres, D is the outer diameter in metres. The calculated peak voltage is often reduced by a safety factor.

=== Choice of impedance ===
The best coaxial cable impedances were experimentally determined at Bell Laboratories in 1929 to be 77 Ω for low-attenuation, 60 Ω for high-voltage, and 30 Ω for high-power. For a coaxial cable with air dielectric and a shield of a given inner diameter, the attenuation is minimized by choosing the diameter of the inner conductor to give a characteristic impedance of 76.7 Ω. When more common dielectrics are considered, the lowest insertion loss impedance drops down to a value between 52 and 64 Ω. Maximum power handling is achieved at 30 Ω.

The approximate impedance required to match a centre-fed dipole antenna in free space (i.e., a dipole without ground reflections) is 73 Ω, so 75 Ω coax was commonly used for connecting shortwave antennas to receivers. These typically involve such low levels of RF power that power-handling and high-voltage breakdown characteristics are unimportant when compared to attenuation. Likewise with CATV, although many broadcast TV installations and CATV headends use 300 Ω folded dipole antennas to receive off-the-air signals, 75 Ω coax makes a convenient 4:1 balun transformer for these as well as possessing low attenuation.

The arithmetic mean between 30 Ω and 77 Ω is 53.5 Ω; the geometric mean is 48 Ω. The selection of 50 Ω as a compromise between power-handling capability and attenuation is in general cited as the reason for the number. 50 Ω also works out tolerably well because it corresponds approximately to the feedpoint impedance of a half-wave dipole, mounted approximately a half-wave above "normal" ground (ideally 73 Ω, but reduced for low-hanging horizontal wires).

RG-62 is a 93 Ω coaxial cable originally used in mainframe computer networks in the 1970s and early 1980s (it was the cable used to connect IBM 3270 terminals to IBM 3274/3174 terminal cluster controllers). Later, some manufacturers of LAN equipment, such as Datapoint for ARCNET, adopted RG-62 as their coaxial cable standard. The cable has the lowest capacitance per unit-length when compared to other coaxial cables of similar size.

All of the components of a coaxial system should have the same impedance to avoid internal reflections at connections between components (see Impedance matching). Such reflections may cause signal attenuation. They introduce standing waves, which increase losses and can even result in cable dielectric breakdown with high-power transmission. In analog video or TV systems, reflections cause ghosting in the image; multiple reflections may cause the original signal to be followed by more than one echo. If a coaxial cable is open (not connected at the end), the termination has nearly infinite resistance, which causes reflections. If the coaxial cable is short-circuited, the termination resistance is nearly zero, which causes reflections with the opposite polarity. Reflections will be nearly eliminated if the coaxial cable is terminated in a pure resistance equal to its impedance.

== Issues ==
=== Signal leakage ===
Signal leakage is the passage of electromagnetic fields through the shield of a cable and occurs in both directions. Ingress is the passage of an outside signal into the cable and can result in noise and disruption of the desired signal. Egress is the passage of signal intended to remain within the cable into the outside world and can result in a weaker signal at the end of the cable and radio frequency interference to nearby devices. Severe leakage usually results from improperly installed connectors or faults in the cable shield.

For example, in the United States, signal leakage from cable television systems is regulated by the FCC, since cable signals use the same frequencies as aeronautical and radionavigation bands. CATV operators may also choose to monitor their networks for leakage to prevent ingress. Outside signals entering the cable can cause unwanted noise and picture ghosting. Excessive noise can overwhelm the signal, making it useless. In-channel ingress can be digitally removed by ingress cancellation.

An ideal shield would be a perfect conductor with no holes, gaps, or bumps connected to a perfect ground. However, a smooth solid highly conductive shield would be heavy, inflexible, and expensive. Such coax is used for straight-line feeds to commercial radio broadcast towers. More economical cables must make compromises between shield efficacy, flexibility, and cost, such as the corrugated surface of flexible hardline, flexible braid, or foil shields. Since shields cannot be perfect conductors, current flowing on the inside of the shield produces an electromagnetic field on the outer surface of the shield.

Consider the skin effect. The magnitude of an alternating current in a conductor decays exponentially with distance beneath the surface, with the depth of penetration being proportional to the square root of the resistivity. This means that, in a shield of finite thickness, some small amount of current will still be flowing on the opposite surface of the conductor. With a perfect conductor (i.e., zero resistivity), all of the current would flow at the surface, with no penetration into and through the conductor. Real cables have a shield made of an imperfect, although usually very good, conductor, so there must always be some leakage.

The gaps or holes, allow some of the electromagnetic field to penetrate to the other side. For example, braided shields have many small gaps. The gaps are smaller when using a foil (solid metal) shield, but there is still a seam running the length of the cable. Foil becomes increasingly rigid with increasing thickness, so a thin foil layer is often surrounded by a layer of braided metal, which offers greater flexibility for a given cross-section.

Signal leakage can be severe if there is poor contact at the interface to connectors at either end of the cable or if there is a break in the shield.

To greatly reduce signal leakage into or out of the cable, by a factor of 1000, or even 10,000, superscreened cables are often used in critical applications, such as for neutron flux counters in nuclear reactors.

Superscreened cables for nuclear use are defined in IEC 96-4-1, 1990, however as there have been long gaps in the construction of nuclear power stations in Europe, many existing installations are using superscreened cables to the UK standard AESS(TRG) 71181 which is referenced in IEC 61917.

=== Ground loops ===
A continuous current, even if small, along the imperfect shield of a coaxial cable can cause visible or audible interference. In CATV systems distributing analog signals the potential difference between the coaxial network and the electrical grounding system of a house can cause a visible "hum bar" in the picture. This appears as a wide horizontal distortion bar in the picture that scrolls slowly upward. Such differences in potential can be reduced by proper bonding to a common ground at the house. See ground loop.

=== Noise ===
External fields create a voltage across the inductance of the outside of the outer conductor between sender and receiver. The effect is less when there are several parallel cables, as this reduces the inductance and, therefore, the voltage. Because the outer conductor carries the reference potential for the signal on the inner conductor, the receiving circuit measures the wrong voltage.

==== Transformer effect ====
The transformer effect is sometimes used to mitigate the effect of currents induced in the shield. The inner and outer conductors form the primary and secondary winding of the transformer, and the effect is enhanced in some high-quality cables that have an outer layer of mu-metal. Because of this 1:1 transformer, the aforementioned voltage across the outer conductor is transformed onto the inner conductor so that the two voltages can be cancelled by the receiver. Many senders and receivers have means to reduce the leakage even further. They increase the transformer effect by passing the whole cable through a ferrite core one or more times.

=== Common mode current and radiation ===
Common mode current occurs when stray currents in the shield flow in the same direction as the current in the centre conductor, causing the coax to radiate. They are the opposite of the desired "push-pull" differential signalling currents, where the signal currents on the inner and outer conductor are equal and opposite.

Most of the shield effect in coax results from opposing currents in the centre conductor and shield creating opposite magnetic fields that cancel, and thus do not radiate. The same effect helps ladder line. However, ladder line is extremely sensitive to surrounding metal objects, which can enter the fields before they completely cancel. Coax does not have this problem, since the field is enclosed in the shield. However, it is still possible for a field to form between the shield and other connected objects, such as the antenna the coax feeds. The current formed by the field between the antenna and the coax shield would flow in the same direction as the current in the centre conductor, and thus not be canceled. Energy would radiate from the coax itself, affecting the radiation pattern of the antenna. With sufficient power, this could be a hazard to people near the cable. A properly placed and properly sized balun can prevent common-mode radiation in coax. An isolating transformer or blocking capacitor can be used to couple a coaxial cable to equipment, where it is desirable to pass radio-frequency signals but to block direct current or low-frequency power.

=== Higher impedance at audio frequencies ===
The characteristic impedance formula above is a good approximation at radio frequencies; however, for frequencies below 100 kHz (such as audio) it becomes important to use the complete telegrapher's equation:
$$Z_0 = \sqrt{ \frac{R + j\omega L}{G + j\omega C} }.$$
Applying this formula to typical 75-ohm coaxial cable gives impedance across the audio spectrum in the range from ~150 Ω to ~5 kΩ, much higher than nominal. The velocity of propagation also decreases considerably. Thus coaxial-cable impedances are consistent at RF frequencies but variable across audio frequencies. This effect was manifested when trying to send a plain voice signal across the transatlantic telegraph cable, with poor results.

== Standards ==
American coaxial cable designations
Designator	Kind	Meaning or use	Example
RG (Note: Radio Guide)	Industry series prefix (Note: RG was originally a U.S. military designation from World War II and were listed in MIL-HDBK-216 published in 1962. The standard was superseded by the M17 designation.)	There is no standard to guarantee the electrical and physical characteristics of a cable described as "RG-# type". The RG designators are mostly used to identify compatible connectors that fit the inner conductor, dielectric, and jacket dimensions of the old RG-series cables.	
A	RG suffix element	Indicates a revision of the base RG cable type.	RG-58A
B	RG suffix element	Indicates a revision of the base RG cable type.	RG-58B
C	RG suffix element	Indicates a revision of the base RG cable type.	RG-58C
/U	RG suffix element	Indicates universal or general-use cable in RG-style designations.	RG-58A/U
/UQ	RG suffix element	Indicates a quad-shield version of an RG-style cable.	RG-6/UQ
M17	U.S. military designation	MIL-SPEC MIL-C-17 part-identifying number for military coaxial cables.	M17/75-RG214

Japanese coaxial cable designations
Designator	Kind	Meaning or use	Example
JIS	National designation system		
C (Note: Not the same as the RG designation C)	JIS impedance designation	Indicates 75 Ω coaxial cable.	3C-2V
D	JIS impedance designation	Indicates 50 Ω coaxial cable.	5D-2V
2	JIS dielectric designation	Indicates polyethylene insulation.	3C-2V
F	JIS dielectric designation	Indicates foamed polyethylene insulation.	5C-FB
HF	JIS dielectric designation	Indicates highly expanded polyethylene insulation.	S-5C-HFB
B (Note: Not the same as the RG designation B)	JIS outer-conductor/sheath designation	Indicates double-braided wire with aluminum-foil tape.	5C-FB
V	JIS outer-conductor/sheath designation	Indicates single braid with vinyl sheath.	3C-2V
W	JIS outer-conductor/sheath designation	Indicates double braid with vinyl sheath.	5C-2W
T	JIS outer-conductor/sheath designation	Indicates triple braid with vinyl sheath.	5C-2T

British coaxial cable designations
Designator	Kind	Meaning or use	Example
URM (Note: Uni Radio Metric)	British military designation	Coaxial-cable designation originally designed to British defence standard 61-12 Part 9 and British Standard 2316.	URM67
BT, RA	British Telecom designation	Designation for telephone-exchange interconnections.	BT3002, RA7000
PSF	BBC designation		PSF 1/3

European coaxial cable standard-number elements
Designator	Kind	Meaning or use	Example
EN	European prefix		
50117	European series	European standard series for coaxial cables used in analogue and digital systems.	
-1 (Note: In EN 50117, this is a standard part number, not a cable-construction suffix.)	EN 50117 suffix	Indicates Part 1, the generic specification for coaxial cables.	EN 50117-1
-9-3	EN 50117 suffix	Indicates Part 9-3, a sectional specification for indoor drop coaxial cables for systems operating from 5 MHz to 6,000 MHz.	EN 50117-9-3
-10-2	EN 50117 suffix	Indicates Part 10-2, a sectional specification for outdoor drop coaxial cables for systems operating from 5 MHz to 3,000 MHz.	EN 50117-10-2
-11-1	EN 50117 suffix	Indicates Part 11-1, a sectional specification for distribution and trunk coaxial cables for systems operating from 5 MHz to 1,000 MHz.	EN 50117-11-1
50289	European test-method series	European communication-cable test-method series used with coaxial and other communication cables.	
-1-8	EN 50289 suffix	Indicates Part 1-8, an electrical test-method part for attenuation.	EN 50289-1-8
50575	European CPR fire-performance standard	Standard for power, control, and communication cables used in works subject to reaction-to-fire requirements.	
Aca, B1ca, B2ca, Cca, Dca, Eca, Fca	Euroclass fire-performance suffixes	Reaction-to-fire classes for cables under EN 50575 and the Construction Products Regulation.	
s, d, a	Euroclass additional classifications	Additional CPR classifications for smoke production, flaming droplets, and acidity.	B2ca-s1,d1,a1

Dielectric material codes and velocity factors
Code (Note: Dielectric material codes are taken from RF Cafe.)	Dielectric material	Typical velocity factor (VF) (Note: VF is the velocity factor; it is determined by the effective $\epsilon_\text{r}$ and $\mu_\text{r}$.)
FPE, PF	Foamed polyethylene / polyethylene foam	0.78–0.88
PE	Solid polyethylene	About 0.66
PTFE	Solid polytetrafluoroethylene	About 0.70
—	Foamed PTFE	About 0.84
ASP	Air-space polyethylene	—
—	Air	About 1.00

List of coaxial cables
Type	Impedance (ohms)	Core (mm)	Dielectric				Outside diameter		Shields	Remarks	Max. attenuation, 750 MHz (dB/100 ft)
Type	Impedance (ohms)	Core (mm)	Type	VF	(in)	(mm)	(in)	(mm)	Shields	Remarks	Max. attenuation, 750 MHz (dB/100 ft)
RG-6/U	75	1.024	PF	0.75	0.185	4.7	0.270	6.86	Double	Low loss at high frequency for cable television, satellite television and cable modems	5.65
RG-6/UQ	75	1.024	PF	0.75	0.185	4.7	0.298	7.57	Quad	This is "quad shield RG-6". It has four layers of shielding; regular RG-6 has only one or two	5.65
RG-7	75	1.30	PF		0.225	5.72	0.320	8.13	Double	Low loss at high frequency for cable television, satellite television and cable modems	4.57
RG-8/U	50	2.17	PE		0.285	7.2	0.405	10.3		Amateur radio; Thicknet (10BASE5) is similar	5.97
RG-8X	50	1.47	PF	0.82	0.155	3.9	0.242	6.1	Single	A thinner version, with some of the electrical characteristics of RG-8U in a diameter similar to RG-59.	10.95
RG-9/U	51		PE				0.420	10.7			
RG-11/U	75	1.63	PE	0.66–0.85	0.285	7.2	0.412	10.5	Dual/triple/quad	Low loss at high frequency for cable and satellite television. Used for long drops and underground conduit, similar to RG7 but generally lower loss.	3.65
RG-56/U	48	1.4859					0.308	7.82	Dual braid shielded	Rated to 8000 volts, rubber dielectric	
RG-58/U	50	0.81	PE	0.66	0.116	2.9	0.195	5.0	Single	Used for radiocommunication and amateur radio, thin Ethernet (10BASE2) and NIM electronics, Loss 1.056 dB/m @ 2.4 GHz. Common.	13.10
RG-59/U	75	0.64	PE	0.66	0.146	3.7	0.242	6.1	Single	Used to carry baseband video in closed-circuit television, previously used for cable television. In general, it has poor shielding but will carry an HQ HD signal or video over short distances.	9.71
RG-59A/U	75	0.762	PF	0.78	0.146	3.7	0.242	6.1	Single	Similar physical characteristics as RG-59 and RG-59/U, but with a higher velocity factor. 8.9@700 MHz	8.9
3C-2V	75	0.50	PE	0.85		3.0		5.4	Single	Used to carry television, video observation systems, and other. PVC jacket.	
5C-2V	75	0.80	PE	0.82±0.02	0.181	4.6	0.256	6.5	Double	Used for interior lines for monitoring system, CCTV feeder lines, wiring between the camera and control unit and video signal transmission. PVC jacket.	
RG-60/U	50	1.024	PE				0.425	10.8	Single	Used for high-definition cable TV and high-speed cable Internet.	
RG-62/U	92		PF	0.84			0.242	6.1	Single	Used for ARCNET and automotive radio antennas.	
RG-62A	93		ASP				0.242	6.1	Single	Used for NIM electronics	
RG-63	125	1.2	PE				0.405	10.29	Double braid	Used for aerospace	4.6
RG-142/U	50	0.94	PTFE		0.116	2.95	0.195	4.95	Double braid	Used for test equipment	9.6
RG-174/U	50	0.5 (7×0.16)	PE	0.66	0.059	1.5	0.100	2.55	Single	Common for Wi-Fi pigtails: more flexible but higher loss than RG58; used with LEMO 00 connectors in NIM electronics.	23.57
RG-178/U	50	0.31 (7×0.1)	PTFE	0.69	0.033	0.84	0.071	1.8	Single	Used for high-frequency signal transmission. 42.7 @ 900 MHz,	
RG-179/U	75	0.31 (7×0.1)	PTFE	0.67	0.063	1.6	0.098	2.5	Single	VGA RGBHV, core material: Ag-plated Cu	
RG-180B/U	95	0.31	PTFE		0.102	2.59	0.145	3.68	Single silver-covered copper	VGA RGBHV, core material: Ag-plated Cu-clad steel	
RG-188A/U	50	0.5 (7×0.16)	PTFE	0.70	0.06	1.52	0.1	2.54	Single	26.2 @ 1000 MHz, Core material: Ag-plated Cu-clad steel	26.2
RG-195	95	0.305	PTFE		0.102	2.59	0.145	3.68	Single	PTFE jacket suitable for direct burial, Core material: Ag-plated Cu-clad steel	
RG-213/U	50	2.26 (7×0.75)	PE	0.66	0.285	7.2	0.405	10.3	Single	For radiocommunication and amateur radio, EMC test antenna cables. Typically lower loss than RG58. Common.	5.98
RG-214/U	50	2.26 (7×0.75)	PE	0.66	0.285	7.2	0.425	10.8	Double	Used for high-frequency signal transmission.	6.7
RG-218	50	4.963	PE	0.66	0.660 (0.680?)	16.76 (17.27?)	0.870	22	Single	Large diameter, not very flexible, low-loss (2.5 dB/100 ft @ 400 MHz), 11 kV dielectric withstand.	2.83
RG-223/U	50	0.88	PE	0.66	0.0815	2.07	0.212	5.4	Double	Silver-plated shields. Sample RG-223 Datasheet	11.46
RG-316/U	50	0.51 (7×0.17)	PTFE	0.69	0.060	1.5	0.098	2.6	Single	Used with LEMO 00 connectors in NIM electronics	22.45
RG-400/U	50	1.0 (19×0.20)	PTFE			2.95		4.95	Double		12.57
RG-402/U	50	0.93	PTFE			3.0	0.141	3.58	Single silver-plated copper	Semi-rigid, 0.91 dB/m@5 GHz	27.7
RG-405/U	50	0.51	PTFE			1.68	0.0865	2.20	Single silver-plated copper-clad steel	Semi-rigid, 1.51 dB/m@5 GHz	46.0
H155	50	1.41 (19×0.28)	PF	0.79	0.0984	2.5	0.2126	5.4	Double	Lower loss at high frequency for radiocommunication and amateur radio	
H500	50	2.5	PF	0.81	0.1772	4.5	0.386	9.8	Double	Low loss at high frequency for radiocommunication and amateur radio, 4.45 @ 1000 MHz	4.45
UT-141	50	0.92	PTFE	0.70	0.1175	2.98	0.141	3.58	Single	SHF Interconnect	8.6
LMR-100	50	0.46	PE	0.66	0.0417	1.06	0.110	2.79	Double	Low loss communications, 1.36 dB/metre @ 2.4 GHz	20.7
LMR-195	50	0.94	PF	0.80	0.073	1.85	0.195	4.95	Double	Low loss communications, 0.620 dB/metre @ 2.4 GHz	10.1
LMR-200 HDF-200 CFD-200	50	1.12	PF	0.83	0.116	2.95	0.195	4.95	Double	Low-loss communications, 0.554 dB/metre @ 2.4 GHz	9.0
LMR-240 EMR-240	50	1.42	PF	0.84	0.150	3.81	0.240	6.1	Double	Amateur radio, low-loss replacement for RG-8X	6.9
LMR-300	50	1.78	PF	0.82	0.190	4.83	0.300	7.62	Foil, braid	Low-loss communications	5.5
LMR-400 HDF-400 CFD-400 EMR-400	50	2.74	PF	0.85	0.285	7.24	0.405	10.29	Double	Low-loss communications, 0.223 dB/metre @ 2.4 GHz, Core material: Cu-clad Al	3.5
LMR-500	50	3.61	PF	0.86	0.370	9.4	0.500	12.7	Double	Low-loss communications, Core material: Cu-clad Al	2.8
LMR-600	50	4.47	PF	0.87	0.455	11.56	0.590	14.99	Double	Low-loss communications, 0.144 dB/metre @ 2.4 GHz, Core material: Cu-clad Al	2.3
LMR-900	50	6.65	PF	0.87	0.680	17.27	0.870	22.10	Double	Low-loss communications, 0.098 dB/metre @ 2.4 GHz, Core material: BC tube	1.5
LMR-1200	50	8.86	PF	0.88	0.920	23.37	1.200	30.48	Double	Low-loss communications, 0.075 dB/metre @ 2.4 GHz, Core material: BC tube	1.3
LMR-1700	50	13.39	PF	0.89	1.350	34.29	1.670	42.42	Double	Low-loss communications, 0.056 dB/metre @ 2.4 GHz, Core material: BC tube	0.8
LDF4-50A	50	4.83	FPE	0.88	0.51	12.96	0.55	13.97	Corrugated copper	Heliax Cellflex low-loss semi-flexible	1.90
AVA5-50	50	9.45	FPE	0.88	0.95	24.1	1.000	25.4	Corrugated copper	Heliax Cellflex low-loss semi-flexible	0.98
AVA7-50	50	18.6	FPE	0.92	1.75	44.5	1.825	46.4	Corrugated copper	Heliax Cellflex low-loss semi-flexible	0.58
HCA214-50J	50	22.7	Air	0.95	1.96	49.9	2.37	60.2	Corrugated copper	Semi-flexible hardline	0.50
HCA300-50J	50	29.3	Air	0.96	2.50	63.5	2.99	76.0	Corrugated copper	Semi-flexible hardline	0.39
HCA400-50J	50	34.8	Air	0.96	2.96	75.3	3.56	90.5	Corrugated copper	Semi-flexible hardline	0.33
HCA495-50J	50	45.0	Air	0.97	3.86	98.1	4.53	115.1	Corrugated copper	Semi-flexible hardline	0.25
HCA550-50J	50	58.0	Air	0.96	5.00	127.1	5.79	147.1	Corrugated copper	Semi-flexible hardline	0.20
HCA618-50J	50	67.0	Air	0.97	5.78	147.0	6.65	169	Corrugated copper	Semi-flexible hardline	0.17
HCA800-50J	50	88.5	Air	0.97	7.67	195.0	8.78	223.0	Corrugated copper	Semi-flexible hardline	650 MHz max.
HCA900-50T	50	99.4	Air	0.98	8.53	216.7	9.75	247.7	Corrugated aluminium	Semi-flexible hardline	560 MHz max.
QR-320	75	1.80	PF		0.395	10.03			Single	Low-loss line, which replaced RG-11 in most applications	3.34
QR-540	75	3.15	PF		0.610	15.49			Single	Low-loss hard line	1.85
QR-715	75	4.22	PF		0.785	19.94			Single	Low-loss hard line	1.49
QR-860	75	5.16	PF		0.960	24.38			Single	Low-loss hard line	1.24
QR-1125	75	6.68	PF		1.225	31.12			Single	Low-loss hard line	1.01
Type	Impedance (ohms)	Core (mm)	Dielectric				Outside diameter		Shields	Remarks	Max. attenuation, 750 MHz (dB/100 ft)
Type	Impedance (ohms)	Core (mm)	Type	VF	(in)	(mm)	(in)	(mm)	Shields	Remarks	Max. attenuation, 750 MHz (dB/100 ft)

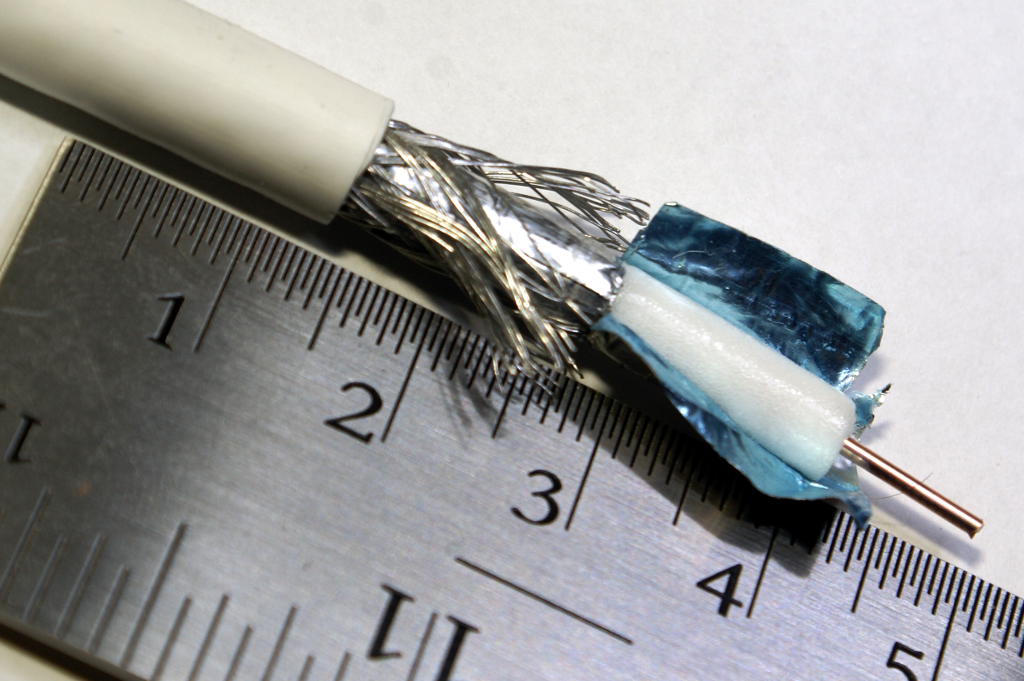
RG-6 coaxial cable

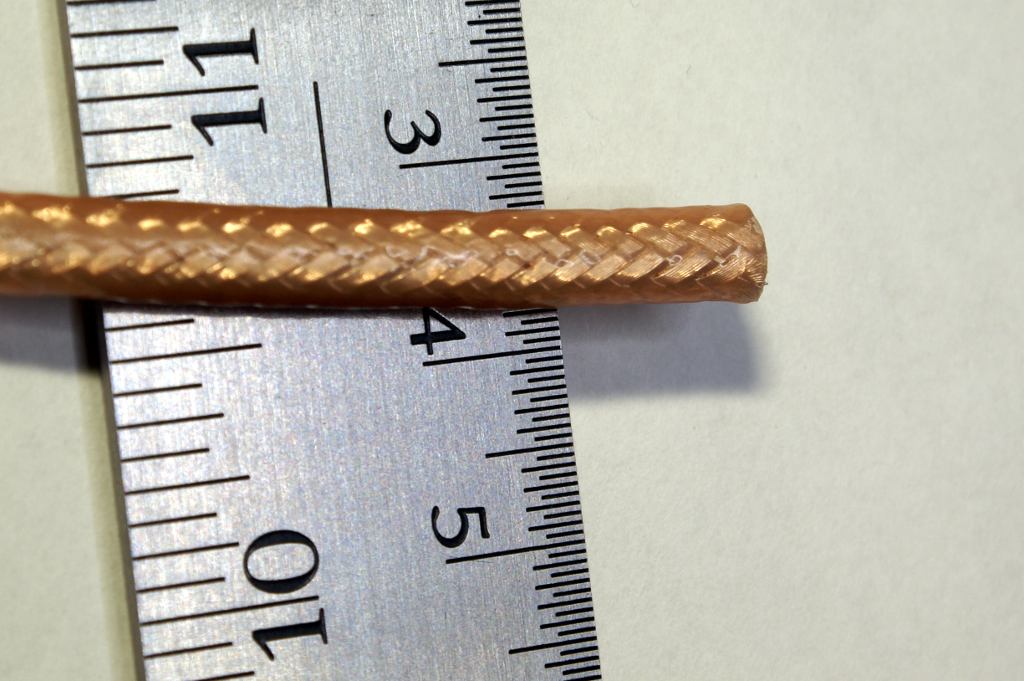
RG-142 coaxial cable

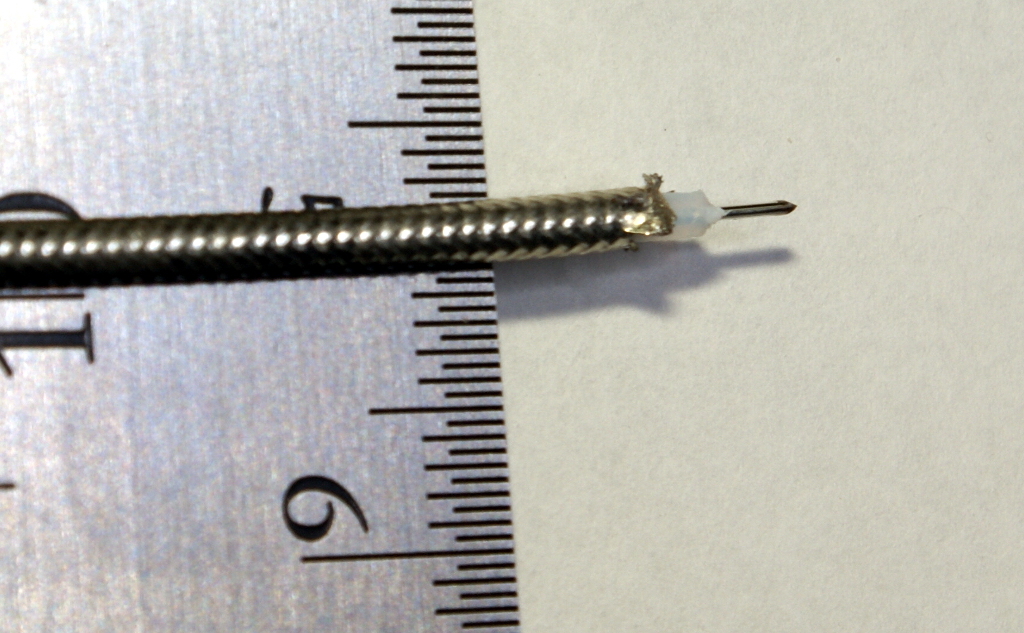
RG-405 semi-rigid coaxial cable

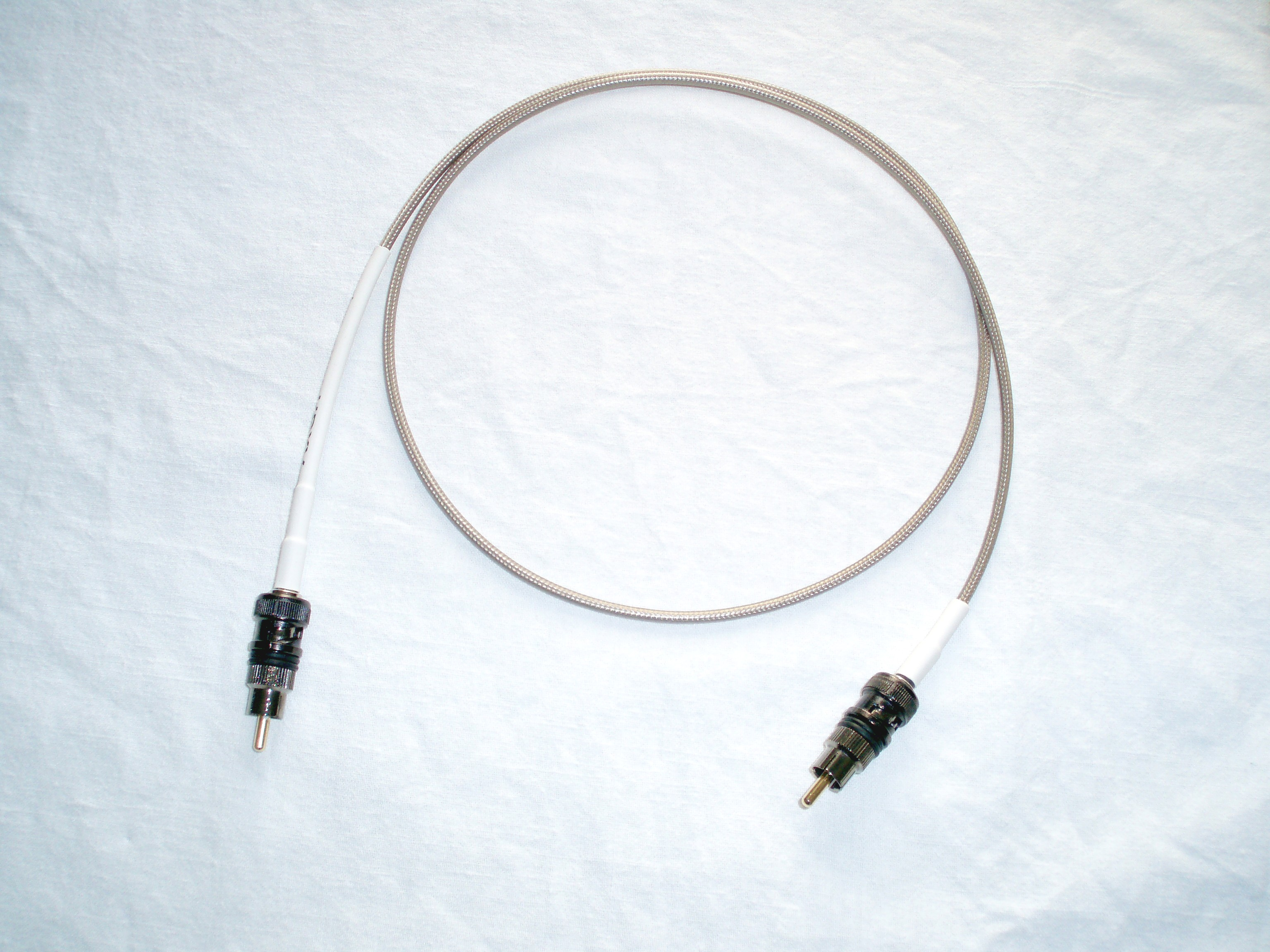
High-end coaxial audio cable (S/PDIF)

== Uses ==
Short coaxial cables are commonly used to connect home video equipment, in ham radio setups, and in Nuclear Instrumentation Modules. While formerly common for implementing computer networks, in particular Ethernet ("thick" 10BASE5 and "thin" 10BASE2), twisted pair cables have replaced them in most applications except in the consumer cable modem market for broadband Internet access.

Long distance coaxial cable was used in the 20th century to connect radio networks, television networks, and long-distance telephone networks though this has largely been superseded by later methods (fibre optics, T1/E1, satellite).

Shorter coaxials still carry cable television signals to the majority of television receivers, and this purpose consumes the majority of coaxial cable production. In 1980s and early 1990s coaxial cable was also used in computer networking, most prominently in Ethernet networks, where it was later in late 1990s to early 2000s replaced by UTP cables in North America and STP cables in Western Europe, both with 8P8C modular connectors.

Micro coaxial cables are used in a range of consumer devices, military equipment, and also in ultrasound scanning equipment.

The most common impedances that are widely used are 50 or 52 ohms and 75 ohms, although other impedances are available for specific applications. The 50 / 52 ohm cables are widely used for industrial and commercial two-way radio frequency applications (including radio, and telecommunications), although 75 ohms is commonly used for broadcast television and radio.

Coaxial cable is often used to carry signals from an antenna to a receiver. In many cases, the same cable carries power toward the antenna, to power a preamplifier. In some cases, a single cable carries unidirectional power and bidirectional data/signals, as in DiSEqC.

== Types ==
=== Hard line ===
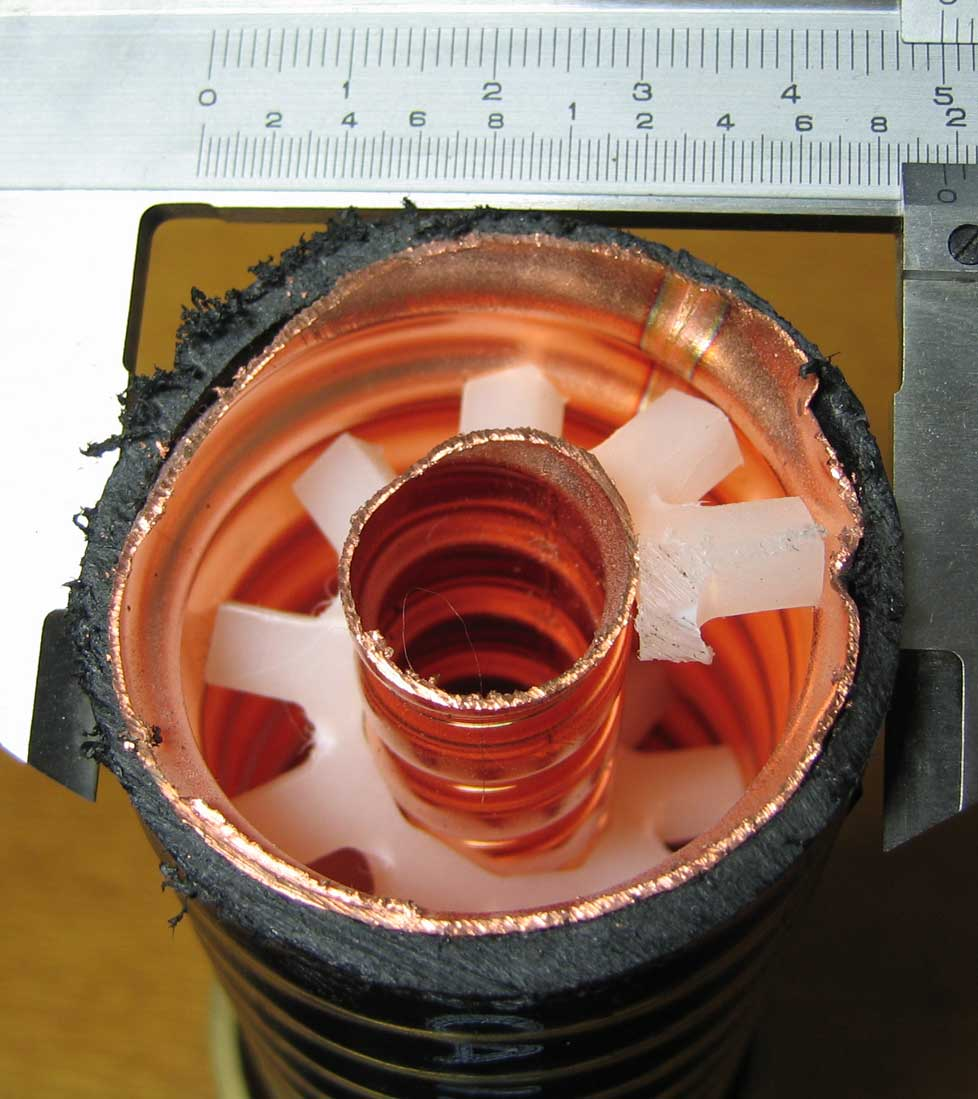
1 5/8 in (41 mm) flexible line with (mostly) air dielectric

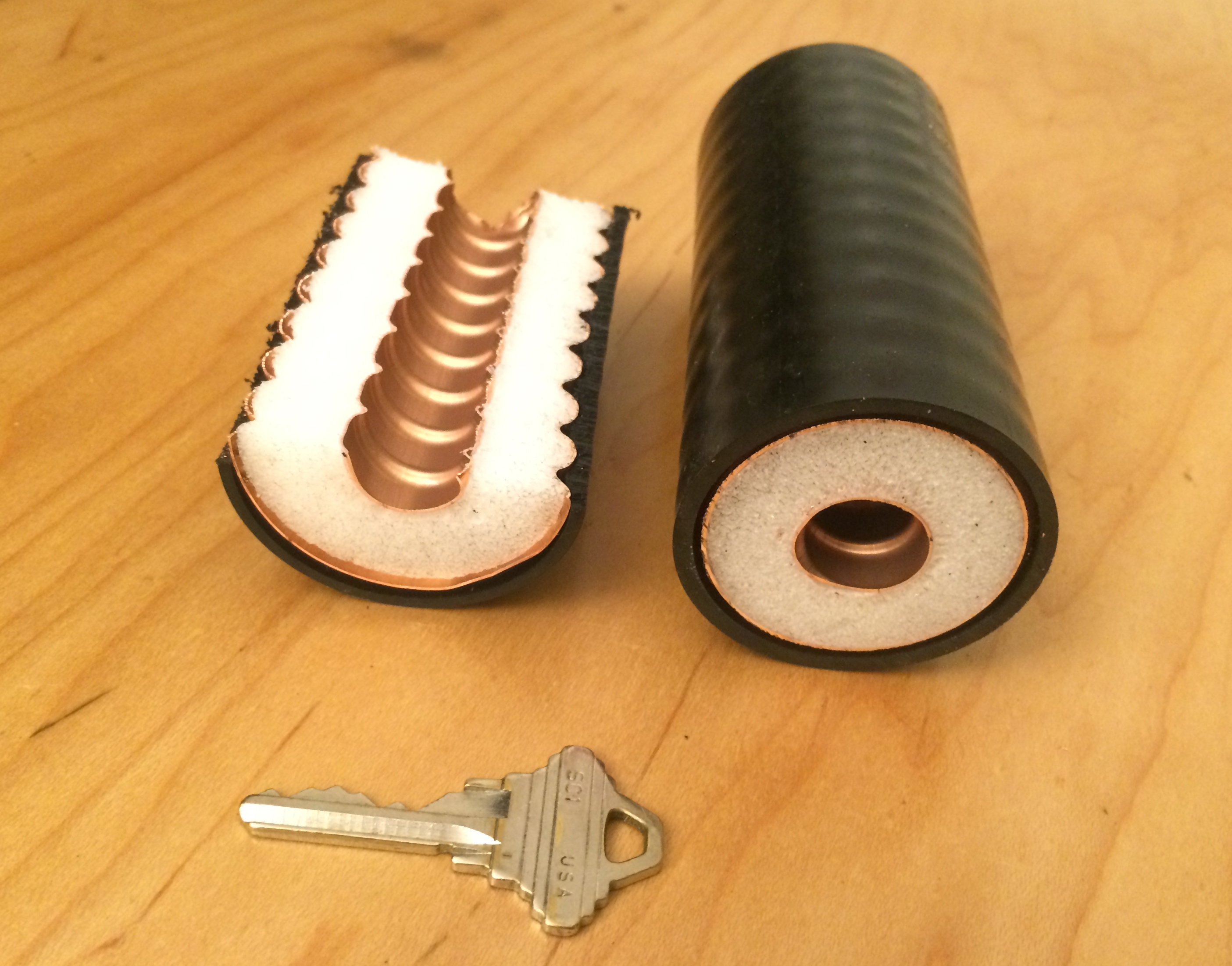
1 5/8 in (41 mm) Heliax coaxial cable with FPE foamed polyethylene dielectric

Larger varieties of hardline may have a centre conductor that is constructed from either rigid or corrugated copper tubing. The dielectric in hard line may consist of polyethylene foam, air, or a pressurized gas such as nitrogen or desiccated air (dried air). In gas-charged lines, hard plastics such as nylon are used as spacers to separate the inner and outer conductors. The addition of these gases into the dielectric space reduces moisture contamination, provides a stable dielectric constant, and provides a reduced risk of internal arcing. Gas-filled hardlines are usually used on high-power RF transmitters such as television or radio broadcasting, military transmitters, and high-power amateur radio applications but may also be used on some critical lower-power applications such as those in the microwave bands. However, in the microwave region, waveguide is more often used than hard line for transmitter-to-antenna, or antenna-to-receiver applications. The various shields used in hard line also differ; some forms use rigid tubing, or pipe, while others may use a corrugated tubing, which makes bending easier, as well as reduces kinking when the cable is bent to conform. Smaller varieties of hard line may be used internally in some high-frequency applications, in particular in equipment within the microwave range, to reduce interference between stages of the device.

=== Radiating ===
Radiating or leaky cable is another form of coaxial cable which is constructed in a similar fashion to hard line, however it is constructed with tuned slots cut into the shield. These slots are tuned to the specific RF wavelength of operation or tuned to a specific radio frequency band. This type of cable is to provide a tuned bi-directional "desired" leakage effect between transmitter and receiver. It is often used in elevator shafts, US Navy Ships, underground transportation tunnels and in other areas where an antenna is not feasible. One example of this type of cable is Radiax (CommScope).

=== RG-6 ===
RG-6 is available in four different types designed for various applications. In addition, the core may be copper clad steel (CCS) or bare solid copper (BC). "Plain" or "house" RG-6 is designed for indoor or external house wiring. "Flooded" cable is infused with water-blocking gel for use in underground conduit or direct burial. "Messenger" may contain some waterproofing but is distinguished by the addition of a steel messenger wire along its length to carry the tension involved in an aerial drop from a utility pole. "Plenum" cabling is expensive and comes with a special Teflon-based outer jacket designed for use in ventilation ducts to meet fire codes. It was developed since the plastics used as the outer jacket and inner insulation in many "Plain" or "house" cabling gives off poisonous gas when burned.

=== Triaxial cable ===
Triaxial cable or triax is coaxial cable with a third layer of shielding, insulation and sheathing. The outer shield, which is earthed (grounded), protects the inner shield from electromagnetic interference from outside sources.

=== Semi-rigid ===
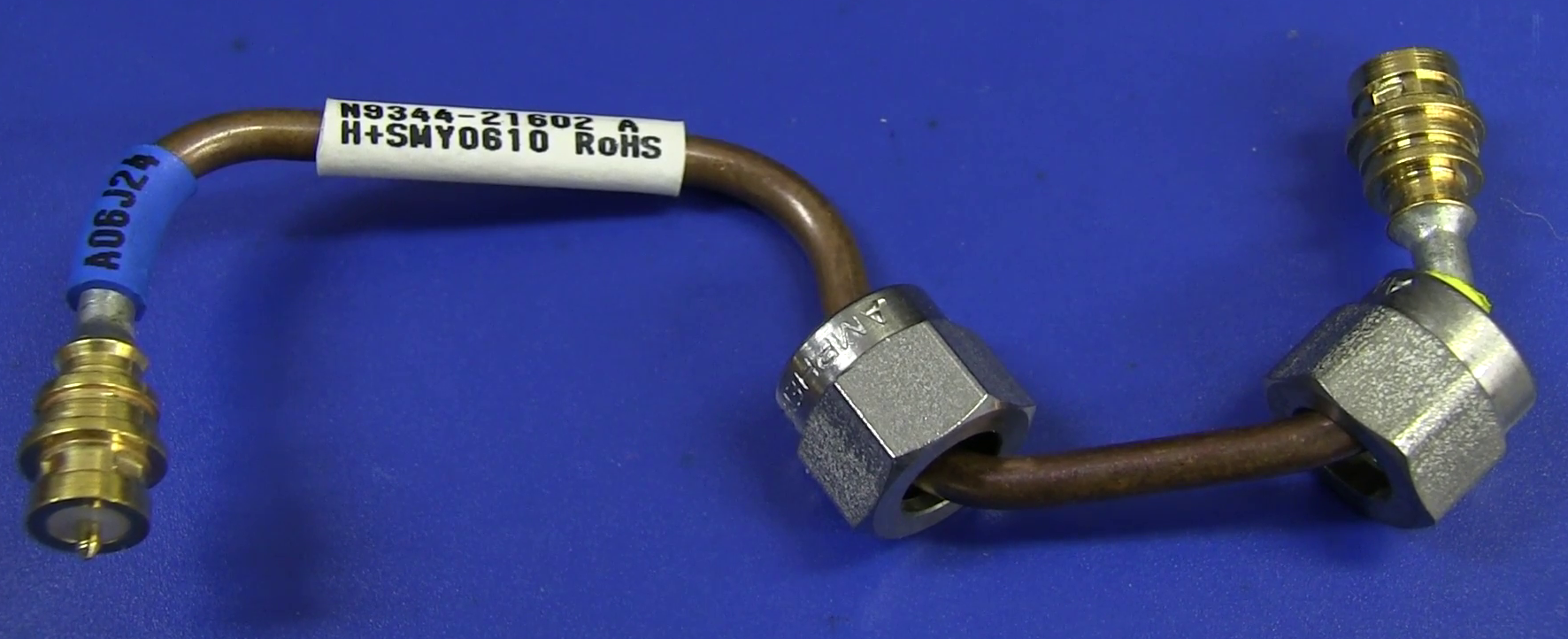
Semi-rigid coax assembly

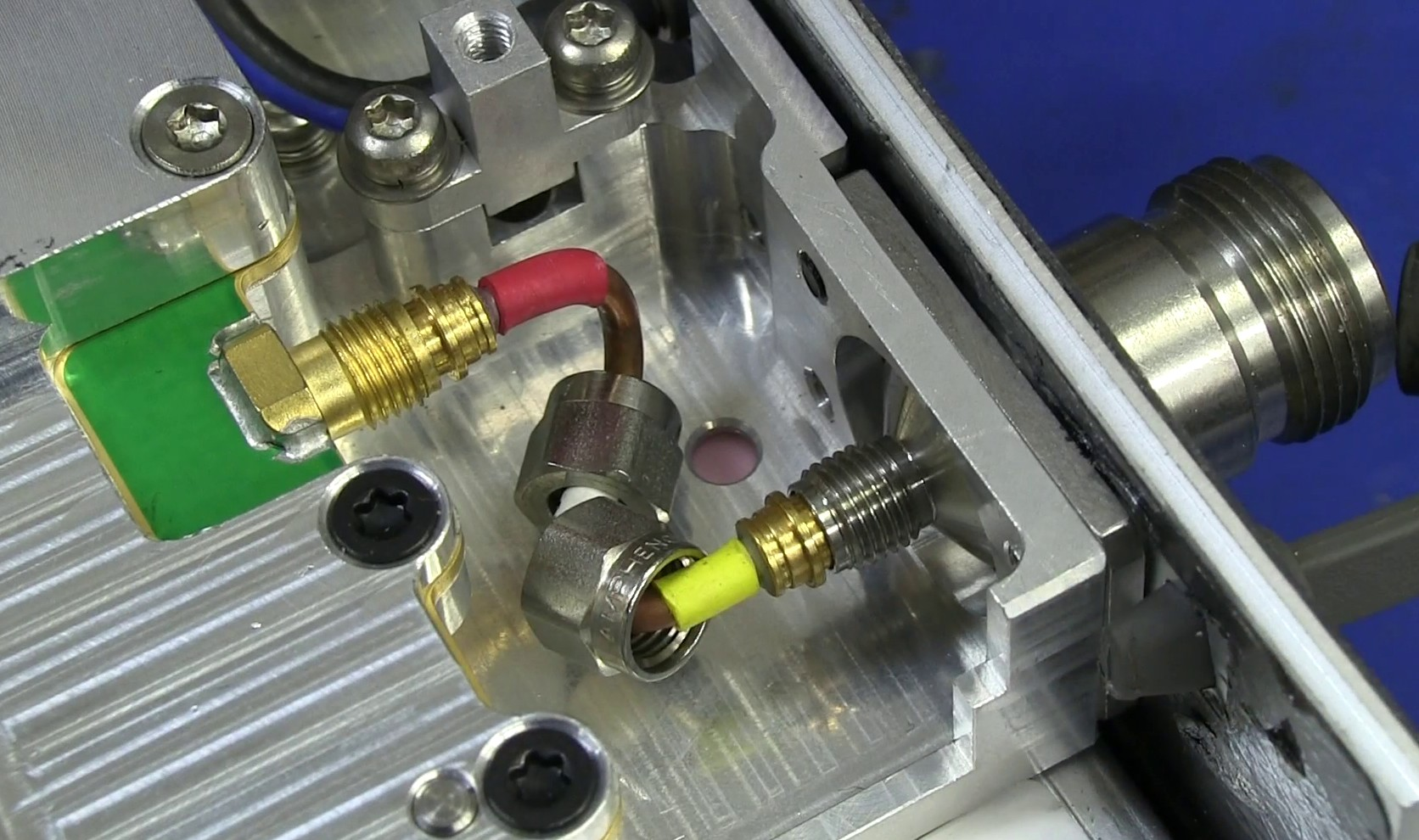
Semi-rigid coax installed in an Agilent N9344C 20GHz spectrum analyser

Semi-rigid cable is a coaxial form using a solid copper outer sheath. This type of coax offers superior screening compared to cables with a braided outer conductor, especially at higher frequencies. The major disadvantage is that the cable, as its name implies, is not very flexible, and is not intended to be flexed after initial forming. (See § Hard line)

Conformable cable is a flexible reformable alternative to semi-rigid coaxial cable used where flexibility is required. Conformable cable can be stripped and formed by hand without the need for specialized tools, similar to standard coaxial cable.

=== Rigid line ===
Rigid line is a coaxial line formed by two copper tubes maintained concentric every other metre using PTFE-supports. Rigid lines cannot be bent, so they often need elbows. Interconnection with rigid line is done with an inner bullet/inner support and a flange or connection kit. Typically, rigid lines are connected using standardised EIA RF Connectors whose bullet and flange sizes match the standard line diameters. For each outer diameter, either 75 or 50 ohm inner tubes can be obtained. Rigid line is commonly used indoors for interconnection between high-power transmitters and other RF-components, but more rugged rigid line with weatherproof flanges is used outdoors on antenna masts, etc. In the interests of saving weight and costs, on masts and similar structures the outer line is often aluminium, and special care must be taken to prevent corrosion. With a flange connector, it is also possible to go from rigid line to hard line. Many broadcasting antennas and antenna splitters use the flanged rigid line interface even when connecting to flexible coaxial cables and hard line. Rigid line is produced in a number of different sizes:

Size	Outer conductor		Inner conductor	
Size	Outer diameter (not flanged)	Inner diameter	Outer diameter	Inner diameter
7/8"	22.2 mm	20 mm	8.7 mm	7.4 mm
1 5/8"	41.3 mm	38.8 mm	16.9 mm	15.0 mm
3 1/8"	79.4 mm	76.9 mm	33.4 mm	31.3 mm
4 1/2"	106 mm	103 mm	44.8 mm	42.8 mm
6 1/8"	155.6 mm	151.9 mm	66.0 mm	64.0 mm

== Interference and troubleshooting ==
Coaxial cable insulation may degrade, requiring replacement of the cable, especially if it has been exposed to the elements on a continuous basis. The shield is normally grounded, and if even a single thread of the braid or filament of foil touches the centre conductor, the signal will be shorted causing significant or total signal loss. This most often occurs at improperly installed end connectors and splices. Also, the connector or splice must be properly attached to the shield, as this provides the path to ground for the interfering signal.

Despite being shielded, interference can occur on coaxial cable lines. Susceptibility to interference has little relationship to broad cable type designations (e.g. RG-59, RG-6) but is strongly related to the composition and configuration of the cable's shielding. For cable television, with frequencies extending well into the UHF range, a foil shield is normally provided, and will provide total coverage as well as high effectiveness against high-frequency interference. Foil shielding is ordinarily accompanied by a tinned copper or aluminium braid shield, with anywhere from 60 to 95% coverage. The braid is important to shield effectiveness because (1) it is more effective than foil at preventing low-frequency interference, (2) it provides higher conductivity to ground than foil, and (3) it makes attaching a connector easier and more reliable. "Quad-shield" cable, using two low-coverage aluminium braid shields and two layers of foil, is often used in situations involving troublesome interference, but is less effective than a single layer of foil and single high-coverage copper braid shield such as is found on broadcast-quality precision video cable.

In the United States and some other countries, cable television distribution systems use extensive networks of outdoor coaxial cable, often with in-line distribution amplifiers. Leakage of signals into and out of cable TV systems can cause interference to cable subscribers and to over-the-air radio services using the same frequencies as those of the cable system.

== History ==
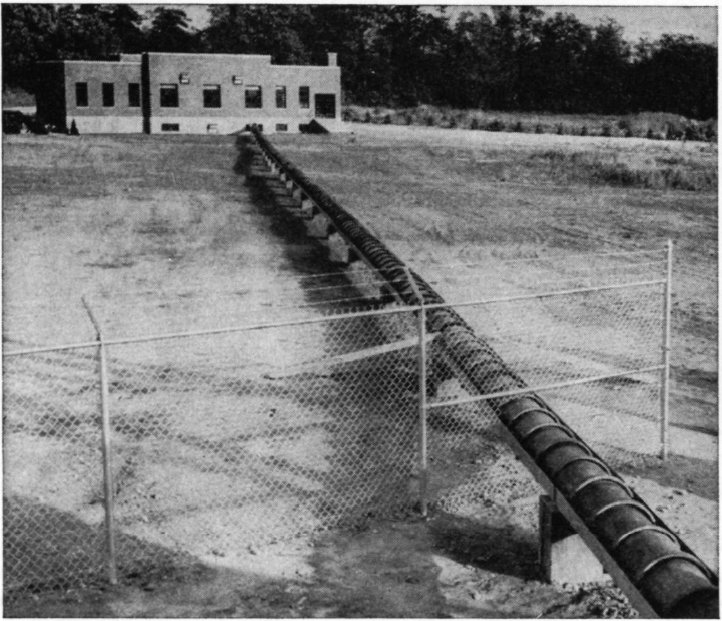
Early coaxial antenna feedline of 50 kW radio station WNBC, New York, 1930s

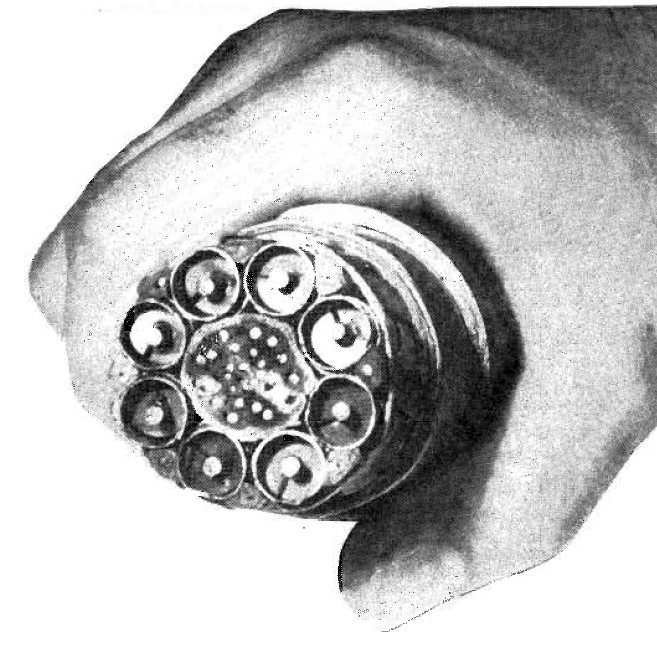
AT&T coaxial cable trunkline installed between East Coast and Midwest in 1948. Each of the 8 coaxial subcables could carry 480 telephone calls or one television channel.

- 1858 — Coaxial cable used in first (1858) transatlantic cable.
- 1880 — Coaxial cable patented in England by Oliver Heaviside, patent no. 1,407.
- 1884 — Siemens & Halske patent coaxial cable in Germany (Patent No. 28,978, 27 March 1884).
- 1894 — Nikola Tesla (U.S. Patent 514,167)
- 1929 — First modern coaxial cable patented by Lloyd Espenschied and Herman Affel of AT&T's Bell Telephone Laboratories.
- 1936 — First closed circuit transmission of TV pictures on coaxial cable, from the 1936 Summer Olympics in Berlin to Leipzig.
- 1936 — Underwater coaxial cable installed between Apollo Bay, near Melbourne, Australia, and Stanley, Tasmania. The 300 km (190 mi) cable can carry one 8.5-kHz broadcast channel and seven telephone channels.
- 1936 — AT&T installs experimental coaxial telephone and television cable between New York and Philadelphia, with automatic booster stations every ten miles (16 km). Completed in December, it can transmit 240 telephone calls simultaneously.
- 1936 — Coaxial cable laid by the General Post Office (now BT) between London and Birmingham, providing 40 telephone channels.
- 1941 — First commercial use in US by AT&T, between Minneapolis, Minnesota and Stevens Point, Wisconsin. L1 system with capacity of one TV channel or 480 telephone circuits.
- 1949 — On January 11, eight stations on the US East Coast and seven Midwestern stations are linked via a long-distance coaxial cable.
- 1956 — First transatlantic telephone coaxial cable laid, TAT-1.
- 1962 — 960 km (600 mi) Sydney–Melbourne co-axial cable commissioned, carrying 3 x 1,260 simultaneous telephone connections, and-or simultaneous inter-city television transmission.

== See also ==
- Balanced line
- BNC connector
- LEMO connector
- Radio frequency power transmission
- Twinaxial cabling
