= RG-6 =

Type of coaxial cable

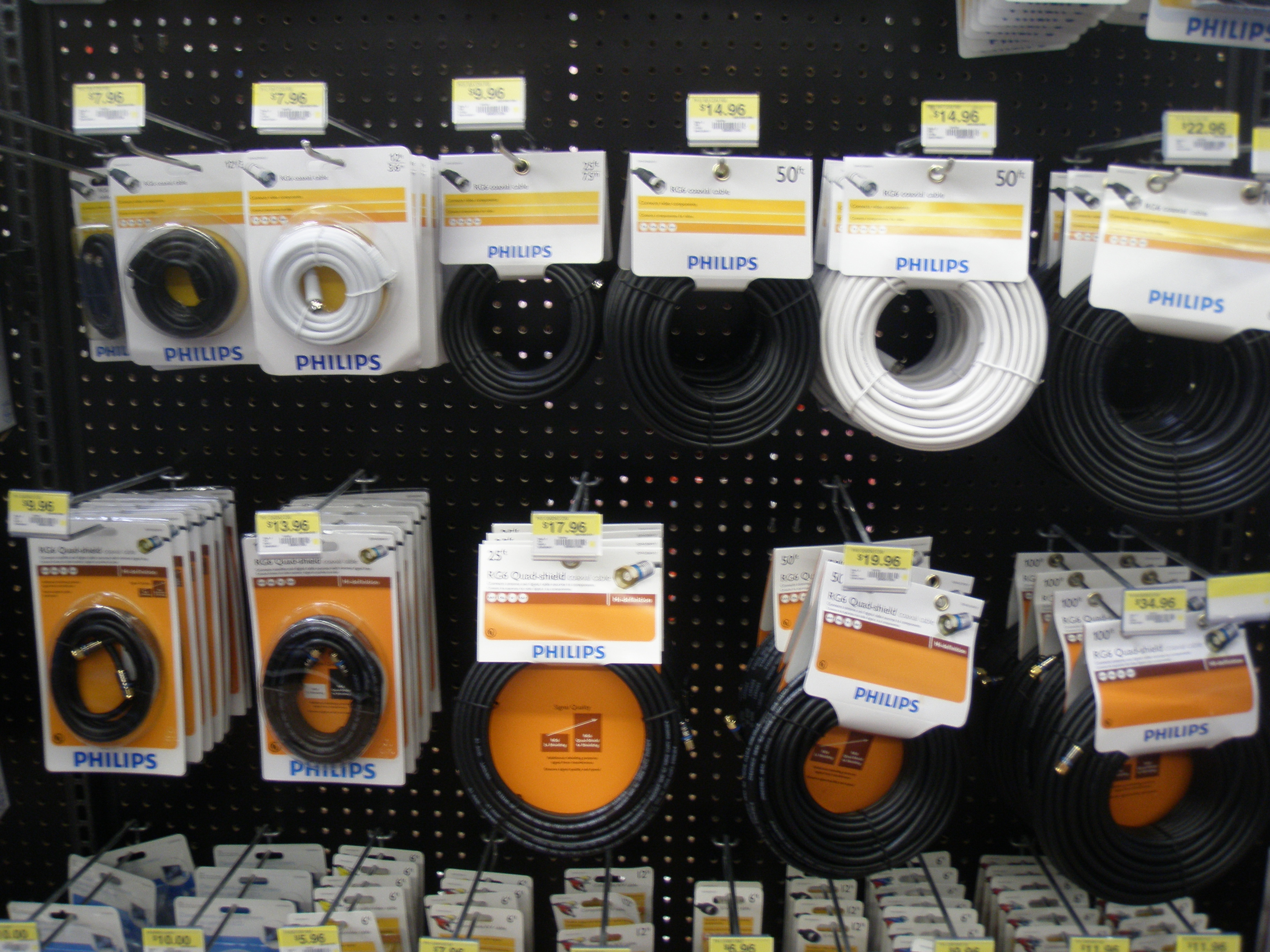
RG-6 coaxial cable for television signals

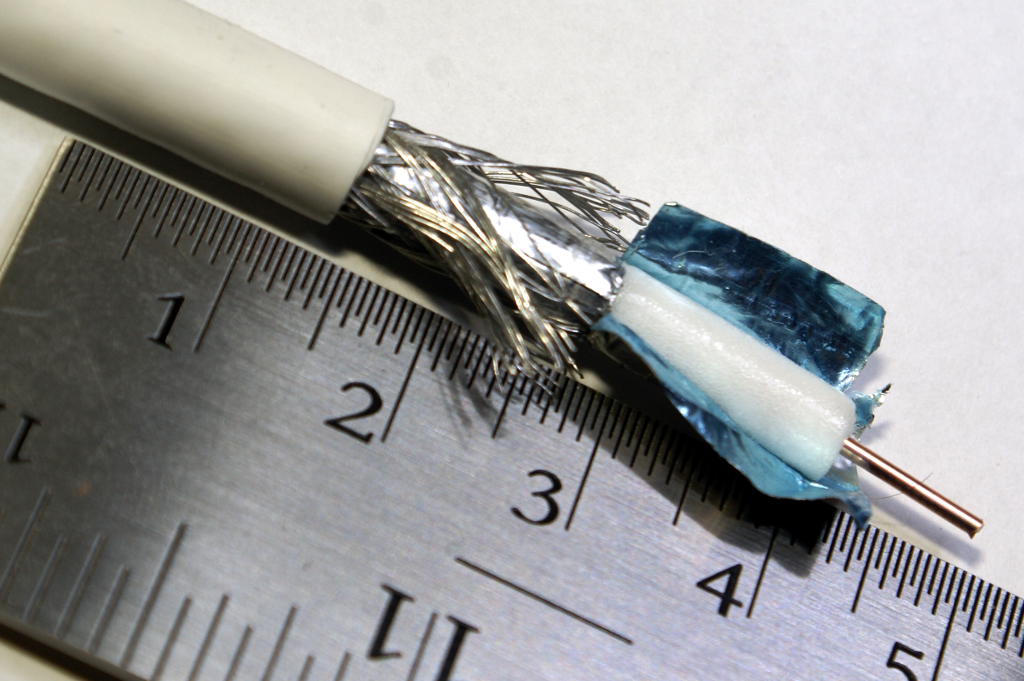
RG-6 coaxial cable

RG-6/U is a common type of coaxial cable used in a wide variety of residential and commercial applications. An RG-6/U coaxial cable has a characteristic impedance of 75 ohms. The term, RG-6, is generic and is applied to a wide variety of cable designs, which differ from one another in shielding characteristics, center conductor composition, dielectric type and jacket type. RG was originally a unit indicator for bulk radio frequency (RF) cable in the U.S. military's Joint Electronics Type Designation System. The suffix /U means for general utility use. The number was assigned sequentially. The RG unit indicator is no longer part of the JETDS system (MIL-STD-196E) and cable sold today under the RG-6 label is unlikely to meet military specifications. In practice, the term RG-6 is generally used to refer to coaxial cables with an 18 AWG (American wire gauge, 1.024 mm) center conductor and 75 ohm characteristic impedance.

== Applications ==
A common type of 75 ohm coaxial cable is cable television (CATV) distribution coax, used to route cable television signals to and within homes. CATV distribution coax typically has a copper-clad steel (CCS) center conductor and a combination aluminum foil/aluminum braid shield, typically with low coverage (about 60%). 75 ohm cables are also used in professional video applications, carrying either base band analog video signals or serial digital interface (SDI) signals; in these applications, the center conductor is ordinarily solid copper, the shielding is much heavier (typically aluminum foil, and 95% copper braid), and tolerances are more tightly controlled, to improve impedance stability.

Cables typically have connectors at each end.

For runs over 150–300 ft (46–91 m), RG-11 cable may be used to avoid signal degradation.

== Types ==
Like most cables, RG-6-style cables are available in several different types designed for various applications, including:

Plain or house wire is designed for indoor or external house wiring.

"Flooded" cable is infused with water blocking gel for use in underground conduit or direct burial.

Messenger or aerial may contain some waterproofing but is distinguished by the addition of a steel messenger wire along its length to carry the tension involved in an aerial drop from a utility pole.

Plenum wire comes with a Low Smoke Zero Halogen (LSZH) jacket that burns but does not produce toxic smoke. LSZH is typically irradiated PVC. Heating drives off volatiles that leaves the resulting product more heat resistant.

== Attenuation/signal loss ==
Cables attenuate a signal in direct proportion to length. Attenuation increases with frequency due to skin effect.

RG-6 attenuation/signal loss
Frequency (MHz)	Attenuation (dB/100 ft)
1	0.2; 0.4 for CCS
10	0.6
100	2.0
1,000	6.2
