= Plenum cable =

Electrical cable for use in plenum spaces

Plenum cable (/ˈplɛn.əm/, PLEN-əm) is electrical cable that is laid in the plenum spaces of buildings. In the United States, plastics used in the construction of plenum cable are regulated under the National Fire Protection Association standard NFPA 90A: Standard for the Installation of Air Conditioning and Ventilating Systems. All materials intended for use on wire and cables to be placed in plenum spaces are designed to meet rigorous fire safety test standards in accordance with NFPA 262 and outlined in NFPA 90A.

Plenum cable is required because, if nonplenum cable catches fire, it can release toxic fumes. If those fumes are released in a plenum space, they can spread throughout the building through the air circulation system.

Plenum cable is jacketed with a fire-retardant plastic jacket of either a low-smoke polyvinyl chloride (PVC) or a fluorinated ethylene polymer (FEP). Polyolefin formulations, specifically based on polyethylene compounding had been developed by at least two companies in the early to mid-1990s; however, these were never commercialized, and development efforts continue in these yet-untapped product potentials. Development efforts on a non-halogen plenum compound were announced in 2007 citing new flame-retardant synergist packages that may provide an answer for a yet-underdeveloped plenum cable market outside the United States.

In 2006, significant concern developed over the potential toxicity of FEP and related fluorochemicals including the process aid perfluorooctanoic acid (PFOA) or C8 such that California has proposed some of these materials as potential human carcinogens. The NFPA Technical Committee on Air Conditioning, in response to public comment, has referred the issue of toxicity of cabling materials to the NFPA Committee on Toxicity for review before 2008.

In 2007, a development program specifically targeting the production of a non-halogen plenum cable compound was announced to specifically address lingering toxicity concerns presented by halogenated compounds for use in European and other global markets.

== Riser cable ==
Cable that is run between floors in non-plenum areas is rated as riser cable. The fire requirements on riser cable are not as strict. Thus, plenum cable can always replace riser cable, but riser cable cannot replace plenum cable in plenum spaces.

Both plenum and riser cables commonly include a rope or polymer filament with high tensile strength, which helps support the weight of the cable when it is dangling in an open chute.

Cables like twisted-pair, coaxial, HDMI, and DVI are available in both plenum and riser versions. The cable cost is often significantly higher than general-use cable due to the special restricted-use flame retardant materials.

== Cable stiffness ==
Plenum-rated and riser-rated cables are restricted to only allow certain chemicals for manufacture of the wire insulation and cable sheath. Typically this results in reduced flexibility of plastic cables, making it stiff and hard to bend. The bend radius may also be increased, and tight bends can potentially crack or tear the insulation and sheathing.
