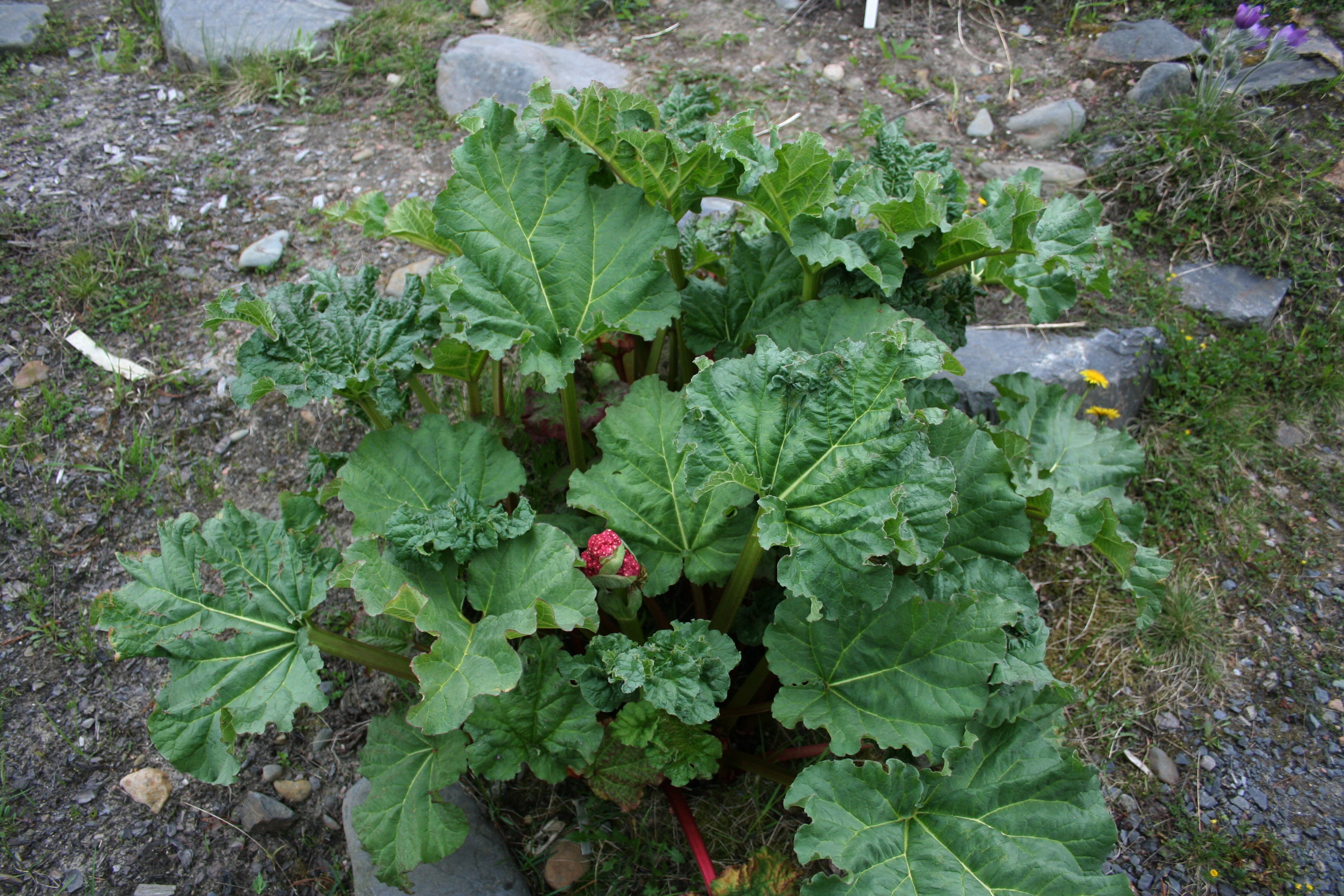

Scientific classification
- Kingdom: Plantae
- Clade: Tracheophytes
- Clade: Angiosperms
- Clade: Eudicots
- Order: Caryophyllales
- Family: Polygonaceae
- Genus: Rheum
- Species: R. australe

Binomial name
- Rheum australe D.Don

Synonyms
- Rheum emodi Wall. ex Meisn.

= Rheum australe =

Species of flowering plant

Rheum australe, synonym Rheum emodi, is a flowering plant in the family Polygonaceae. It is commonly known as Himalayan rhubarb, Indian rhubarb and Red-veined pie plant. It is a medicinal herb used in the Indian Unani system of medicine, and formerly in the European system of medicine where it was traded as Indian rhubarb. The plant is found in the sub-alpine and alpine Himalayas at an altitude of 4000 m.

== Description ==
The plant has a 1.5-2m high stem. Its stem is stout, red, and streaked green and brown. The large leaves are heart-shaped or roundish with a heart-shaped base, and greenish-red in colour. The basal leaves can be up to 60 cm wide.

It has dark reddish-purple or yellow flowers in late spring to summer, in densely-branched clusters, in a inflorescence up to 30 cm long. The inflorescence enlarges greatly when in fruit.

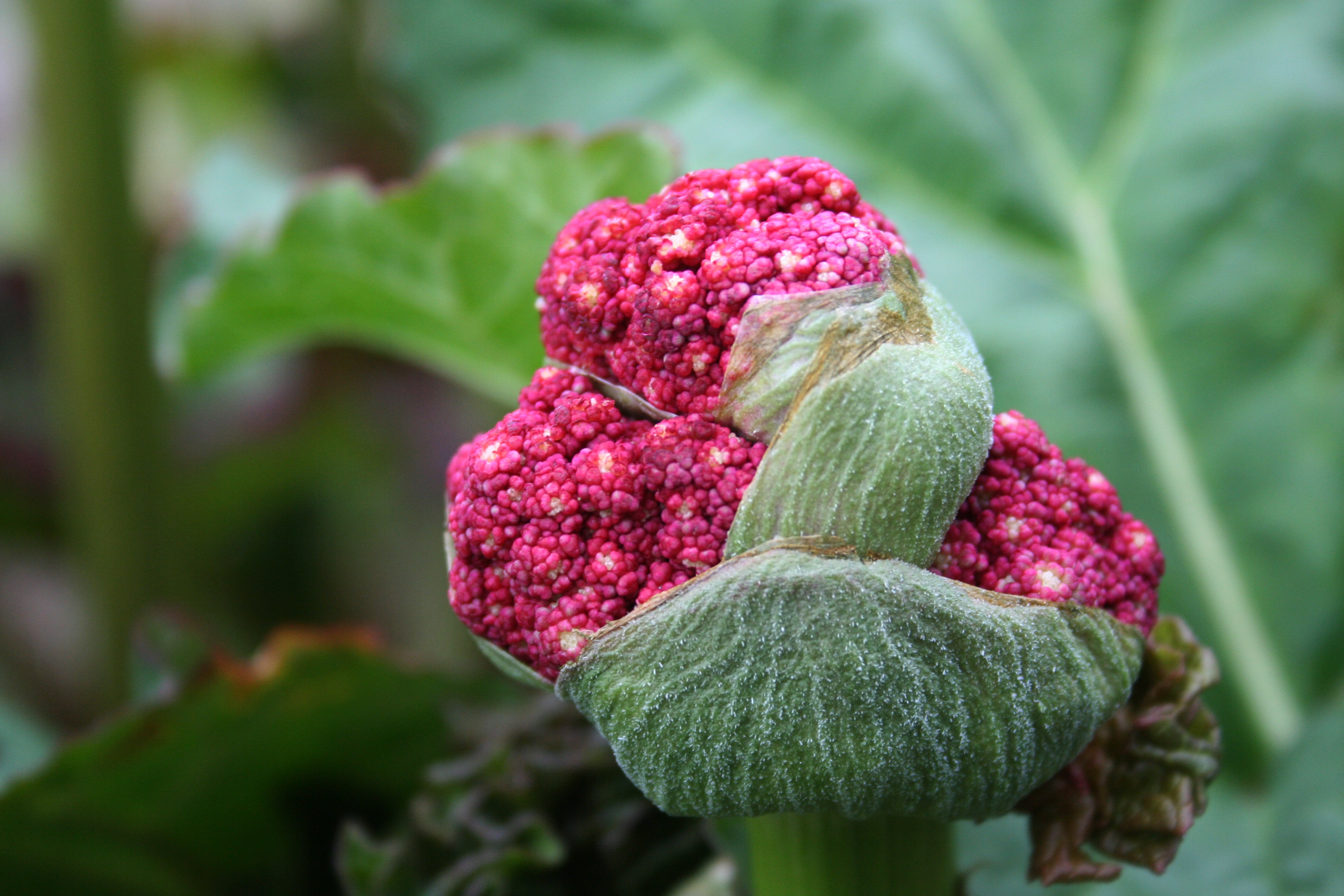
Developing inflorescence in the Oulu University Botanical Gardens, Finland, in early June.

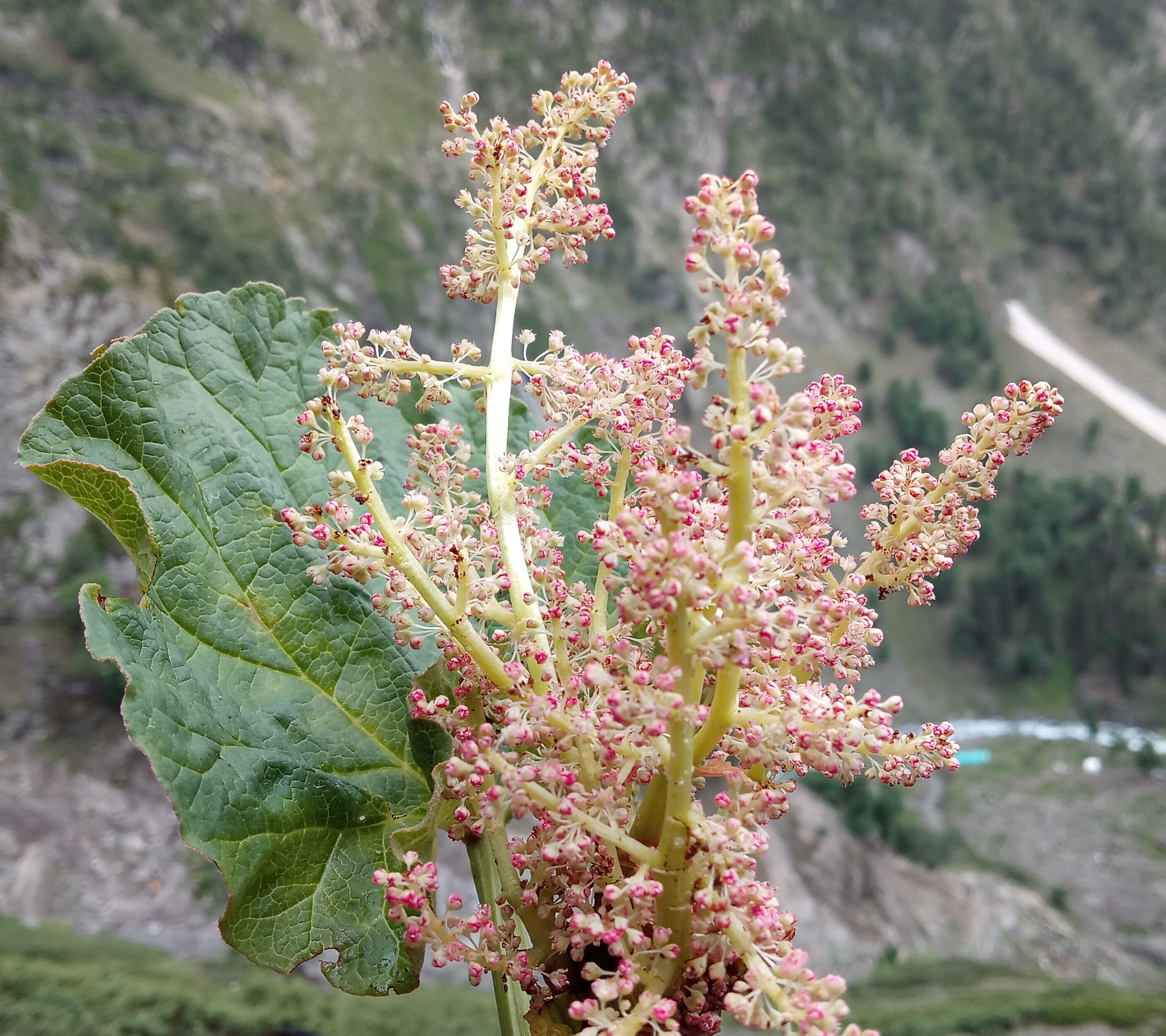
Inflorescence

=== Similar species ===
According to the 2003 key in the Flora of China, this species is distinguished from other entire-leaved rhubarbs in China with leaves having a wavy or crisped margin; R. wittrockii, R. rhabarbarum, R. webbianum and R. hotaoense, by having less than 1 cm-sized fruit, purple-red flowers, and the surface of the rachis of panicle being densely pubescent. It is the only rhubarb in this group to have purple-red flowers as opposed to various shades of white.

=== Karyotypy ===
A 1947 study found plants of R. emodi a chromosome count of 2n=22, but the same study found plants labelled as R. australe to be 2n=44. It is possible that this karyotypic diversity indicates the existence of one or more cryptic species, because the polyploid forms would essentially be reproductively isolated.

== Distribution ==
Native to India, Myanmar, Nepal, Pakistan, Bhutan, and Sikkim.

== Ecology ==
It grows on grassy or rocky slopes, crevices and moraines, forest margins, near streams and between boulders in specific zones. Impatiens glandulifera in the Valley of Flowers, Uttarakhand, India.

== Cultivation ==
It is said to be quite hardy and readily propagated.

== Chemical constituents ==
Hydroxyanthracene derivatives are mainly emodin, chrysophanol and their glycosides. Other hydroxyanthracene derivatives are rhein, aloe emodin and physcion and their glycosides.
