= Hydraecia immanis =

Scientific classification
- Domain: Eukaryota
- Kingdom: Animalia
- Phylum: Arthropoda
- Class: Insecta
- Order: Lepidoptera
- Superfamily: Noctuoidea
- Family: Noctuidae
- Genus: Hydraecia
- Species: H. immanis

Binomial name
- Hydraecia immanis Guenée, 1852

Species of moth

Hydraecia immanis, the hop vine borer moth is a moth in the family Noctuidae native to North America. The species was described by Achille Guenée in 1852. It is listed as a species of special concern and is believed to be extirpated from the US state of Connecticut.

== Food ==
It is a considered a root pest of several crops, including Zea mays (corn), and Humulus lupulus (common hop). It also feeds on Silphium species, and Lupinus microcarpus.
