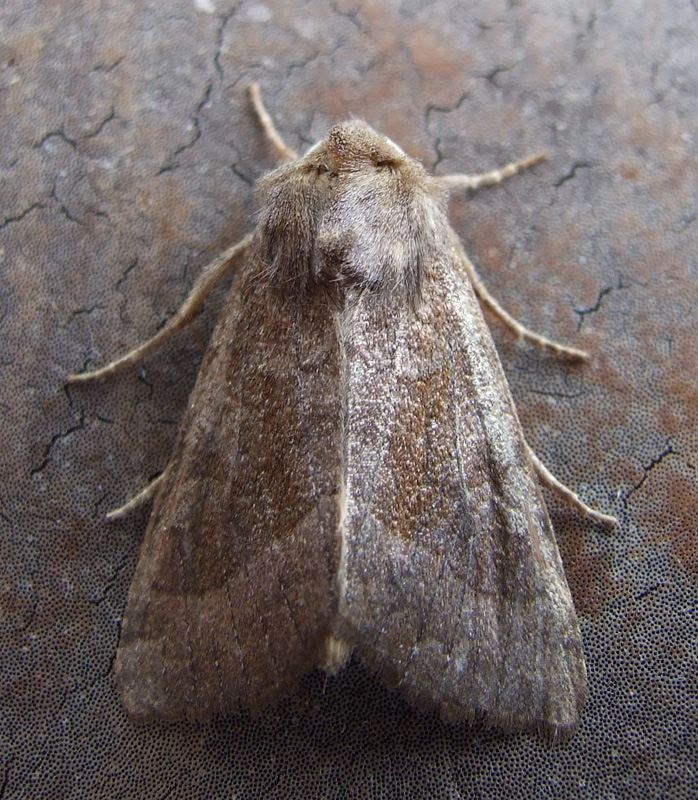

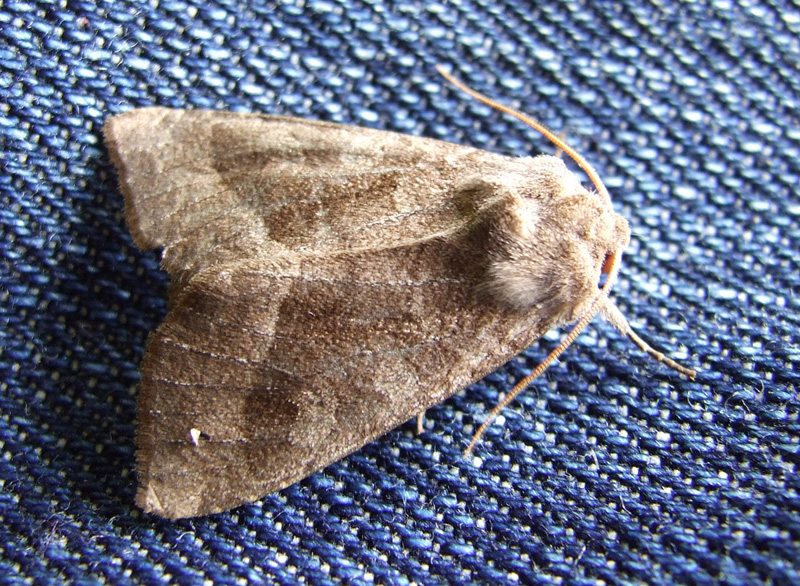

Scientific classification
- Domain: Eukaryota
- Kingdom: Animalia
- Phylum: Arthropoda
- Class: Insecta
- Order: Lepidoptera
- Superfamily: Noctuoidea
- Family: Noctuidae
- Genus: Hydraecia
- Species: H. petasitis

Binomial name
- Hydraecia petasitis Doubleday, 1847

Synonyms
- Gortyna vindelica Freyer, 1848; Hydroecia micacea viola Bryk, 1949; Hydroecia petasitis var. amurensis Staudinger, 1892

= Hydraecia petasitis =

Species of moth

The Butterbur (Hydraecia petasitis) is a species of moth in the family Noctuidae. It is found from most of Europe, east to Siberia and Japan.

== Technical description and variation ==
H. petasitis Dbl. (46 d). Forewing dull purplish grey, shaded with olive brown; the median shade, the outer half of median area, the terminal area except at apex, and a costal patch before submarginal line, all of this latter colour; lines as in micacea, but the outer line more curved, sometimes visibly bent on vein 5; submarginal line generally preceded by a narrow dark cloud; the stigmata large, pale grey, with dark outlines; hindwing dull dark grey with a darker outer line and submarginal cloud; continental specimens, = vindelicia Frr., are larger and better marked than the dull British petasitis. Larva dirty bone-colour, with the dark dorsal vessel showing through; the tubercles black; spiracles white in black rings; head, thoracic, and anal plates brown. The wingspan is 44–50 mm.

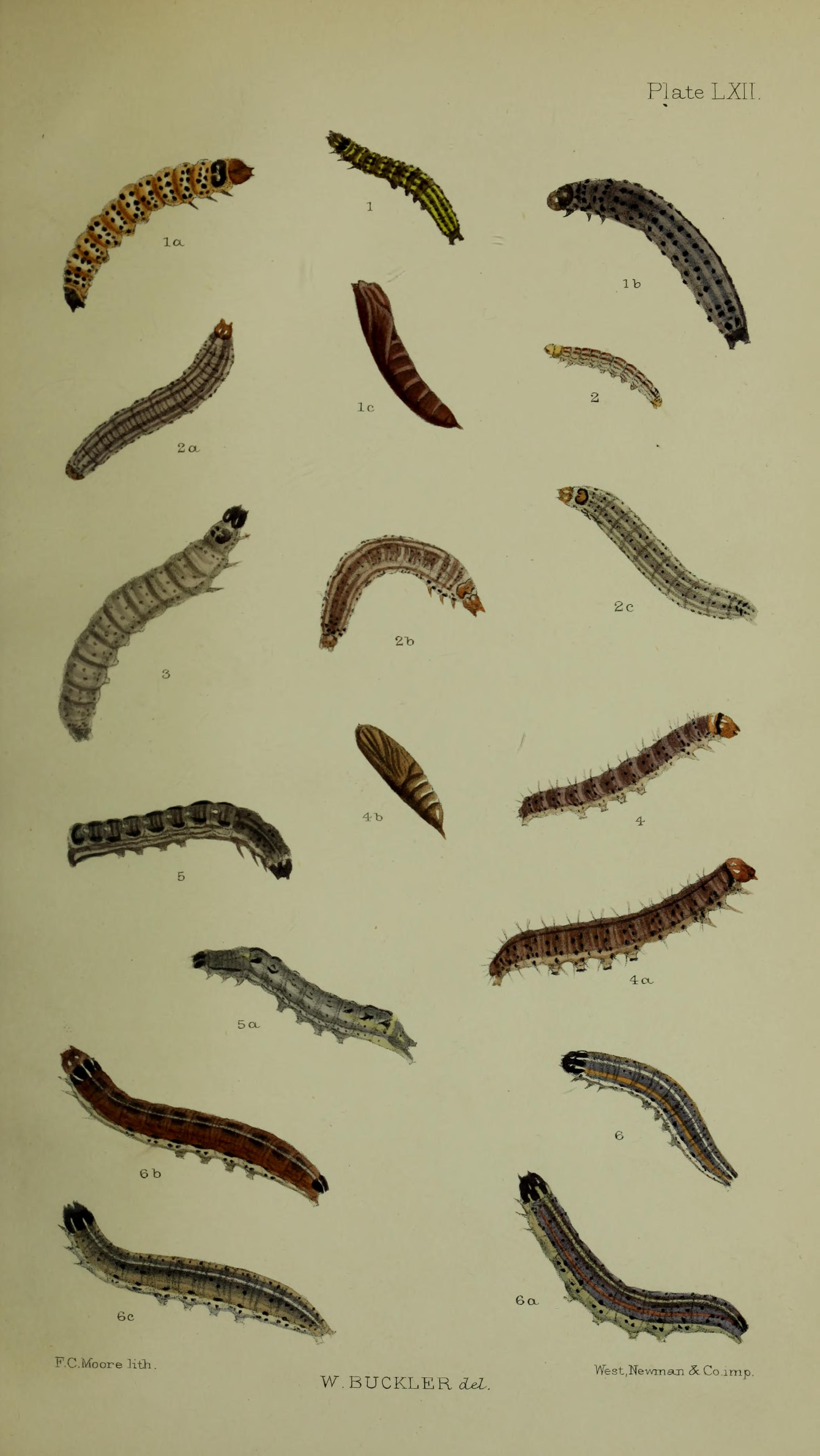
Fig. 3 larva after last moult

== Biology ==
Adults emerge in August and the beginning of September.

The larvae feed on Petasites hybridus from within the stem and later the roots. They are found from April to the beginning of July.

== Subspecies ==
- Hydraecia petasitis petasitis (Europe)
- Hydraecia petasitis amurensis Staudinger, 1892 (southern Siberia, Amur, Japan)
