= Rheic =

Rheic may refer to:

- Rheic Ocean, a Paleozoic ocean between the large continent Gondwana to the south and the microcontinents Avalonia and others
- Rheic acid, a synonym for the molecule rhein
