= Hydraecia intermedia =

Scientific classification
- Domain: Eukaryota
- Kingdom: Animalia
- Phylum: Arthropoda
- Class: Insecta
- Order: Lepidoptera
- Superfamily: Noctuoidea
- Family: Noctuidae
- Genus: Hydraecia
- Species: H. intermedia

Binomial name
- Hydraecia intermedia (Barnes & Benjamin, 1924)

Synonyms
- Gortyna intermedia Barnes & Benjamin, 1924

Species of moth

Hydraecia intermedia is a moth in the family Noctuidae first described by William Barnes and Foster Hendrickson Benjamin in 1924. It is only known from the holotype, with the type locality of Fort Calgary in south-western Alberta, Canada.

The forewing is warm yellow brown, with markings that are more like those of Hydraecia obliqua.
