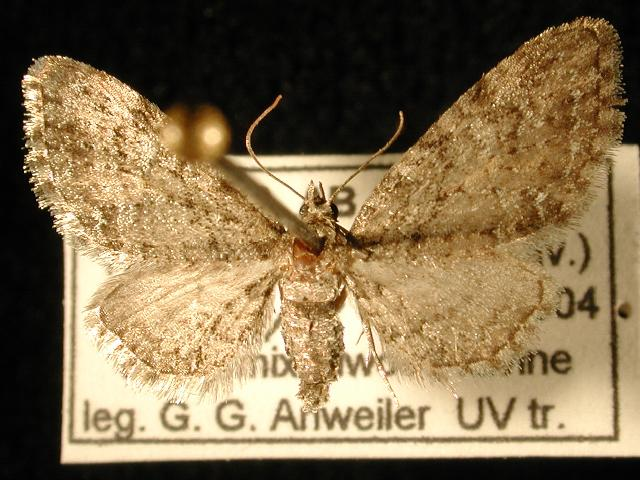

Scientific classification
- Domain: Eukaryota
- Kingdom: Animalia
- Phylum: Arthropoda
- Class: Insecta
- Order: Lepidoptera
- Family: Geometridae
- Genus: Eupithecia
- Species: E. columbiata

Binomial name
- Eupithecia columbiata (Dyar, 1904)

Synonyms
- Tephroclystia columbiata Dyar, 1904; Eupithecia erpata Pearsall, 1908; Eupithecia holbergata MacKay, 1951

= Eupithecia columbiata =

Species of moth

Eupithecia columbiata is a moth in the family Geometridae first described by Harrison Gray Dyar Jr. in 1904. It is found in North America from eastern Newfoundland and Labrador to Vancouver Island, south to North Carolina in the east and Colorado in the west.

The wingspan is 13–24 mm. Adults are on wing in spring, from mid April to mid June in Alberta.

The larvae feed on Rhamnus purshiana, Betula papyrifera, Salix, Prunus, Alnus, Cornus, Philadelphus, Ceanothus, Populus, Amelanchier and Acer species.
