= Diacerein =

Chemical compound

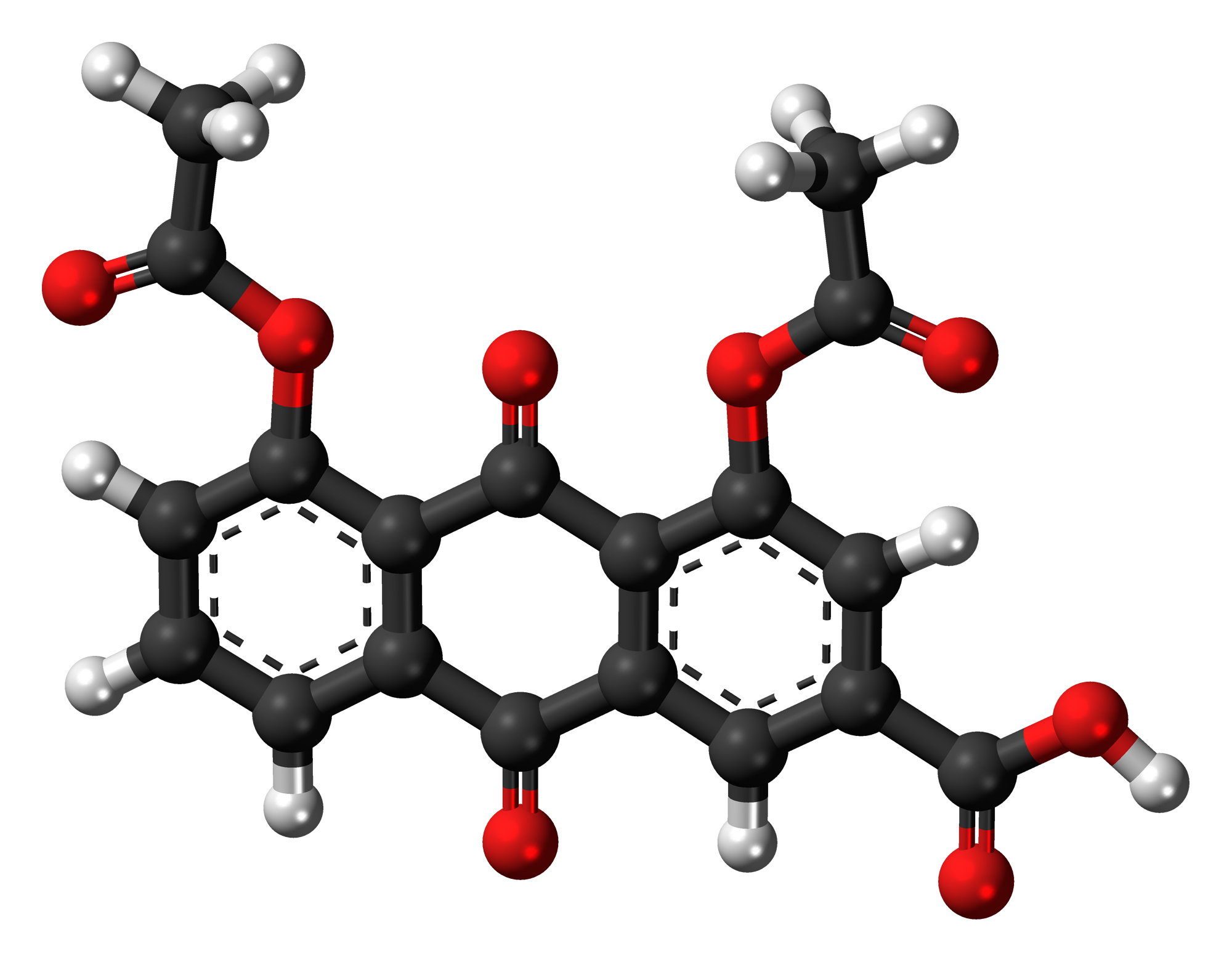

Clinical data
- Other names: Diacetylrhein; Diacerhein; 2-Anthracenecarboxylic acid, 4,5-bis(acetyloxy)-9,10-dihydro-9,10-dioxo-; 2-Anthroic acid, 9,10-dihydro-4,5-dihydroxy-9,10-dioxo-, diacetate; 9,10-Dihydro-4,5-dihydroxy-9,10-dioxo-2-anthroic acid, diacetate
- AHFS/Drugs.com: International Drug Names
- Pregnancy category: Lacking information
- Routes of administration: Oral
- ATC code: M01AX21 (WHO)

Pharmacokinetic data
- Protein binding: 99%
- Metabolism: Hepatic: deacetylation to rhein, later glucuronidation and sulfate conjugation
- Elimination half-life: 4 to 5 hours
- Excretion: Renal (30%)

Identifiers
- IUPAC name: 4,5-diacetyloxy-9,10-dioxo-anthracene-2- carboxylic acid
- CAS Number: 13739-02-1
- PubChem CID: 26248
- DrugBank: DB11994
- ChemSpider: 24456
- UNII: 4HU6J11EL5
- KEGG: D07270
- ChEMBL: ChEMBL41286
- CompTox Dashboard (EPA): DTXSID4045636
- ECHA InfoCard: 100.033.904

Chemical and physical data
- Formula: C_{19}H_{12}O_{8}
- Molar mass: 368.297 g·mol^{−1}
- 3D model (JSmol): Interactive image
- Solubility in water: Practically insoluble in water 0.01 mg/mL (20 °C)
- SMILES: O=C(Oc3cccc2C(=O)c1cc(cc(OC(=O)C)c1C(=O)c23)C(=O)O)C
- InChI: InChI=1S/C19H12O8/c1-8(20)26-13-5-3-4-11-15(13)18(23)16-12(17(11)22)6-10(19(24)25)7-14(16)27-9(2)21/h3-7H,1-2H3,(H,24,25); Key:TYNLGDBUJLVSMA-UHFFFAOYSA-N

Diacerein (INN), also known as diacetylrhein, is a slow-acting medicine of the class anthraquinone used to treat joint diseases such as osteoarthritis. It works by inhibiting interleukin-1 beta. An updated 2014 Cochrane review found diacerein had a small beneficial effect on pain. Diacerein-containing medications are registered in some European Union and Asian countries and included as a treatment option on several international therapeutic guidelines.

== Synthesis ==
Various synthetic routes to diacerein have been developed, most of which utilize aloin as a precursor. The hydroxyl groups of aloin are acetylated, and the intermediates are subsequently oxidized using chromic anhydride in an acetic acid solvent system..

A less common method uses rhein as the starting compound. It involves diacetylation of the hydroxyl groups at positions C4 and C5 of rhein.

== Pharmacology ==
Diacerein works by blocking the actions of interleukin-1 beta, a protein involved in the inflammation and destruction of cartilage that plays a role in the development of symptoms of degenerative joint diseases such as osteoarthritis. Due to its specific mode of action, which does not involve the inhibition of prostaglandin synthesis, diacerein has been shown to have anti-osteoarthritis and cartilage stimulating properties in vitro and animal models.

== Side effects ==
The most common side effects of diacerein treatment are gastrointestinal symptoms including soft stools and diarrhea. These are generally mild to moderate and occur more frequently in the first 2 weeks, and lessen with continued treatment. Based on review by European Medicines Agency (EMA), diacerein-containing medicines use is restricted due to severe diarrhoea and liver disorders in patients.

An uncommon side effect is hepatic adverse events (most frequently reported as liver function test abnormalities). These have been described as mild/moderate cases of elevated liver enzymes in the blood.

Mild skin reactions (rash, pruritus and eczema) have also been reported with diacerein treatment.

Discoloration of urine (yellow or pink) is another side effect of diacerein. This effect is due to the elimination of rhein metabolites via the urine and no clinical significance has been found; it may also be dependent on general fluid intake.

== Special warning ==
In 2014 the European Medicines Agency (EMA's) Pharmacovigilance and Risk Assessment Committee (PRAC) performed a review of diacerein-containing medicines over concerns about its gastrointestinal and liver effects. As a result, the PRAC has introduced additional proposals to manage diacerein's risks and was satisfied that with new restrictions diacerein's benefit on pain outweighs the side effects for osteoarthritis treatment. The following recommendations have been made around the use of diacerein:

- Due to the potential complications that can occur as a result of diarrhea in older adults, diacerein is no longer recommended in patients aged 65 years and above.
- It is also advised that patients start treatment on half the normal dose (i.e. 50 mg daily instead of 100 mg daily), and should stop taking diacerein if diarrhea occurs.
- It should not be used in any patient with liver disease or a history of liver disease, and doctors should be monitoring their patients for early signs of liver problems.
- The use of diacerein is to be limited to treating symptoms of osteoarthritis affecting the hip or knee.
- Diacerein should not be administered during pregnancy and lactation.

The PRAC concluded that the benefit-risk balance of diacerein-containing medicinal products remained favourable in the symptomatic treatment osteoarthritis, subject to the agreed changes to the product information and conditions.

== Dosage and administration ==
The recommended starting dose is 50 mg once daily with evening meal for the first 2 to 4 weeks of treatment, after which the recommended daily dose is 50 mg twice daily.

== See also ==
- Rhein
