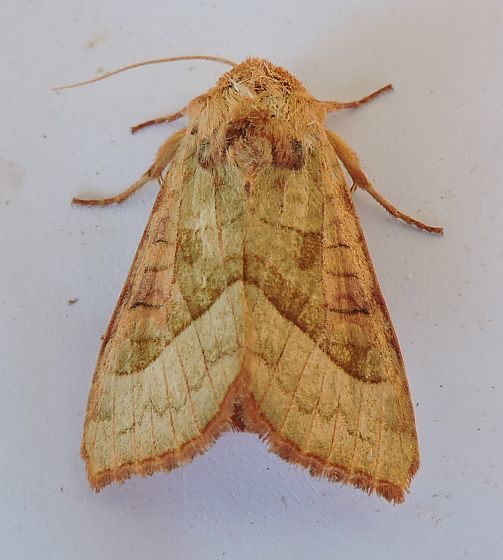

Scientific classification
- Domain: Eukaryota
- Kingdom: Animalia
- Phylum: Arthropoda
- Class: Insecta
- Order: Lepidoptera
- Superfamily: Noctuoidea
- Family: Noctuidae
- Genus: Hydraecia
- Species: H. stramentosa

Binomial name
- Hydraecia stramentosa Guenée, 1852

= Hydraecia stramentosa =

Species of moth

Hydraecia stramentosa, commonly known as the figwort borer moth, is a species of cutworm or dart moth in the family Noctuidae. It is found in North America.
