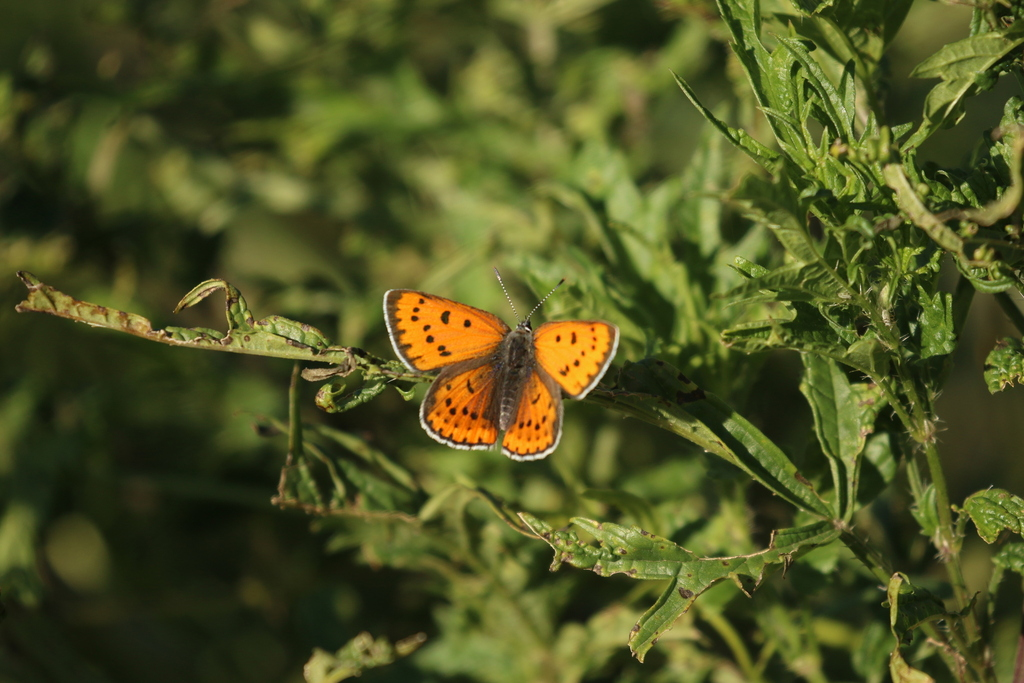

Scientific classification
- Kingdom: Animalia
- Phylum: Arthropoda
- Class: Insecta
- Order: Lepidoptera
- Family: Lycaenidae
- Genus: Lycaena
- Species: L. violacea

Binomial name
- Lycaena violacea (Staudinger, 1892)

= Lycaena violacea =

Species of butterfly

Lycaena violacea is a small butterfly found in the Palearctic (Altai Mountains, Sayan Mountains, Transbaikalia, Mongolia, North China ) that belongs to the lycaenids or blues family.

== Description ==
Upperside with deeper red ground colour than Lycaena splendens (Staudinger, 1881) and Lycaena dabrerai Bálint, 1996. Upperside forewing postdiscal markings are well developed, underside forewing black spots are ringed white. Hindwing upperside, the ground colour is fuscous violet. The ground colour of the hindwing underside is brownish grey. The male genital valvae are larger than in L. splendens and L. dabrerai and lack a ventral extension.

== Description from Seitz ==
[C. splendens Stgr. (76 g, h) now Lycaena splendens (Staudinger, 1881) In this magnificent, very intensely glossy golden butterfly the upperside is very similar in the sexes. The wings are golden red, dusted with black at the base, the forewing being traversed by one row of submarginal dots and the hindwing by tuw. The underside is similar to that of dispar rutilus, the ground-colour of the hindwing being yellowish grey. From Central Asia.] — Specimens with the hindwing beneath dark bluish grey and the upperside slightly glossy violet are violaceus Stgr., from East Asia (Amurland, Mongolia).

== Biology ==
The larva on feeds on Rheum rhabarbarum

== See also ==
- List of butterflies of Russia
