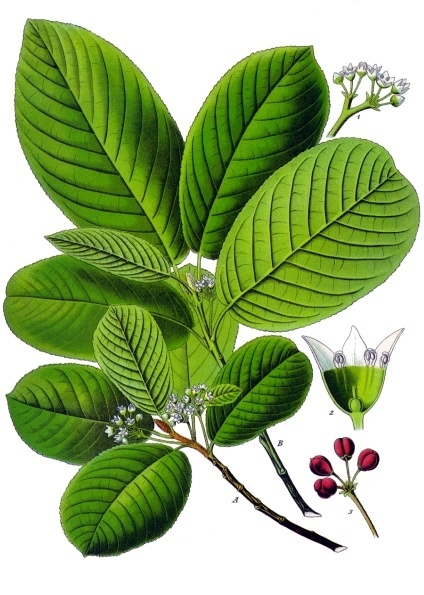

Conservation status
- Least Concern (IUCN 3.1)

- Secure (NatureServe)

Scientific classification
- Kingdom: Plantae
- Clade: Tracheophytes
- Clade: Angiosperms
- Clade: Eudicots
- Clade: Rosids
- Order: Rosales
- Family: Rhamnaceae
- Genus: Frangula
- Species: F. purshiana

Binomial name
- Frangula purshiana (DC.) A.Gray ex J.G.Cooper

Subspecies
- Frangula purshiana subsp. annonifolia (Greene) Sawyer & S.W.Edwards; Frangula purshiana subsp. purshiana; Frangula purshiana subsp. ultramafica Sawyer & S.W.Edwards
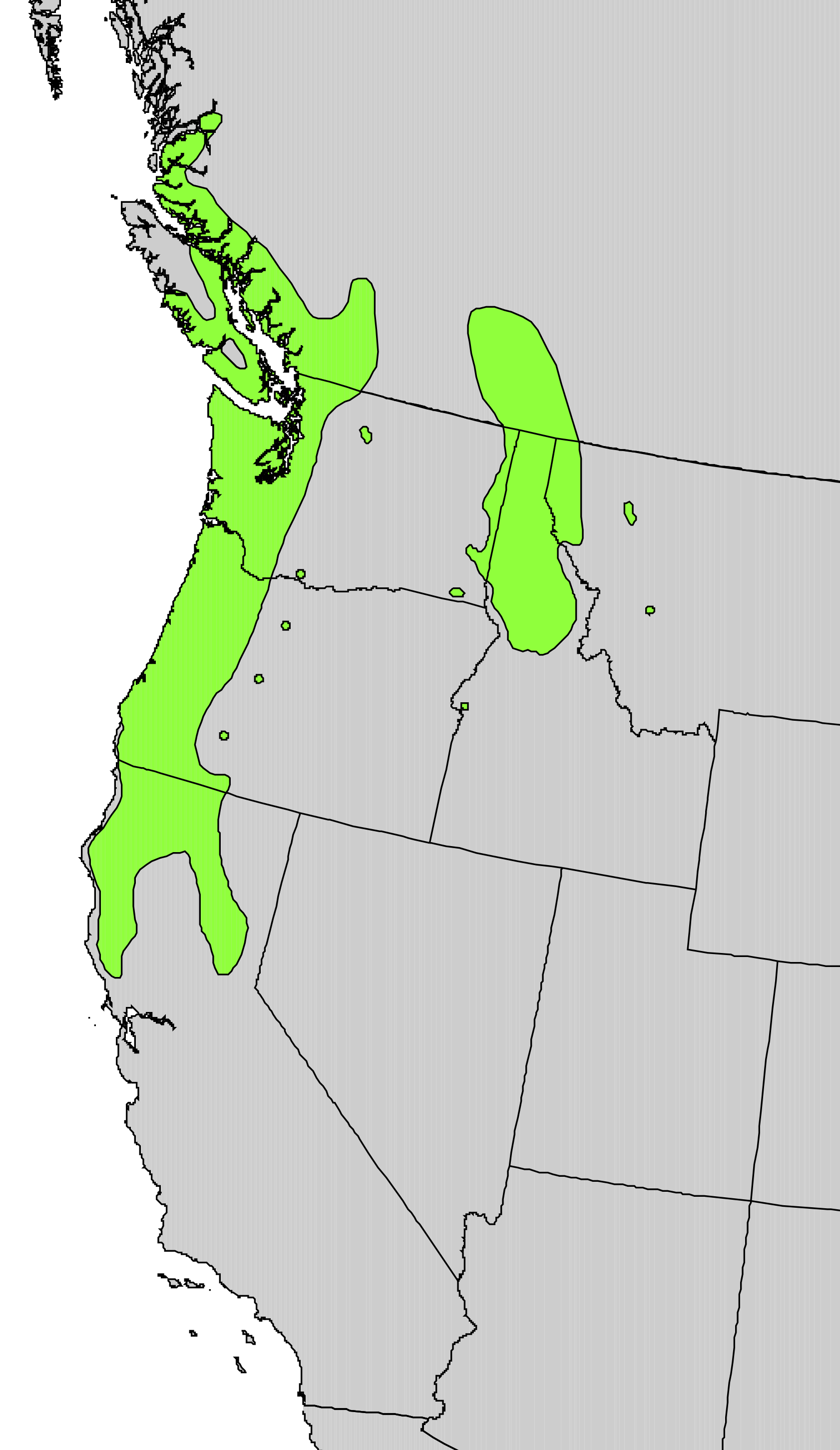
- Natural range

Synonyms
- Rhamnus alnifolia Pursh; Rhamnus purshiana DC.; synonyms of subsp. annonifolia: Frangula anonifolia (Greene) Grubov; Rhamnus annonifolia Greene; Rhamnus purshiana var. annonifolia (Greene) Jeps.; synonyms of subsp. purshiana: Cardiolepis obtusa Raf.; Rhamnus purshiana var. hirtella Schelle

= Frangula purshiana =

Species of buckhorn shrub

Frangula purshiana (cascara, cascara buckthorn, cascara sagrada, bearberry, and in Chinook Jargon, chittem stick and chitticum stick; syn. Rhamnus purshiana) is a species of plant in the family Rhamnaceae. It is native to western North America from southern British Columbia south to central California, and eastward to northwestern Montana.

The dried bark of cascara was used as a laxative in folk medicine by the indigenous peoples of the Pacific Northwest, and later worldwide in conventional medicines until 2002.

== Description ==
Cascara is a large shrub or small tree 4.5–12 m (15–39 ft) tall, with a trunk 20–50 cm (7.9–19.7 in) in diameter. The buds have no scales, unique for the northwest region.

The thin bark is brownish to silver-gray with light splotching (often, in part, from lichens); the inner bark is smooth and yellowish (turning dark brown with age and/or exposure to sunlight). Cascara bark has an intensely bitter flavor that will remain in the mouth for hours, overpowering and even numbing the taste buds.

The leaves are simple, deciduous, alternate, clustered near the ends of twigs. They are oval, 5–15 cm (2.0–5.9 in) long and 2–5 cm (0.79–1.97 in) wide with a 0.6–2 cm (0.24–0.79 in) petiole, shiny and green on top, and a dull, paler green below; they have tiny teeth on the margins, and 10–12 pairs of pinnate veins. The leaves turn yellow in autumn.

The flowers are tiny, 3–5 mm (0.12–0.20 in) diameter, with five greenish yellow petals, forming a cup shape. The flowers bloom in umbel-shaped clusters, on the ends of distinctive peduncles that are attached to the leaf axils. The flowering season is brief, from early to mid- spring, disappearing by early summer. The fruit is a drupe 6–10 mm (0.24–0.39 in) diameter, bright red at first, quickly maturing deep purple or black, and containing a yellow pulp, and two or three hard, smooth, olive-green or black seeds.

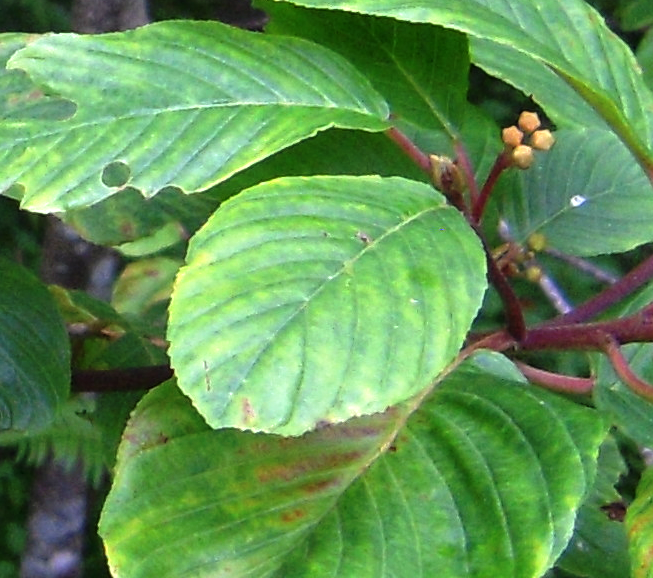
Closeup of leaf and buds

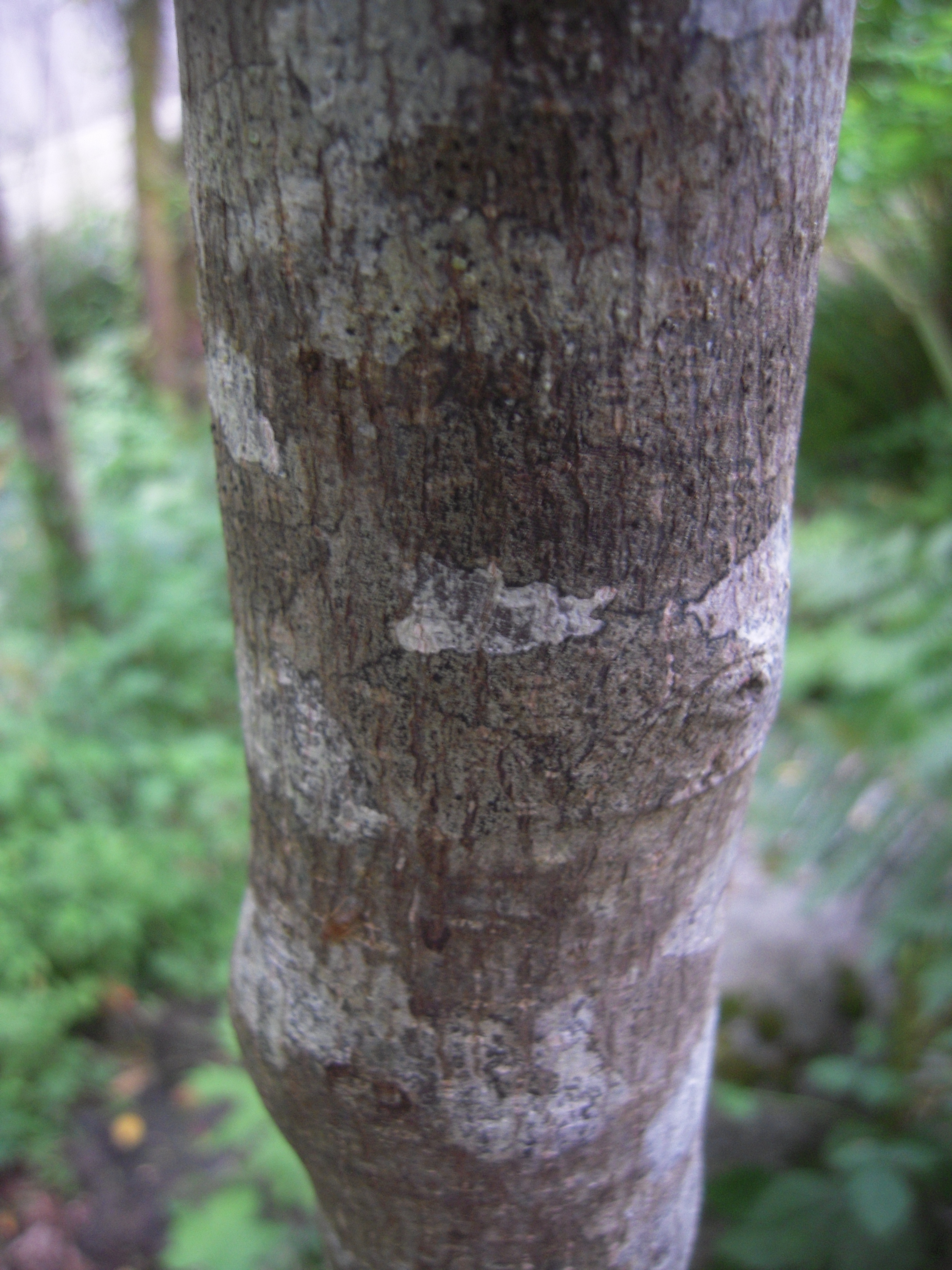
Splotchy bark

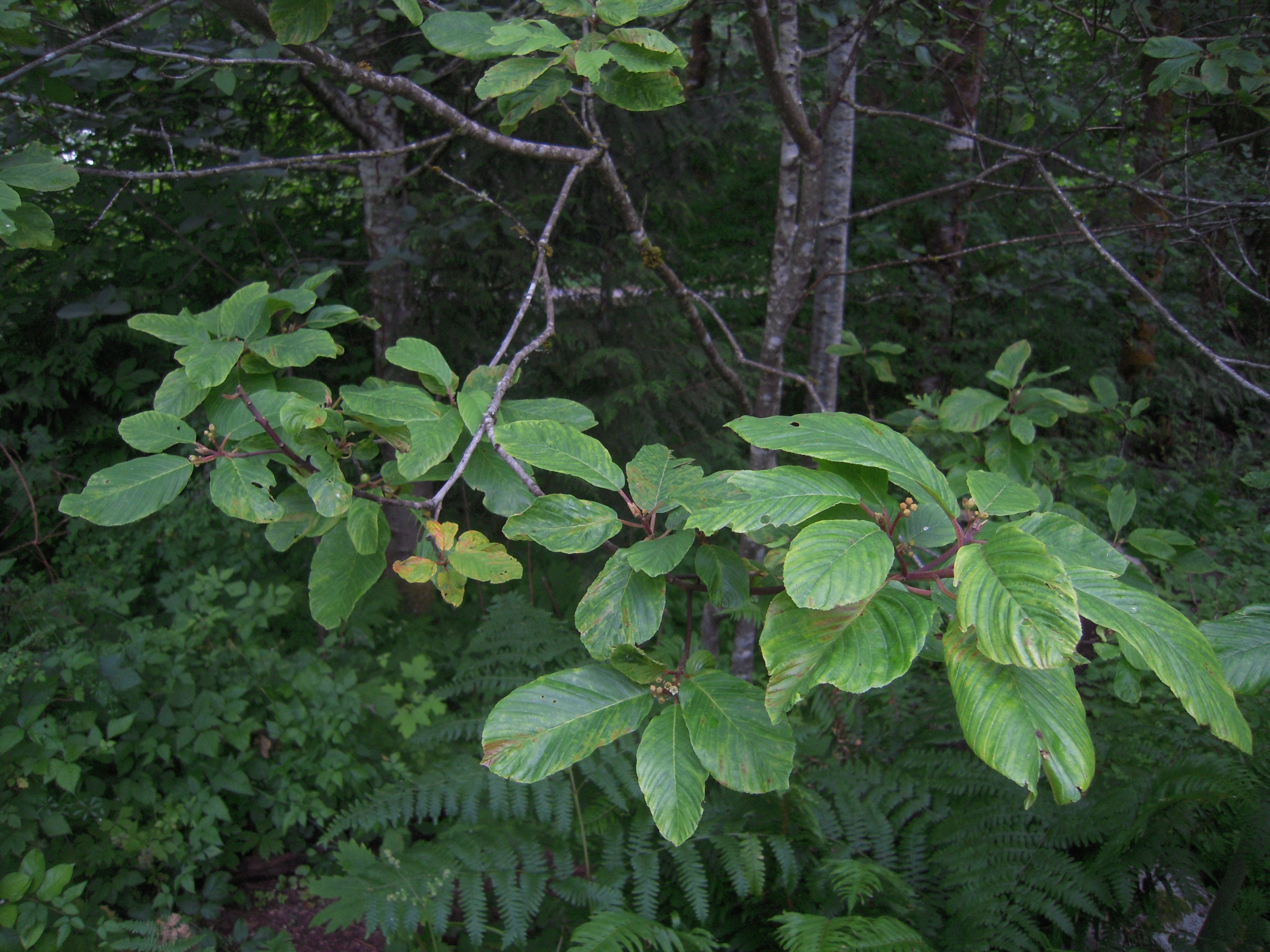
Branch with prominently veined, alternate leaves, reddish twigs, and clusters of flowers at the leaf axils

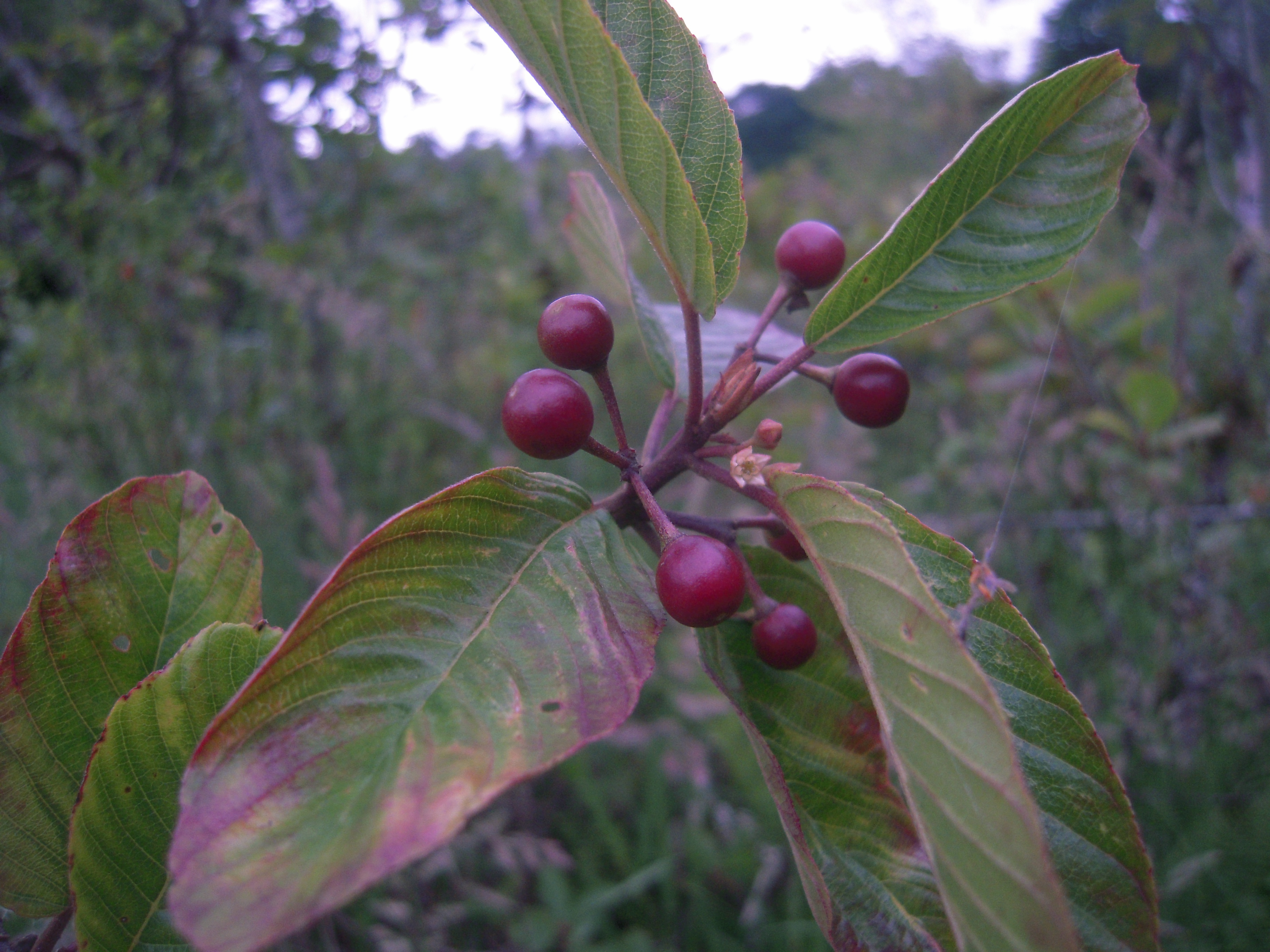
Leaves, flower, and young fruits

== Distribution and habitat ==
Cascara is native from northern California to British Columbia and east to the Rocky Mountains in Montana. It is often found along streamsides in the mixed deciduous-coniferous forests of valleys, and in moist montane forests. Cascara is common in the understory of bigleaf maple forest, alongside red osier dogwood and red alder.

In many areas, the high market demand for cascara bark led to over-harvesting from wild trees, which may have heavily reduced cascara populations.

== Ecology ==
The fruit is eaten by birds, bears, raccoons, and other mammals, who distribute the undigestible seeds.

The leaves are browsed by mule deer in Oregon and elk in northern Idaho, especially in the winter months. Olympic black bears, Oregon gray foxes, and raccoons also eat Cascara foliage, as well as ring-tailed cats where their range overlaps with Cascara in Northern California.

Cascara is shade tolerant. Its trees create brushy stands which provide abundant thermal cover and hiding places for wildlife.

Cascara is usually top-killed by fire, but may resprout from the root crown. After more severe fires, it reestablishes via off-site seed beginning the second year after the fire. It typically inhabits areas with fire regimes on 30 to 150 year intervals, although it is also found in areas with fire regimes of 500+ years.

== Toxicity ==
The fruit and bark contain a bitter chemical making them inedible to humans, although there are contested medicinal uses.

Until 2002, cascara was the principal ingredient in commercial, over-the-counter (OTC) laxatives in North American pharmacies until the U.S. Food and Drug Administration (FDA) issued a final rule banning the use of aloe and cascara as laxative ingredients. Serious adverse effects may occur from using cascara, including dehydration, loss of electrolyte levels (such as potassium, sodium, chloride), heart rhythm irregularities, and muscle weakness. There is also concern for its potential carcinogenicity. Laxatives should also not be used by people with Crohn's disease, irritable bowel syndrome, colitis, hemorrhoids, appendicitis, or kidney problems. Use of cascara is a safety concern for pregnant or breastfeeding women, and for children.

=== Dietary supplement ===
Cascara is sold in the United States as a natural "dietary supplement" rather than a drug, and its common use is ingested by mouth to relieve constipation. Although it may be safe for use over a few days, there is insufficient scientific evidence to assure its safety and effectiveness. Use of cascara may adversely affect the actions of various prescribed drugs, such as digoxin, warfarin, corticosteroids, and diuretic agents.

=== Phytochemistry ===
Numerous quinoid phytochemicals are present in cascara bark. The chemicals possibly contributing to a laxative effect are the hydroxyanthracene glycosides, which include cascarosides A, B, C, and D. Cascara contains approximately 8% anthranoids by mass, of which about two-thirds are cascarosides. The hydroxyanthracene glycosides may trigger peristalsis by inhibiting the absorption of water and electrolytes in the large intestine, which increases the volume of the bowel contents, leading to increased pressure.

The hydroxyanthracene glycosides are not readily absorbed in the small intestine, but are hydrolyzed by intestinal flora to a form that is partly absorbed in the colon. Some of the chemical constituents present in the bark may be excreted by the kidneys. The extract from cascara bark also contains emodin, which may contribute to the laxative effect.

== Uses ==
=== Traditional medicine ===
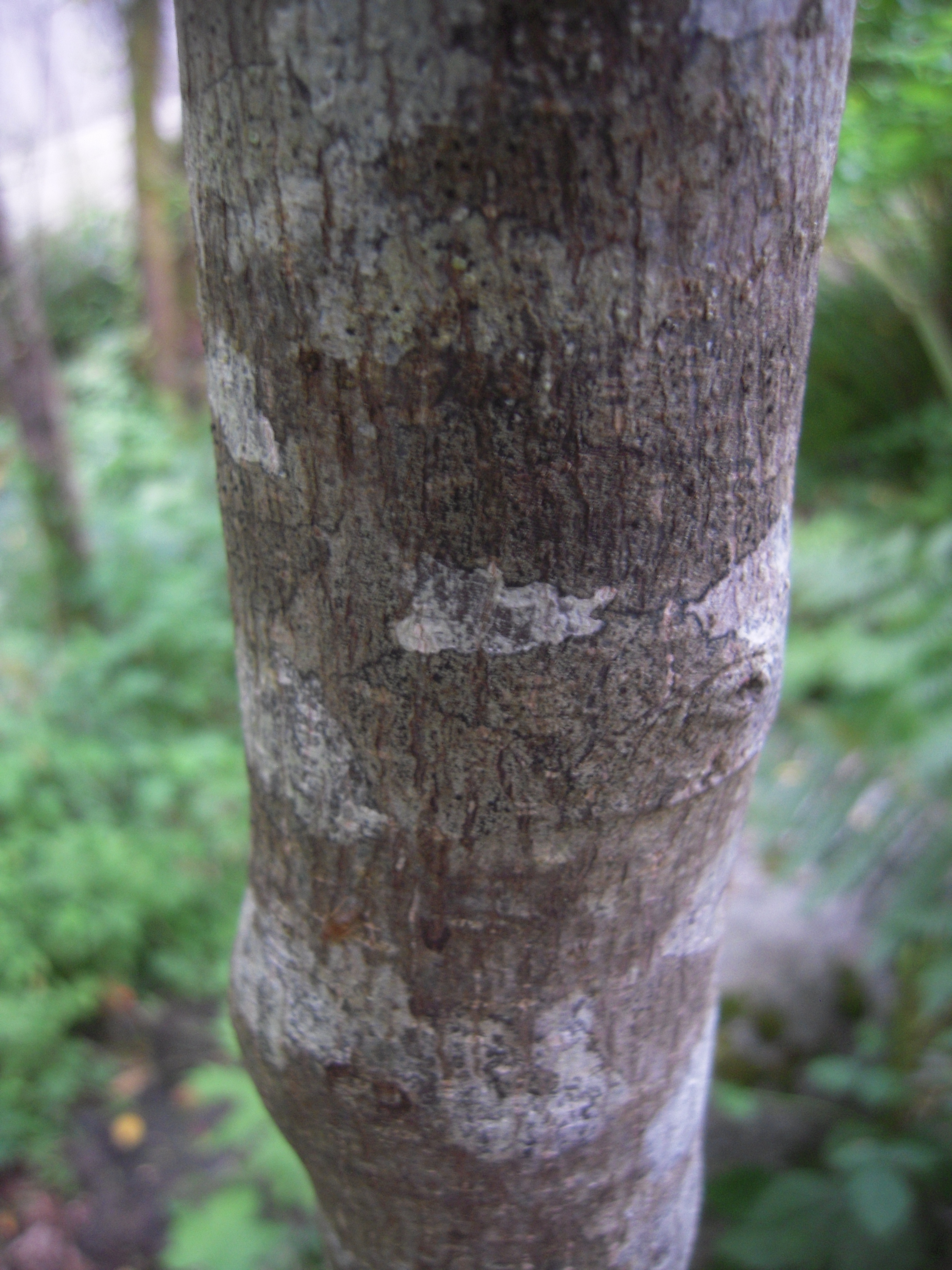
Bark – the part of the plant which, after being dried, is used as a laxative

Cascara was used in traditional medicine as a laxative. The dried, aged bark of R. purshiana used by indigenous native cultures and settler Euro-Americans as a laxative is similar to other anthraquinone-containing herbal preparations of leaves and fruits of senna, the latex of Aloe vera, and the root of the rhubarb plant. Commercially, it is called "cascara sagrada" ('sacred bark' in Spanish), while in the local trade language Chinook Jargon it is known as "chittem bark" or "chitticum bark". Following its introduction to formal U.S. medicine in 1877, it replaced the berries of R. catharticus as the favored laxative. The historical interest in using cascara damaged native cascara populations during the 1900s due to overharvesting.

==== Preparation in folk medicine ====
The bark is collected in the spring or early summer, when it easily peels from the tree.

Once stripped from the tree, the bark must be aged for several months, because fresh cut, dried bark causes vomiting and violent diarrhea. This drying is generally done in the shade to preserve its characteristic yellow color. This process can be quickened by simply baking the bark at a low temperature for several hours. Botanist J. Morton suggests using a dose of 10–30 grains, dissolved in water, or 0.6–2.0 cc for fluid extract. J.A. Duke suggests an effective dosage is approximately 1–3 grams (15–46 gr) dried bark, or 1–2.5 grams (15–39 gr) powdered bark.

=== Other uses ===
The fruit can also be eaten cooked or raw, but has a laxative effect. The food industry sometimes uses cascara as a flavoring agent for liquors, soft drinks, ice cream, and baked goods. Cascara honey is edible, but slightly laxative. The wood is used by local people for posts, firewood, and turnery. It is also planted as an ornamental, to provide food and habitat for wildlife, or to prevent soil erosion. Due to its bitter taste, cascara can be used to stop nail-biting by applying it to the fingernails.
