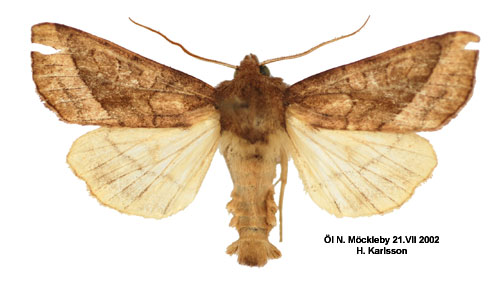

Scientific classification
- Domain: Eukaryota
- Kingdom: Animalia
- Phylum: Arthropoda
- Class: Insecta
- Order: Lepidoptera
- Superfamily: Noctuoidea
- Family: Noctuidae
- Genus: Hydraecia
- Species: H. ultima

Binomial name
- Hydraecia ultima Holst, 1965

= Hydraecia ultima =

Species of moth

Hydraecia ultima is a moth belonging to the family Noctuidae. The species was first described by P. L. Holst in 1965. It is very similar to Hydraecia micacea and Hydraecia nordstroemi. Specimens can only be reliably identified and distinguished by a genital examination

It is native to Palearctic.
