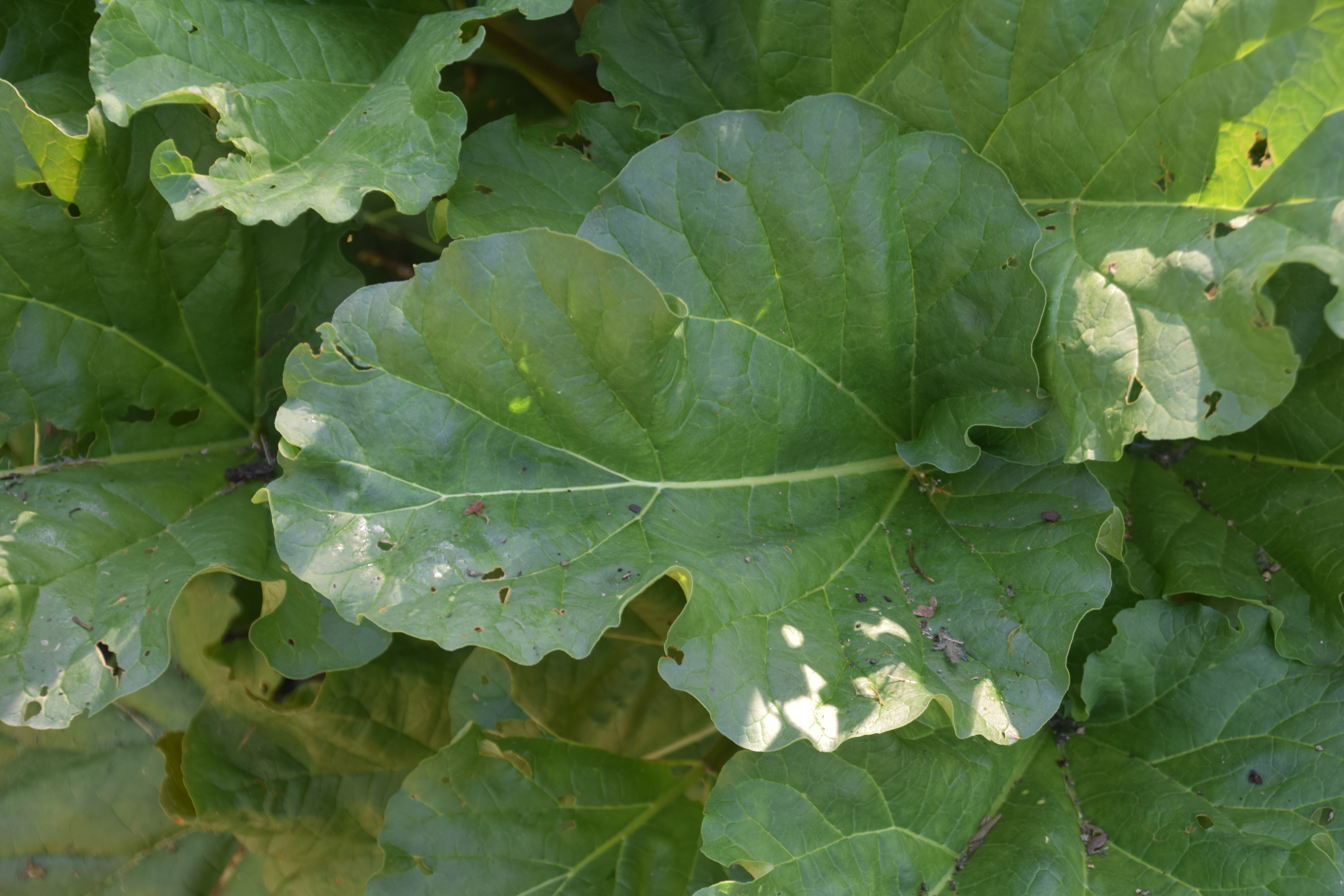

Scientific classification
- Kingdom: Plantae
- Clade: Tracheophytes
- Clade: Angiosperms
- Clade: Eudicots
- Order: Caryophyllales
- Family: Polygonaceae
- Genus: Rheum
- Species: R. rhabarbarum

Binomial name
- Rheum rhabarbarum L.

Synonyms
- Rheum franzenbachii Münter; Rheum franzenbachii var. mongolium Münter; Rheum macropterum Mart.; Rheum muricatum Blanco; Rheum sanguineum Meisn.; Rheum undulatum L.; Rheum undulatum var. longifolium C. Y. Cheng & T. C. Kao

= Rheum rhabarbarum =

Species of plant

Rheum rhabarbarum is a species of flowering plant in the family Polygonaceae, native to a region stretching from southern Siberia to north and central China. It has been harvested from the wild for centuries for its root, which was harvested for use as a popular medicine in Europe and Asia. It was later cultivated for its root in England and Russia. It is considered to be one of the species involved in the development of culinary rhubarb, for which the scientific name R. rhabarbarum is sometimes (erroneously) used.

== Taxonomy ==
Rheum rhabarbarum was first described by Carl Linnaeus in 1753. Linnaeus also described R. undulatum, but this is now considered to be the same species.

The name rha barbarum, Latin for 'foreign rha', was first used in the writings of Celsus, who uses the word to describe a valued medicinal root imported from the east.

== Description ==
=== Similar species ===
According to the 2003 key in the Flora of China, this species is distinguished from other entire-leaved rhubarbs in China with leaves having a wavy or crisped margin; R. wittrockii, R. webbianum, R. australe and R. hotaoense, by having less than 1 cm-sized fruit, yellow-white to greenish-white flowers, and the surface of the rachis of panicle covered in papilla. In many characters it is most similar to R. webbianum, and somewhat less so R. hotaoense.

=== Karyotypy ===
There have been at least two studies investigating the karyotypy of this species, both studies focussing on the synonym R. undulatum. Both 2n=22 and 2n=44 have been found. It is possible that this karyotypic diversity indicates the existence of one or more cryptic species, because the polyploid forms would essentially be reproductively isolated.

== Distribution ==
It is native to an area of southeastern Siberia in the Daurian region around and stretching east from Lake Baikal in Russia, and in northern Mongolia. In China, it occurs in the northern provinces of Hebei, Heilongjiang, Henan, Hubei, Jilin, Inner Mongolia, Shanxi and Shaanxi.

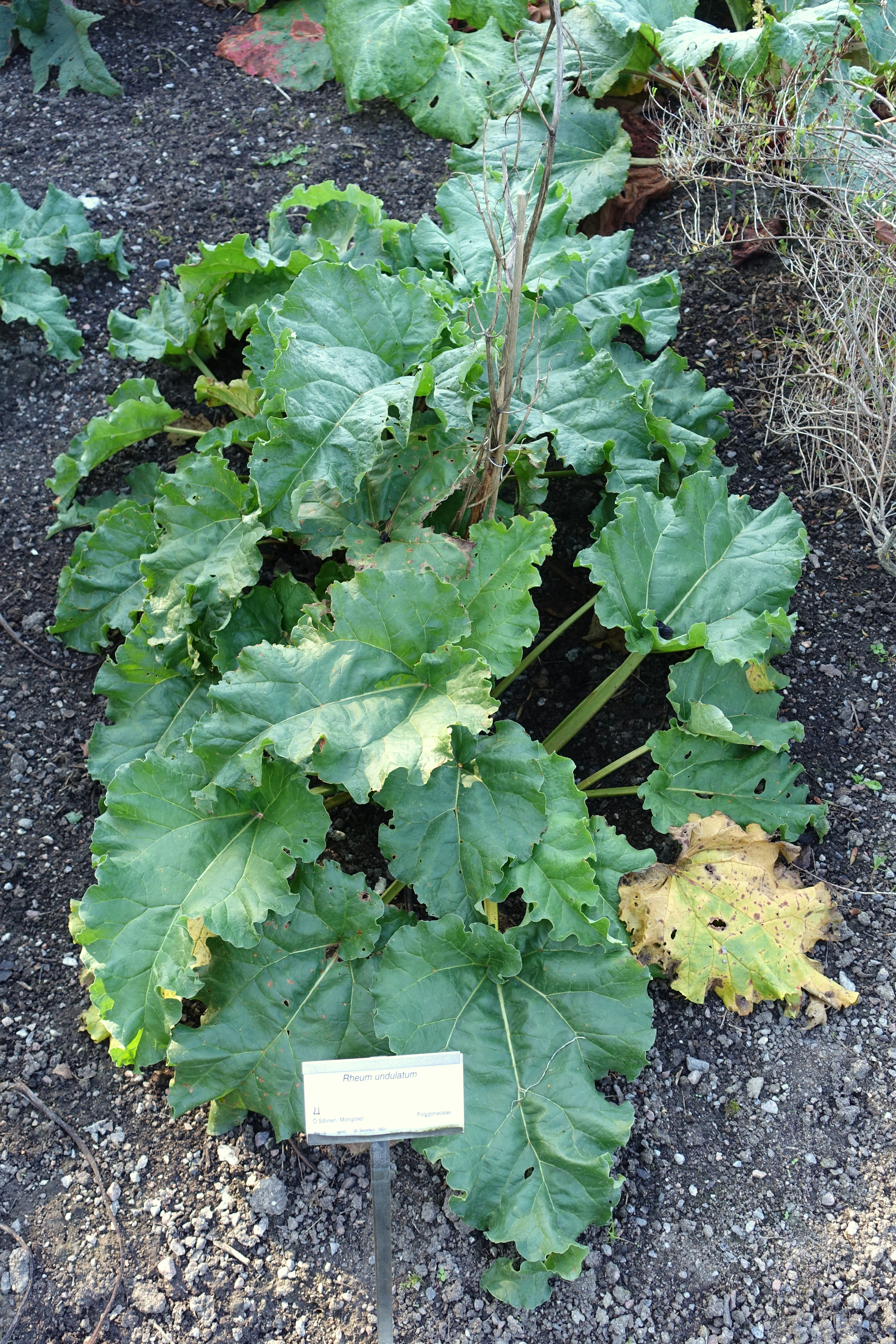
Rheum rhabarbarum growing in the Bergianska trädgården in Stockholm, Sweden

== Habitat & ecology ==
In China, it is known as a species growing on mountain slopes at 1,000–1,600 m elevation. In Russia it occurs in sandy ground along field edges, on the steppes, and in the regionally uncommon copses of woodland.

In China, it flowers in June, and has fruit after July.

Most documented insect relationships with this species are muddied by the misapplication of the name R. rhabarbarum to plants of R. × hybridum. As such, most of the insects which are said to use this species as a food plant are generalists from Europe or North America which did not actually eat this species nor are native to the region where this species occurs. An exception is the butterfly Lycaena violacea, whose caterpillars are only known to feed on R. rhabarbarum and whose range is concurrent with that of its host plant (most Lycaena spp. are specialised on Polygonaceae). Cosmia trapezina var. exigua is roughly native to some of the same areas, and its European variety has been found to have eaten rhubarb in Finland (it usually feeds on various tree species). Other species found to eat (garden) rhubarb which occur in the native range of this plant are Arctia caja, Hydraecia micacea, Spilarctia luteum and Xestia baja.

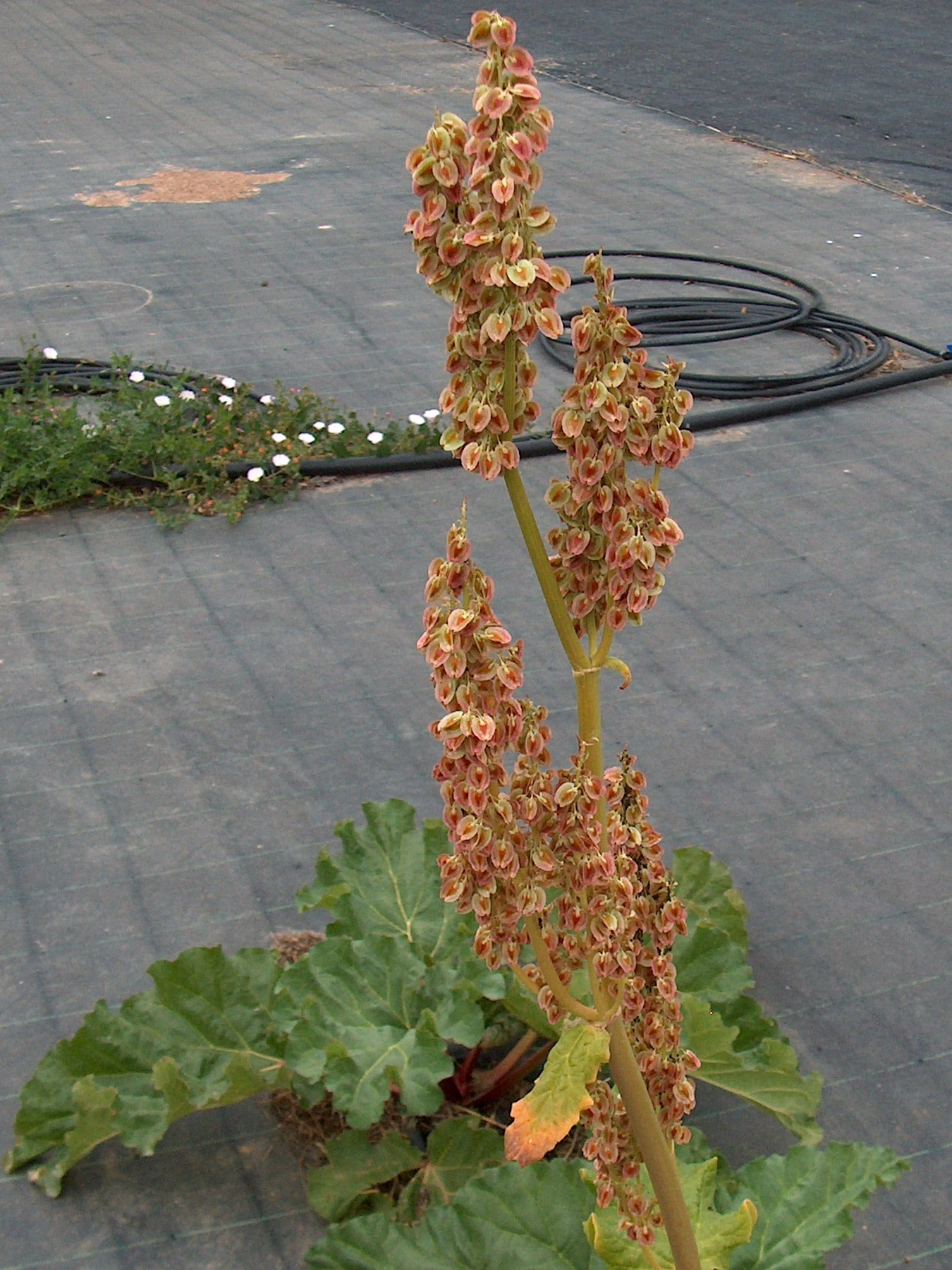
Fruit

== Cultivation ==
Rheum rhabarbarum (syn. R. undulatum) was one of a number of distinct species grown in Europe before the beginning of the 18th century. Initially the roots of a related species, possibly R. rhaponticum, were used for medicinal purposes. A putative hybrid of unknown origin, Rheum × hybridum, was also grown. The three taxa were grown as vegetable crops in England and Scandinavia by the early 18th century. They readily hybridize, and culinary rhubarb was developed by selecting open-pollinated seed, so that its precise origin is almost impossible to determine. In appearance, culinary rhubarb varies continuously between R. rhabarbarum and R. rhaponticum. Modern rhubarb cultivars are tetraploids with 2n = 44, in contrast to 2n=22 for the wild species such as R. rhaponticum.
