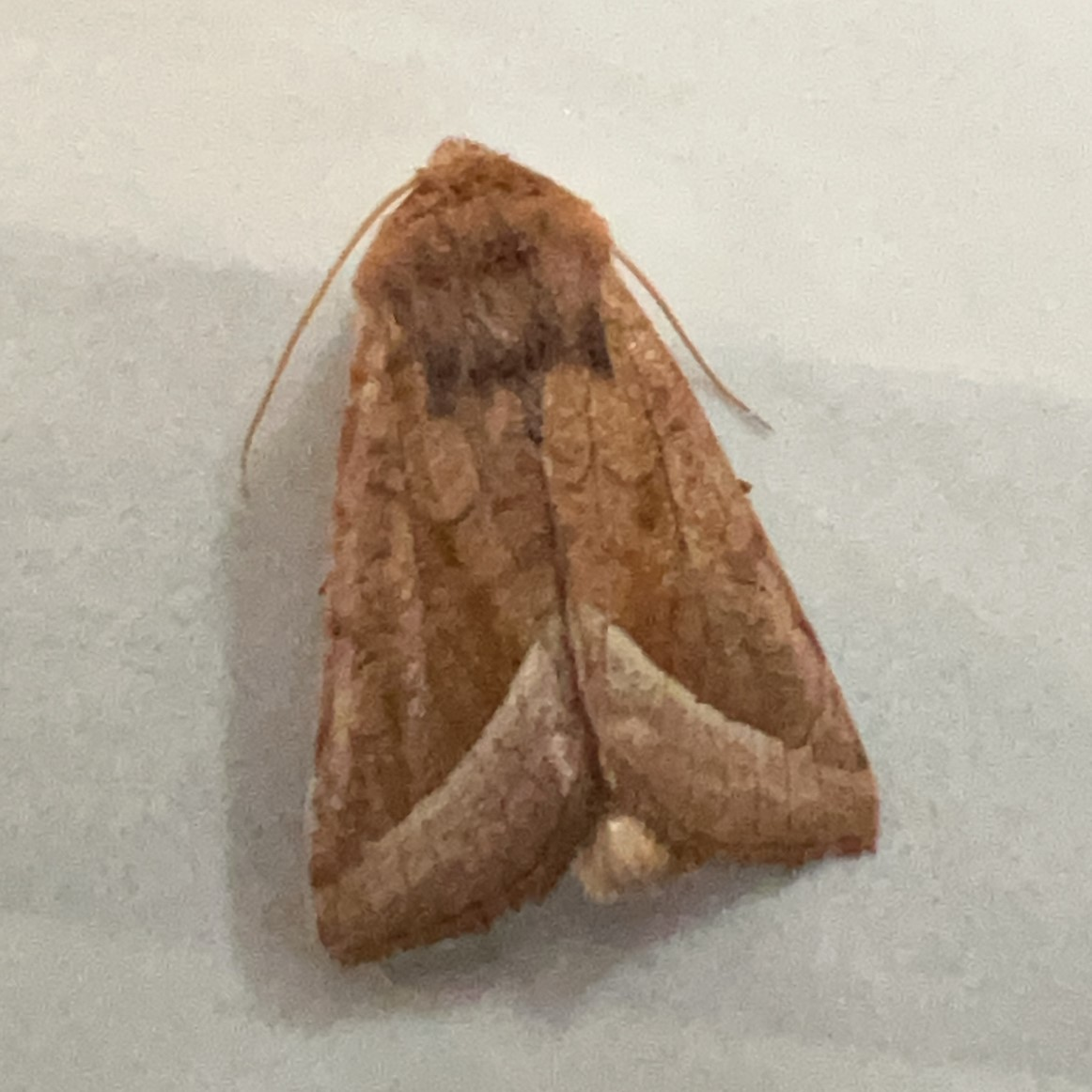

Scientific classification
- Kingdom: Animalia
- Phylum: Arthropoda
- Class: Insecta
- Order: Lepidoptera
- Superfamily: Noctuoidea
- Family: Noctuidae
- Tribe: Apameini
- Genus: Hydraecia
- Species: H. perobliqua

Binomial name
- Hydraecia perobliqua Hampson, 1910

= Hydraecia perobliqua =

Species of moth

Hydraecia perobliqua, the false rosy rustic moth, is a species of cutworm or dart moth in the family Noctuidae. It is found in North America.
