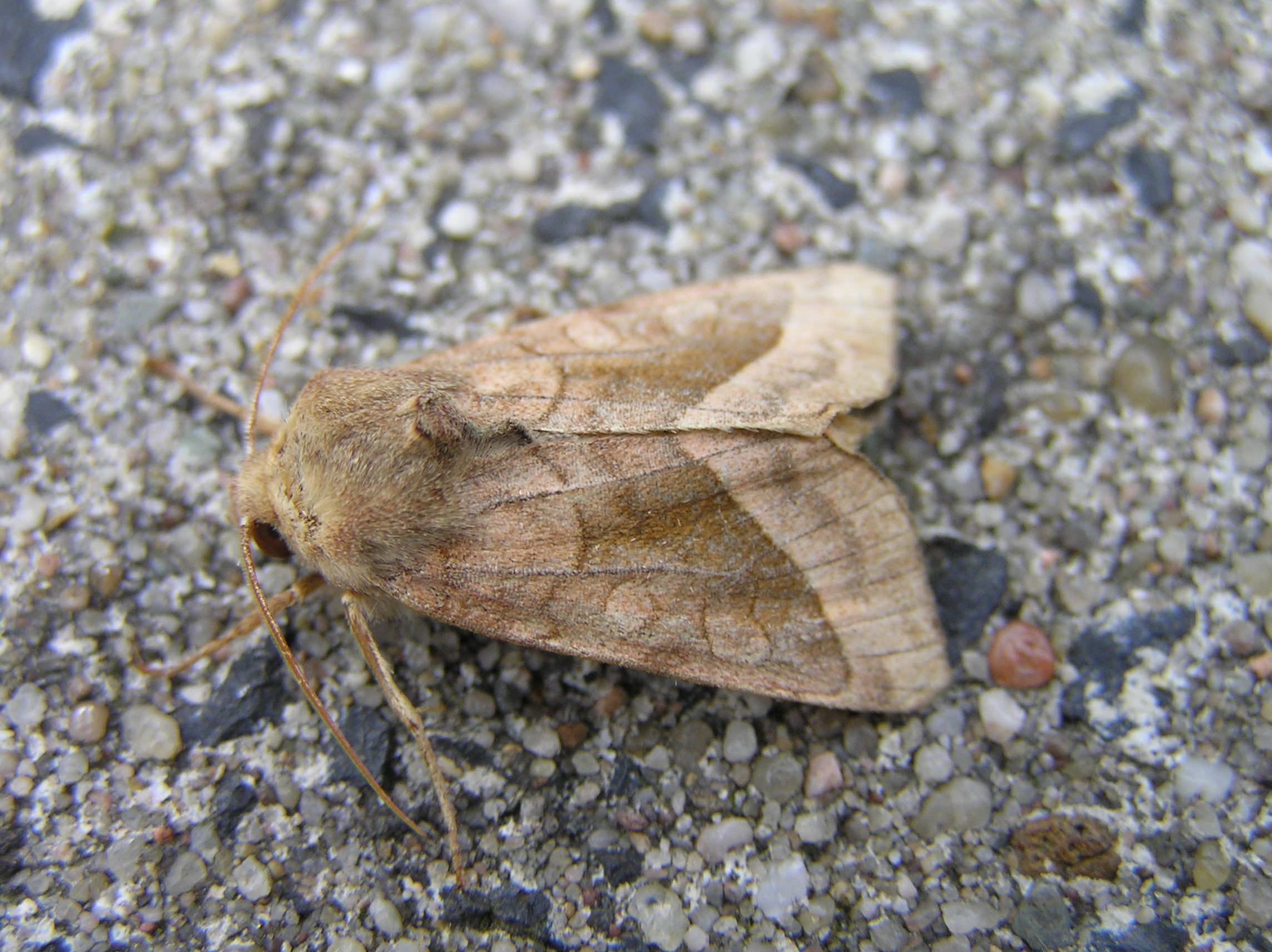
- Hydraecia micacea

Scientific classification
- Kingdom: Animalia
- Phylum: Arthropoda
- Class: Insecta
- Order: Lepidoptera
- Superfamily: Noctuoidea
- Family: Noctuidae
- Tribe: Apameini
- Genus: Hydraecia; Guenée, 1841

Species
- See text

= Hydraecia =

Genus of moths

Hydraecia is a genus of moths of the family Noctuidae.

== Species ==
The genus includes the following species:

- Hydraecia arnymai (Dyar, 1913)
- Hydraecia burkhana (Alphéraky, 1892)
- Hydraecia franzhoferi Gyulai, L. Ronkay & Saldaitis, 2011
- Hydraecia immanis Guenée, 1852
- Hydraecia intermedia (Barnes & Benjamin, 1924)
- Hydraecia lampadifera Walker, 1865
- Hydraecia medialis Smith, 1892
- Hydraecia micacea – Rosy Rustic (Esper, 1789)
- Hydraecia mongoliensis Urbahn, 1967
- Hydraecia naxiaoides Moore, 1867
- Hydraecia nordstroemi Horke, 1952
- Hydraecia obliqua (Harvey, 1876)
- Hydraecia osseola Staudinger, 1882
- Hydraecia perobliqua Hampson, 1910
- Hydraecia petasitis – Butterbur Doubleday, 1847
- Hydraecia songariae (Alphéraky, 1882)
- Hydraecia stramentosa Guenée, 1852
- Hydraecia terminata Varga & Ronkay, 1991
- Hydraecia ultima Holst, 1965
