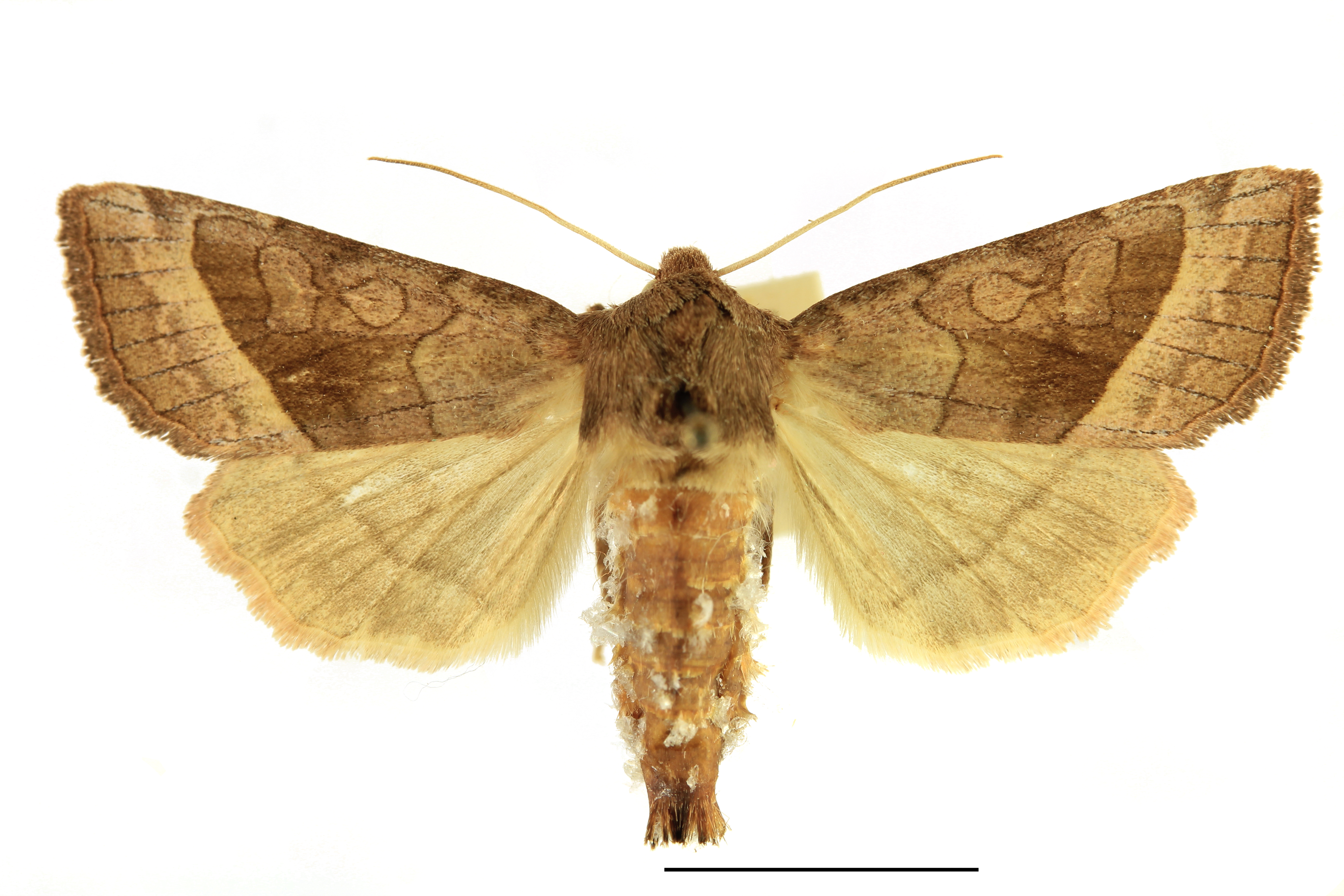

Scientific classification
- Domain: Eukaryota
- Kingdom: Animalia
- Phylum: Arthropoda
- Class: Insecta
- Order: Lepidoptera
- Superfamily: Noctuoidea
- Family: Noctuidae
- Genus: Hydraecia
- Species: H. nordstroemi

Binomial name
- Hydraecia nordstroemi Horke, 1952

= Hydraecia nordstroemi =

Species of moth

Hydraecia nordstroemi is a moth belonging to the family Noctuidae. The species was first described by Arvid Horke in 1952. It is very similar to Hydraecia micacea and Hydraecia ultima. Specimens can only be reliably identified and distinguished by a genital examination

It is native to Europe.
