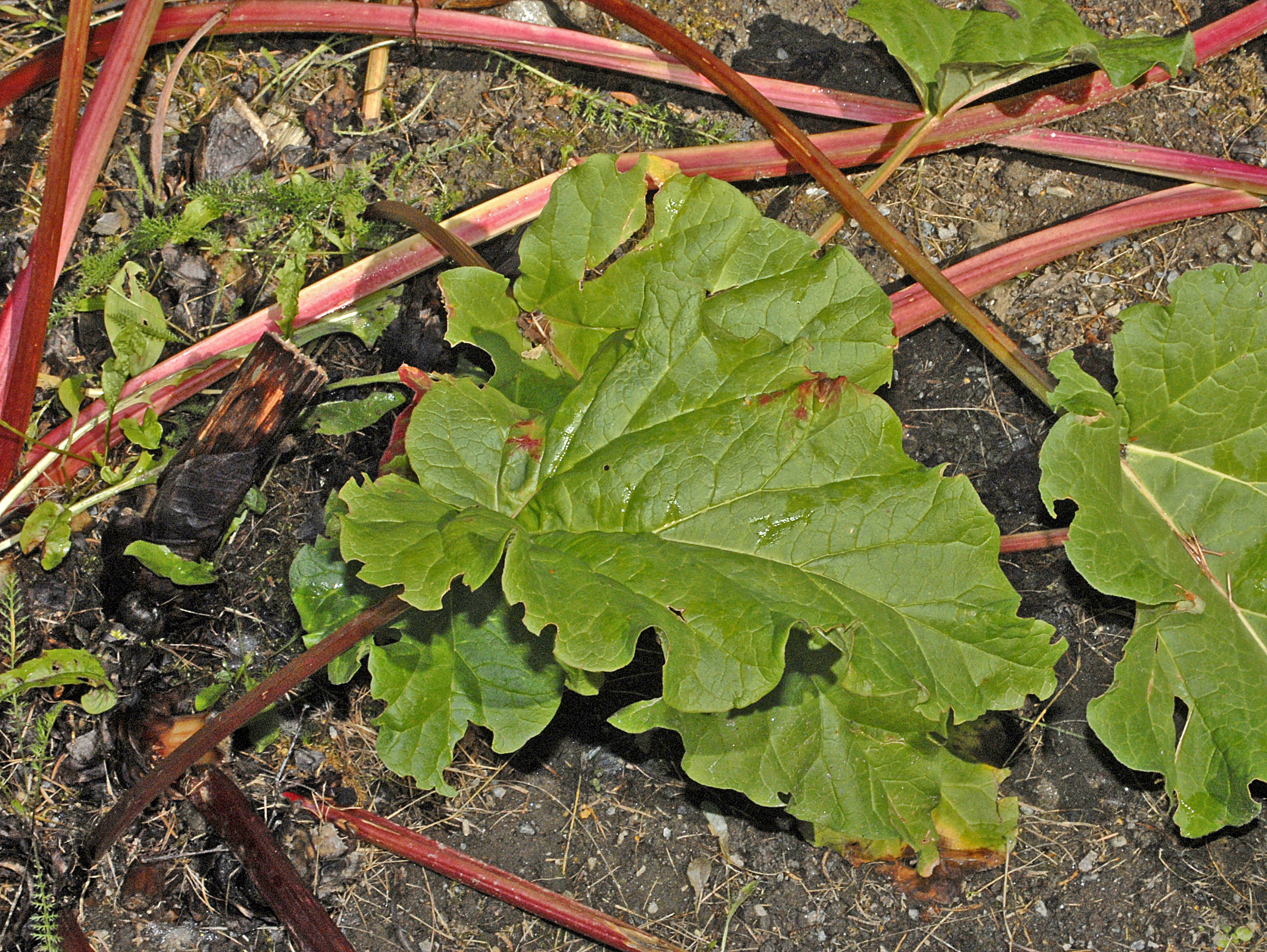
- Rheum webbianum at the Paradisia Alpine Botanical Garden

Scientific classification
- Kingdom: Plantae
- Clade: Tracheophytes
- Clade: Angiosperms
- Clade: Eudicots
- Order: Caryophyllales
- Family: Polygonaceae
- Genus: Rheum
- Species: R. webbianum

Binomial name
- Rheum webbianum Royle

Synonyms
- Rheum emodi Wall. ex Meisn.

= Rheum webbianum =

Species of plant

Rheum webbianum is a species of herbaceous perennial rhubarb-relative in the family Polygonaceae from the southwestern Himalayan region, known in (Indian) English as Indian rhubarb, Gilgiti rhubarb or small Himalayan rhubarb.

== Taxonomy ==
The species epithet honours Philip Barker Webb, a botanist from the 19th century.

The type is kept at the herbarium of the Liverpool Museum.

In the 1998 Flora Republicae popularis Sinicae A. R. Li classifies R. webbianum in section Rheum together with R. compactum, R. likiangense and R. wittrockii.

== Description ==
Habitus Rheum webbianum is a perennial herbaceous plant which grows from 0.3–2 metres (1 ft 0 in – 6 ft 7 in) in height. It has a stout, hollow stem bearing the inflorescence, this is finely sulcate (with many fine fissures in profile) and glabrous (hairless) or covered in papilla (papilliferous) on the surface of its upper part.

This plant is very variable, especially in the leaf size and plant height.

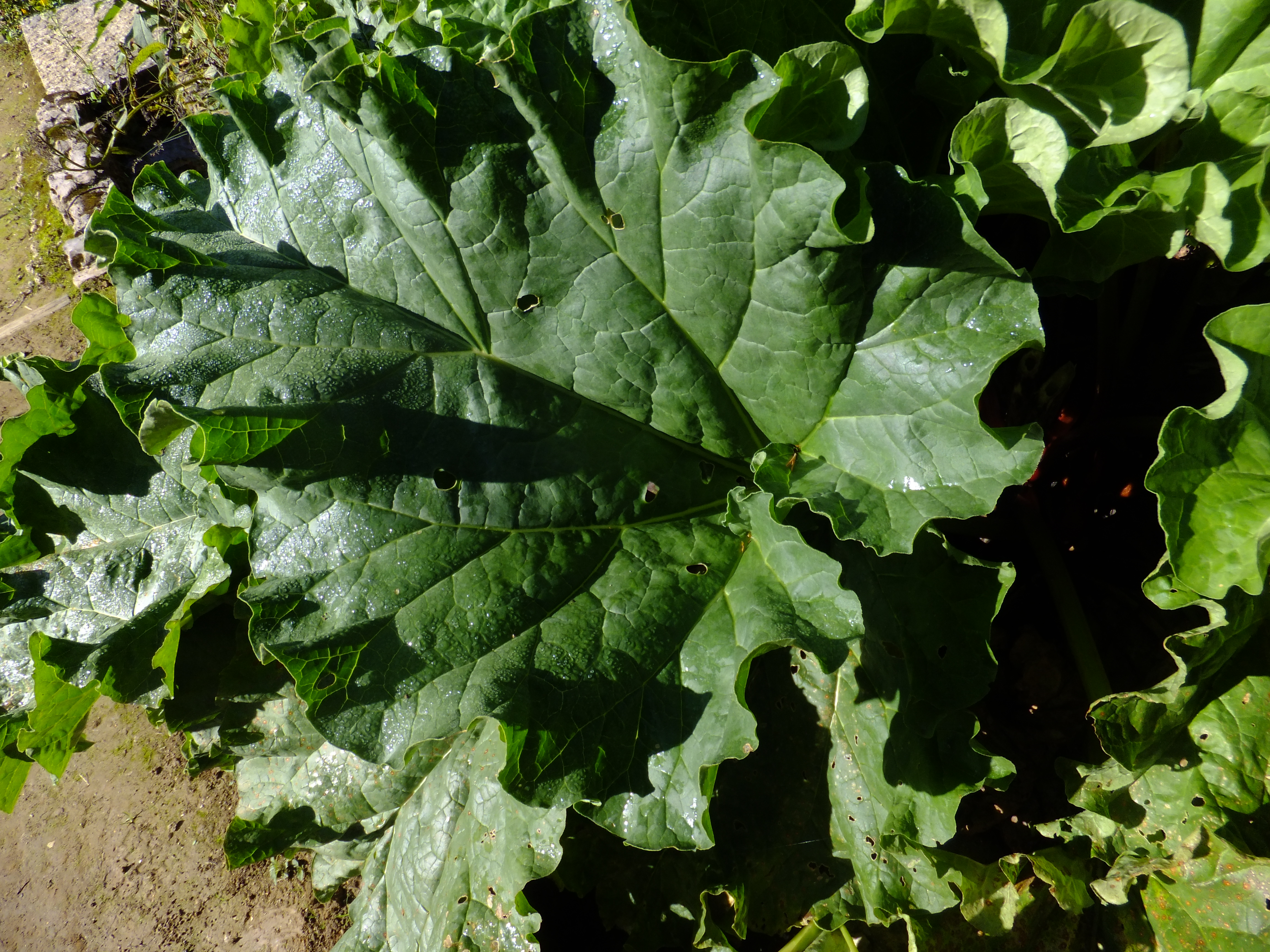
Leaf of Rheum webbianum in the Giardino Botanico Alpino Viote.

Leaves It has a stout, 30–45 centimetres (12–18 in) long petiole on its basal leaves which is shorter than blade and papilliferous. Leaves are leathery, and green on the upper side and muricate on the lower, or papillose or glabrous. The shape of the leaf blade is entire, orbicular, cordate (heart-shaped), reniform-cordate to reniform (kidney-shaped) in shape, 10–60 centimetres (3.9–23.6 in) long (more usually 20–25 centimetres (7.9–9.8 in)), from 10–50 centimetres (3.9–19.7 in) (more usually 25–30 centimetres (9.8–11.8 in)) wide, and with the blade shorter than wide. The leaf blade has five to 7, nearly basal, main veins. The apex (tip) of the leaf blade is obtuse (rounded) or subacute (slightly pointed), the margin is slightly sinuolate (wavy), and the base is broadly cordate. The upper leaves on the inflorescence stem are smaller and are ovate in shape.

Flowers The inflorescence is a large, diffusely branched (once or twice), densely-flowered panicle up to 1m tall, with the flower clusters usually axillary, less commonly terminal (at the end of the racemes). The small flowers have no bracts, are pale yellowish in colour, have a diameter of 2–2.5 millimetres (0.079–0.098 in), have a filiform (wiry), 3-5mm long pedicel which is jointed below middle, and have elliptic-shaped tepals.

Fruit The winged fruit is notched (slightly retuse) on both ends; the wings are broad, approximately 3.5mm wide, and with longitudinal veins near their margins. The fruit is broadly oblong/ellipsoid or orbicular in shape, 8-12mm across, approximately as long as wide. The seeds are narrowly ovoid-ellipsoid in shape, approximately 4mm wide.

Karyotypy R. webbianum populations apparently are found in both diploid and tetraploid forms, having a chromosome count of 2n=22 or 2n=44. It is suspected that this infraspecific karyotypic diversity indicates the existence of one or more cryptic species, despite the different forms being phenotypically identical, because the polyploid forms would essentially be reproductively isolated.

=== Similar species ===
According to the 2003 key in the Flora of China, this species is distinguished from other entire-leaved rhubarbs in China with leaves having a wavy or crisped margin; R. wittrockii, R. rhabarbarum, R. australe and R. hotaoense, by having less than 1 cm-sized fruit, yellow-white flowers, and a wider than long leaf blade with a reniform-cordate to cordate shape. In many characters, it is most similar to R. rhabarbarum and R. hotaoense.

== Distribution ==
This species is present in Pakistan (Gilgit-Baltistan, Khyber-Pakhtunkhwa), India (Kashmir, Uttarakhand), western Nepal and southwest Tibet.

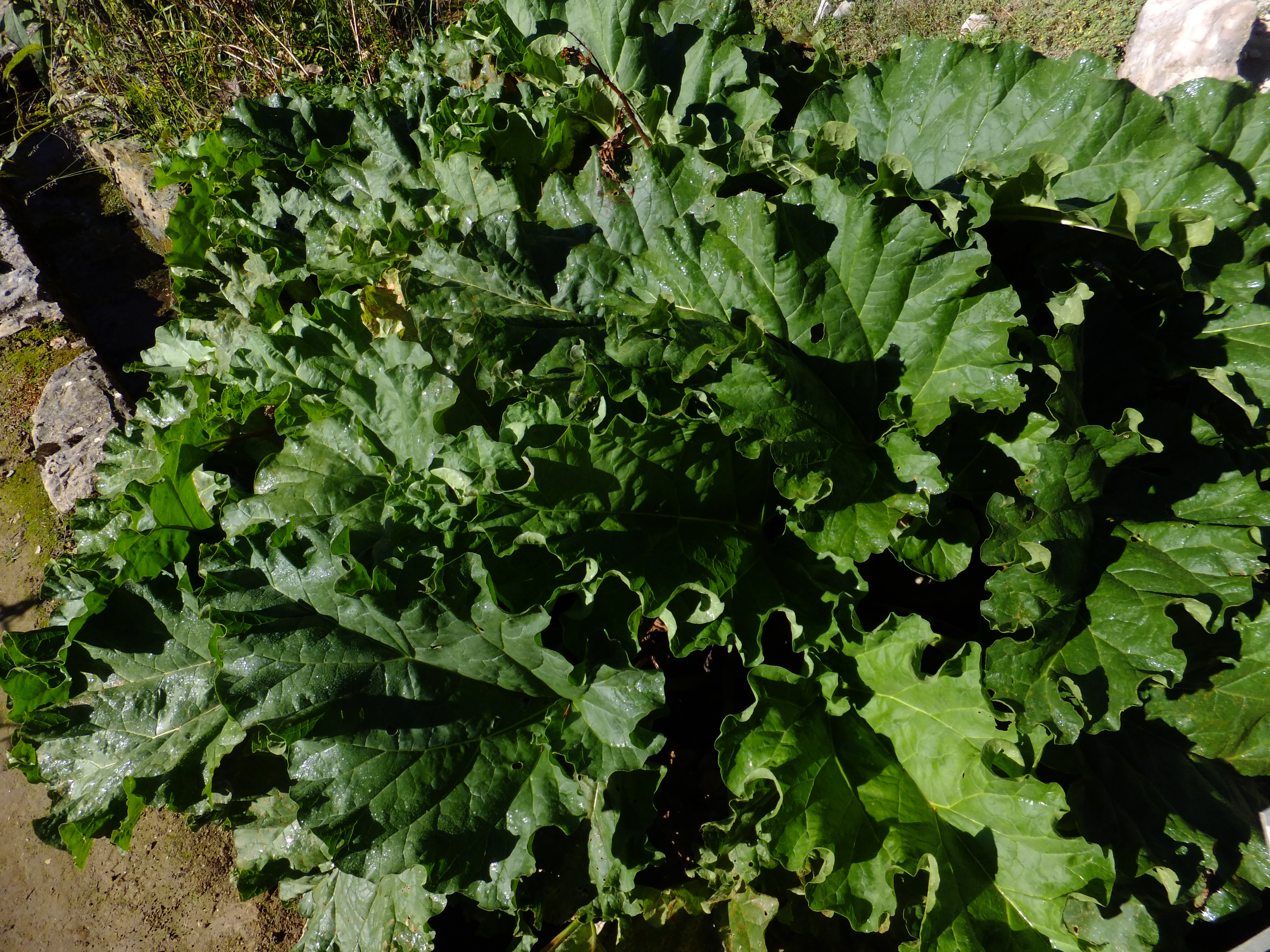
Rheum webbianum habitus

It is very common in the Himalayas.

== Ecology ==
=== Habitat ===
In Pakistan it grows on slopes at an elevation of 2,000–4,500 metres (6,600–14,800 ft) above sea level. In Tibet it is known from slopes at 3500-3600m elevation. In Nepal it grows at altitudes of 2400-4200m. In India it is known from elevations of 2400-4300m.

=== Life cycle ===
It flowers extending from June through September in Pakistan. It flowers June to July in India. It fruits August to September in Tibet.

== Local names ==
In Pakistan it is known as chotal in the Gilgit region, and ishpar in the Chitral valley. An Urdu name is ravand chini. In Hindi it is called the following names: hind-revand-chini (Indian rhubarb), archa or atis. In Marathi it is known as ladakirevanda-chini. It is called padam chalnu in Nepal. In Chinese it is known as 须弥大黄, xu mi da huang.

== Uses ==
Like Rheum australe, the roots of this species are harvested from the wild to make the drug Indian rhubarb; this was formerly an important drug in Western medicine, and is still used in Unani medicine.

In Pakistan locals eat the leaf stalk cooked as in the West. The root is used as a purgative. In the Chitral valley the stems of the unripe inflorescence and leaf stalks are also eaten raw for the taste. Poor children collect the plant from the wild to sell in the market for money.
