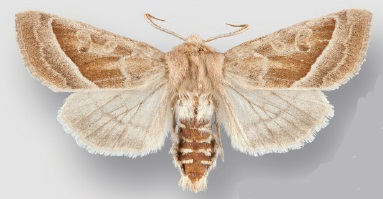
- Male
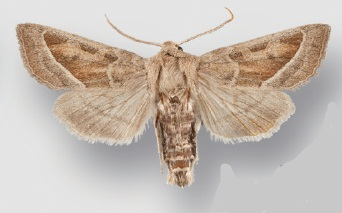
- Male

Scientific classification
- Domain: Eukaryota
- Kingdom: Animalia
- Phylum: Arthropoda
- Class: Insecta
- Order: Lepidoptera
- Superfamily: Noctuoidea
- Family: Noctuidae
- Genus: Hydraecia
- Species: H. medialis

Binomial name
- Hydraecia medialis (Smith, 1892)

Synonyms
- Hydroecia medialis Smith, 1892; Hydroecia pallescens Smith, 1899; Hydraecia pallescens

= Hydraecia medialis =

Species of moth

Hydraecia medialis is a moth in the family Noctuidae. It is found in western North America. East of the Cascades, it occurs as far north as the Cariboo region in south-central British Columbia. The range extends across the Rocky Mountains in Montana and then spreads north and south on the Great Plains to reach Alberta, the western Dakotas and northern New Mexico. The habitat consists of open ponderosa pine forests, drier sagebrush steppe and juniper woodlands.

The length of the forewings is 16–24 mm. Adults are pale gray-tan with a darker, often reddish, median area, a thick red-brown or brown and white postmedial line, and pale-filled spots. The hindwings are pale yellow-tan with variable gray suffusion. Adults are on wing from mid August to September.

The larvae probably bore into the stems and roots of Lupinus species.
