= Rhein (molecule) =

- Chemical structure of rhein

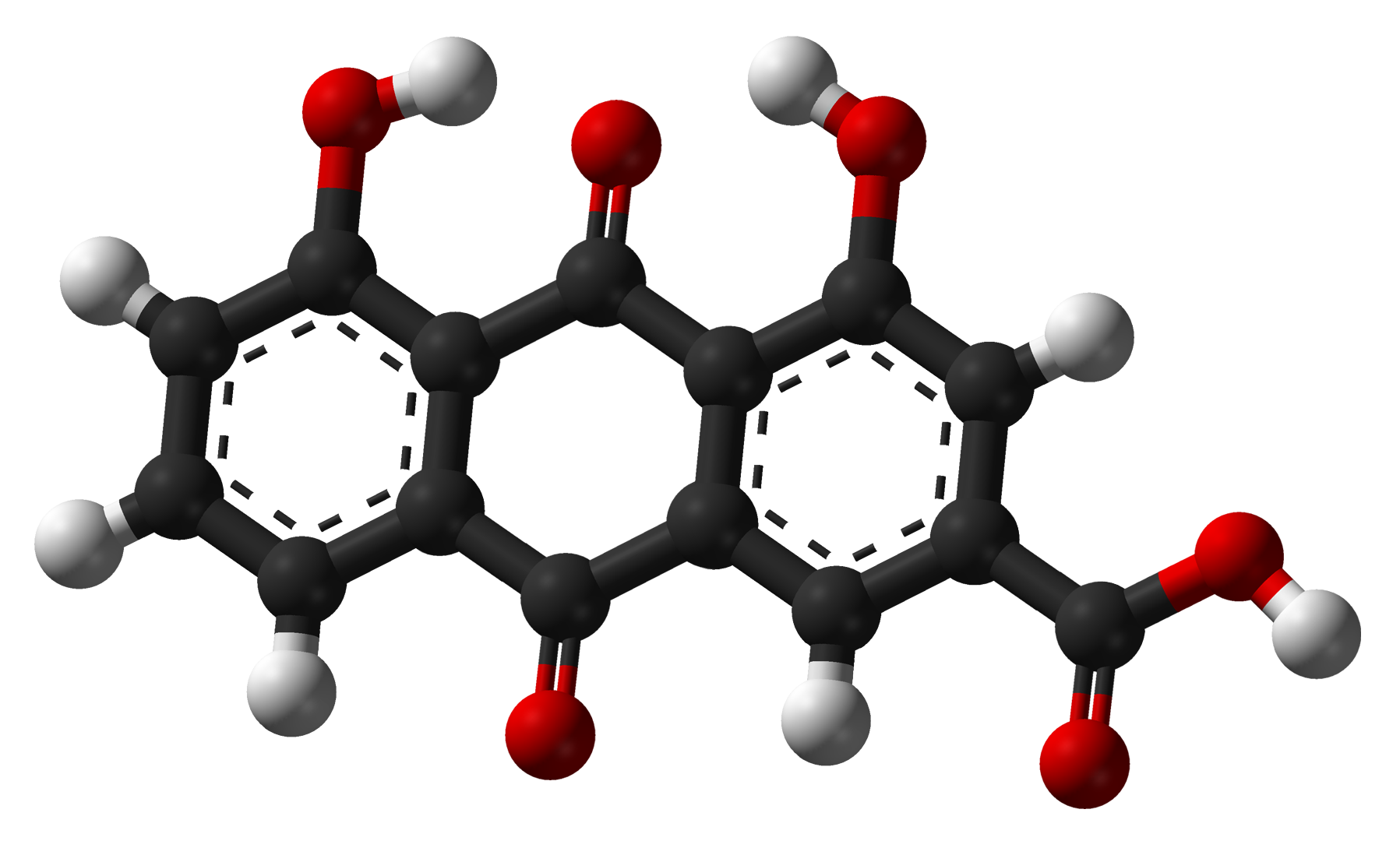
- Ball-and-stick model of rhein

Names
- Preferred IUPAC name 4,5-Dihydroxy-9,10-dioxo-9,10-dihydroanthracene-2-carboxylic acid
- Other names Rhubarb Yellow; Monorhein; Cassic acid Rheic acid Chrysazin-3-carboxylic acid

Identifiers
CAS Number	478-43-3
3D model (JSmol)	Interactive image
ChEBI	CHEBI:8825
ChEMBL	ChEMBL418068
ChemSpider	9762
DrugBank	DB13174
ECHA InfoCard	100.006.839
EC Number	207-521-4
KEGG	C10401
MeSH	Rhein
PubChem CID	10168
UNII	YM64C2P6UX
CompTox Dashboard (EPA)	DTXSID4026000
- InChI: InChI=1S/C15H8O6/c16-9-3-1-2-7-11(9)14(19)12-8(13(7)18)4-6(15(20)21)5-10(12)17/h1-5,16-17H,(H,20,21) Key: FCDLCPWAQCPTKC-UHFFFAOYSA-N; InChI=1/C15H8O6/c16-9-3-1-2-7-11(9)14(19)12-8(13(7)18)4-6(15(20)21)5-10(12)17/h1-5,16-17H,(H,20,21) Key: FCDLCPWAQCPTKC-UHFFFAOYAT
- SMILES: C1=CC2=C(C(=C1)O)C(=O)C3=C(C=C(C=C3C2=O)C(=O)O)O

Properties
Chemical formula	C_{15}H_{8}O_{6}
Molar mass	284.22 g/mol
Appearance	Orange crystals
Density	1.687 g/cm^{3}
Melting point	350 to 352 °C (662 to 666 °F; 623 to 625 K)
Boiling point	597.8 °C (1,108.0 °F; 870.9 K) at 760 mmHg
Solubility in water	Insoluble in water

Hazards
- Occupational safety and health (OHS/OSH)
Main hazards	Irritant
- GHS labelling
Pictograms	(GHS07: Exclamation mark)
Signal word	Warning
Hazard statements	H315, H319, H335
Flash point	329.4 °C (624.9 °F; 602.5 K)
- Except where otherwise noted, data are given for materials in their standard state (at 25 °C [77 °F], 100 kPa). verify (what is ?) Infobox references

Rhein, also known as cassic acid, is a substance in the anthraquinone group obtained from rhubarb. Like all such substances, rhein is a cathartic, which is commonly found as a glycoside such as rhein-8-glucoside or glucorhein. Rhein was first isolated in 1895. It is found in rhubarb species like Rheum undulatum and Rheum palmatum as well as in Cassia reticulata.

Originally the rhubarb plant which contains rhein was used as a laxative. It was believed that rhein along with other anthraquinone glycosides imparted this activity.

Rhein has been reevaluated as an antibacterial agent against Staphylococcus aureus in 2008. Synergy or partial synergy has been demonstrated between rhein and the antibiotics oxacillin and ampicillin.

Rhein has been shown to inhibit the fat mass and obesity-associated protein, an enzyme responsible for removing the methylation from N^{6}-methyladenosine in nucleic acids.

The pharmacokinetics of rhein have not been intensively studied in humans, but at least one study in healthy male volunteers found that rhein was better absorbed from oral administration of rhubarb than from a retention enema. Rhein (at an oral dose of 50 mg twice per day) was shown to be safe when administered for five days to elderly patients with chronic congestive heart failure.

== See also ==
- Diacerein
