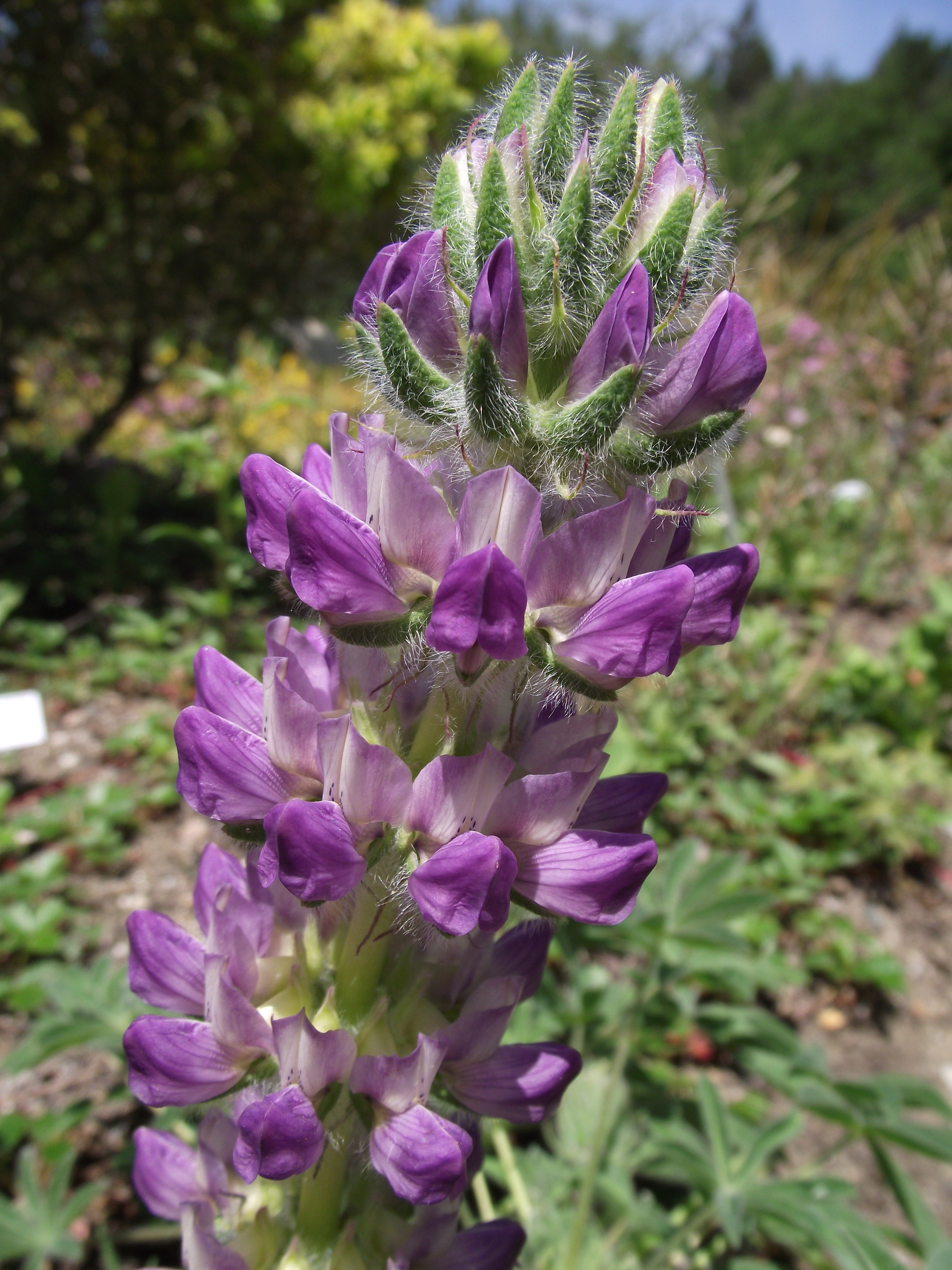
- Lupinus microcarpus var. microcarpus

Scientific classification
- Kingdom: Plantae
- Clade: Tracheophytes
- Clade: Angiosperms
- Clade: Eudicots
- Clade: Rosids
- Order: Fabales
- Family: Fabaceae
- Subfamily: Faboideae
- Genus: Lupinus
- Species: L. microcarpus

Binomial name
- Lupinus microcarpus Sims

= Lupinus microcarpus =

Species of legume

Lupinus microcarpus, the wide-bannered lupine or chick lupine, is a species of lupine native to western North America from southwestern British Columbia south through Oregon and California, including the Mojave Desert, and into Baja California. There is also a disjunct population in South America, with locations in central Chile and western Argentina.

== Description ==
Lupinus microcarpus is an annual plant growing to 80-centimetre (31 in) tall. The leaves are palmately compound with 5-11 leaflets 1-centimetre (0.39 in)–5-centimetre (2.0 in) long and up to 1-centimetre (0.39 in) broad.

The flowers are generally pink to purple in color, but can also be between white and yellow; they are produced in open whorls on an erect spike.

Lupinus microcarpus grows from sea level in the north of its range, up to 1,600-metre (5,200 ft) high in Southern California.

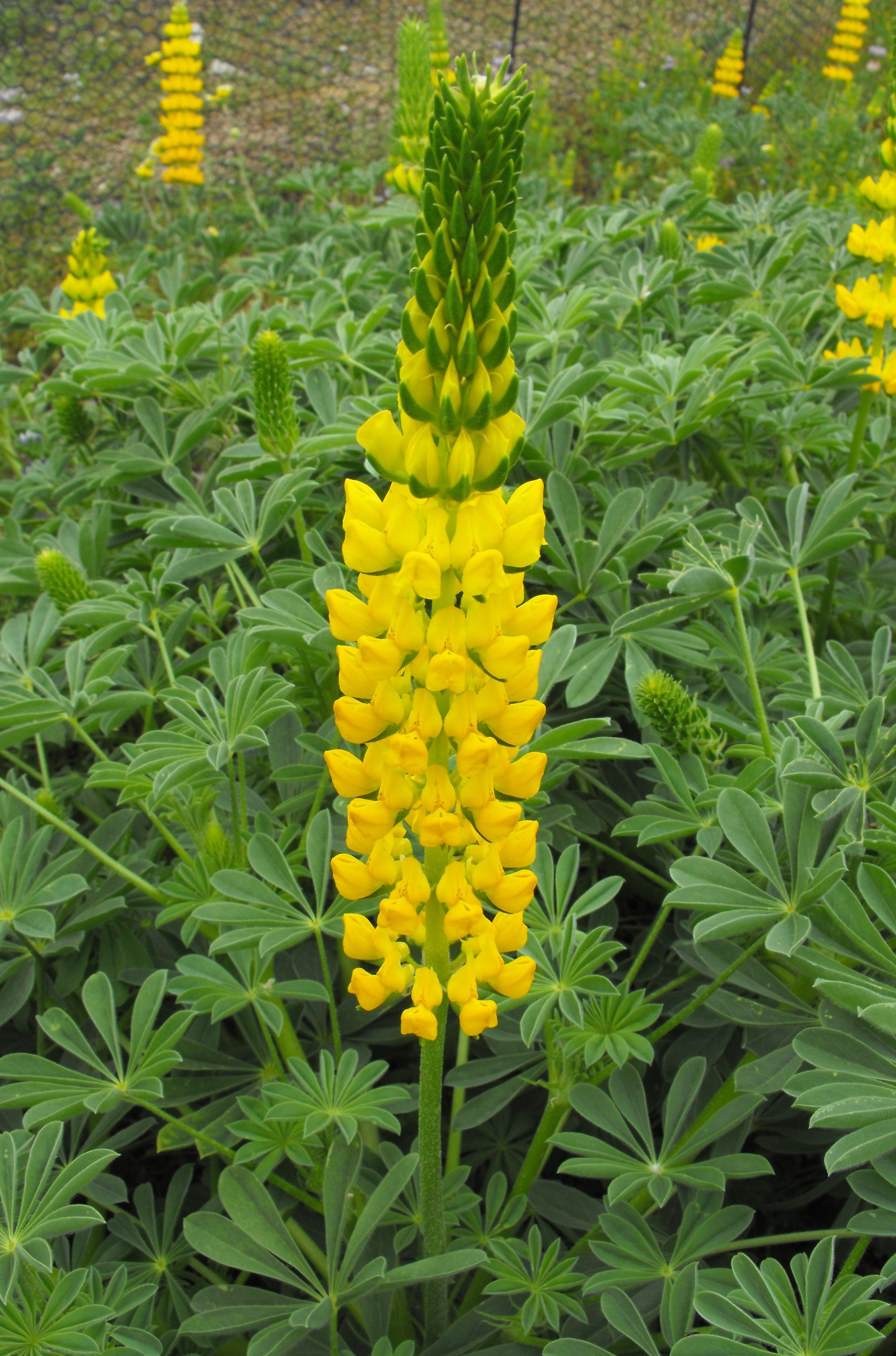
Lupinus microcarpus var. densiflorus

== Varieties ==
There are three named botanical varieties:

- Lupinus microcarpus var. densiflorus - whitewhorl lupine or dense-flowered lupine. Endemic and restricted to western California (formerly Lupinus densiflorus).
- Lupinus microcarpus var. horizontalis. Endemic and restricted to southeastern California deserts.
- Lupinus microcarpus var. microcarpus. Widespread, British Columbia to Chile.

== Phytoremediation waste management ==
Chilean scientists (Universidad de Santiago de Chile) studying phytoremediation waste management in the city of Antofagasta, discovered that plants are capable of absorbing arsenic from the soil.
