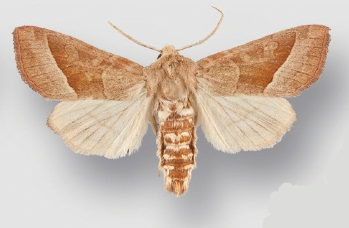
- Male
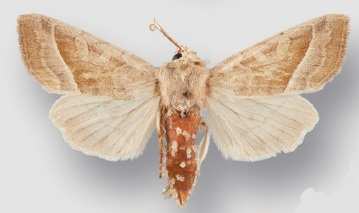
- Male

Scientific classification
- Kingdom: Animalia
- Phylum: Arthropoda
- Class: Insecta
- Order: Lepidoptera
- Superfamily: Noctuoidea
- Family: Noctuidae
- Genus: Hydraecia
- Species: H. obliqua

Binomial name
- Hydraecia obliqua (Harvey, 1876)

Synonyms
- Gortyna obliqua Harvey 1876; Gortyna ximena Barnes & Benjamin, 1924; Hydraecia ximena; Gortyna columbia Barnes & Benjamin, 1924; Hydraecia columbia

= Hydraecia obliqua =

Species of moth

Hydraecia obliqua is a moth in the family Noctuidae first described by Leon F. Harvey in 1876. It is found in western North America, east to the Sierra Nevada in California and the crest of the Cascade Range in Oregon and Washington. It occurs continuously on the coast north to south-western British Columbia, with a disjunct northern population at Terrace, British Columbia. The habitat consists of the riparian zone along creeks and rivers of coastal rainforests, as well as oak savanna, mixed hardwood forests and valley grasslands.

The length of the forewings is 16–24 mm. The forewings are warm orange brown, varying considerably in darkness from dark brown on the California Coast, lighter orange brown in the Pacific Northwest and pale yellow brown in the Sierra Nevada. The hindwing is pale with a yellow tint, usually with dark veins and a gray suffusion in the submarginal area.

The larvae probably bore into the stems and roots of herbaceous vegetation. Larvae have been recorded feeding on Lupinus species.
