= Hydroxyanthracene =

Chemical structure of sennoside A.

Hydroxyanthracenes are a class of natural phenolic compounds. They can be found in Cassia alata and Cassia senna (sennosides A, B, C and D).

Quinizarin is one of the most common synthetic hydroxyanthacenes.
