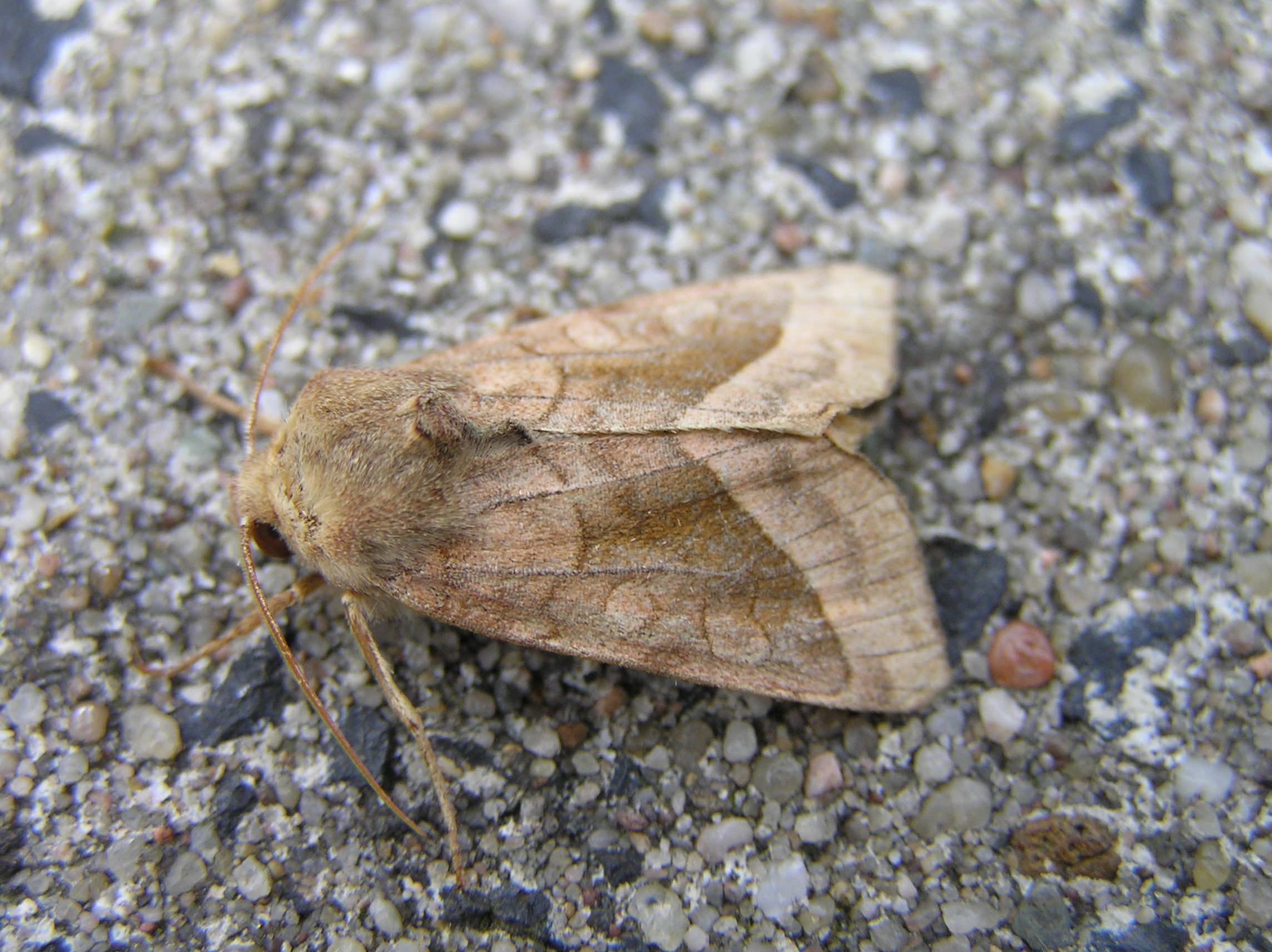

Scientific classification
- Domain: Eukaryota
- Kingdom: Animalia
- Phylum: Arthropoda
- Class: Insecta
- Order: Lepidoptera
- Superfamily: Noctuoidea
- Family: Noctuidae
- Genus: Hydraecia
- Species: H. micacea

Binomial name
- Hydraecia micacea (Esper, 1789)

= Hydraecia micacea =

Species of moth

Hydraecia micacea, the rosy rustic, is a moth of the family Noctuoidea. It is found across the Palearctic realm from Ireland to Siberia (except the southern areas). It reaches Japan and is introduced to eastern USA, Quebec and Ottawa.

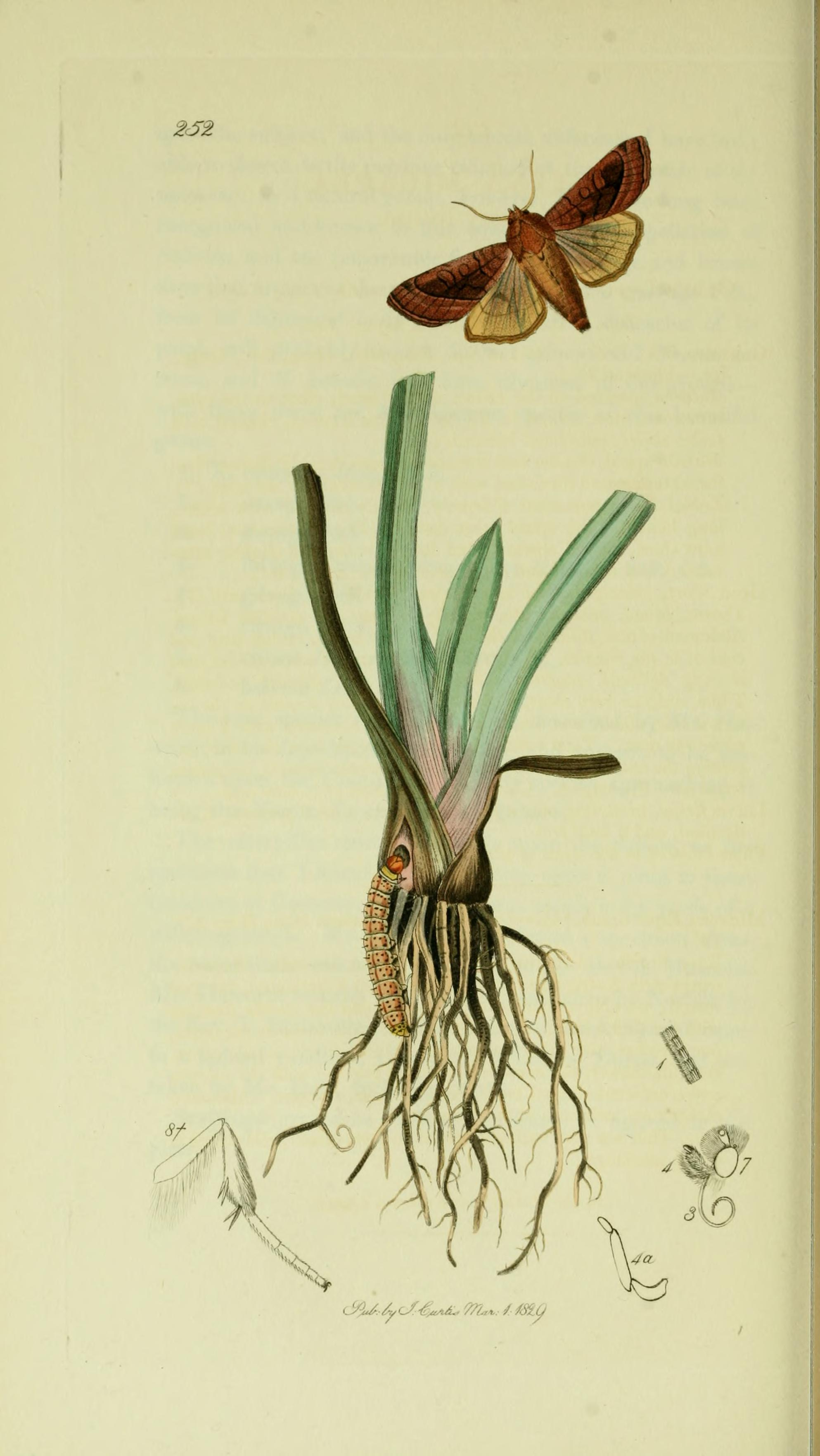
Illustration from John Curtis's British Entomology Volume 5

== Technical description and variation ==
Forewing pale greyish ochreous, or dark grey, or brownish grey with strong rufous tinge; the median area darker, suffused with olive brownish, except along costa and inner margin, especially between median shade and outer line, the paler ground colour showing only in the terminal third; inner and outer lines brown; the inner excurved below middle, the outer oblique inwards, curved only below costa, generally followed by a paler, sometimes whitish line; upper stigmata large, of the ground colour, with fine brown outline; a dark median shade; submarginal line very variable, sometimes preceded by a dark shade, sometimes also followed by the same, in other cases hardly visible, sharply angled on vein 7, above which it is preceded by a dark costal patch; veins towards termen dark; hindwing luteous, generally grey-tinged, with a dark outer line and submarginal cloud; the typical form is brownish grey tinged with rosy; — the paler, more ochreous, forms, with very little red in them are ab. grisea Tutt; the dark olive grey, also without the red flush, are ab. brunnea Tutt. The wingspan is 28–45 mm. The length of the forewings is 14–21 mm.

== Similar species ==
micaceais very similar to two other Hydraecia species found in Europe, whose distribution areas partly overlap with it: Hydraecia ultima and Hydraecia nordstroemi. Specimens can only be reliably identified and distinguished by a genital examination. micaceais very similar to two other Hydraecia species found in Europe, whose distribution areas partly overlap with it: Hydraecia ultima and Hydraecia nordstroemi. Specimens can only be reliably identified and distinguished by a genital examination.

== Biology ==
The moth flies in one generation from early July to November..

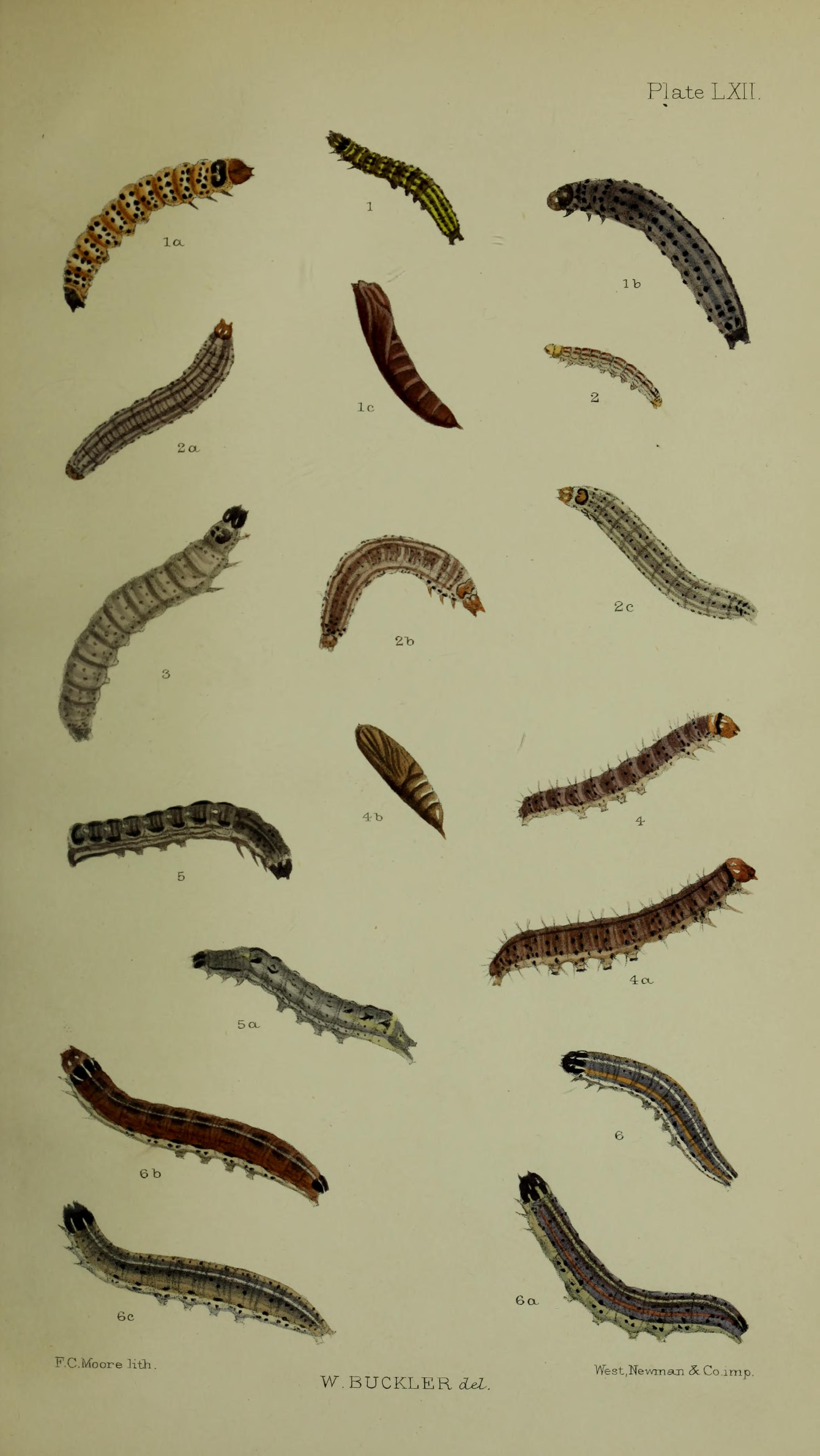
Fig. 4 larva after last moult

Larva reddish flesh colour; dorsal line deeper; sides more yellowish, the lateral line above the feet dotted with black; tubercles and spiracles black; thoracic and anal plates yellowish; head shining red brown. The larvae feed on a wide variety of herbaceous plants, including potato.

== Notes ==
1. The flight season refers to Belgium and The Netherlands. This may vary in other parts of the range.
