= Rheum lhasaense =

Scientific classification
- Kingdom: Plantae
- Clade: Tracheophytes
- Clade: Angiosperms
- Clade: Eudicots
- Order: Caryophyllales
- Family: Polygonaceae
- Genus: Rheum
- Species: R. lhasaense

Binomial name
- Rheum lhasaense A.J. Li & P.K. Hsiao

Species of plant

Rheum lhasaense is a plant from eastern Tibet belonging to the genus Rheum in family Polygonaceae. It is a mid-sized rhubarb species with triangular leaves and spherical fruit.

== Taxonomy ==
The species was first collected in 1965, but first described as a new species in 1983 in the Flora Xizangica.

The holotype was collected in 1965 by 张永田 郎楷永, held by the PE herbarium in Xiangshan, and is numbered PE-884218-00000017.

== Description ==
It is a herbaceous perennial plant growing to 30–70 cm high. The stems are usually glabrous (hairless), but sometimes pubescent at the nodes, and 7-10mm in diameter near the base of plant.

The basal leaves have a 3–7 cm long petiole which is subterete in profile, and having a surface covered in numerous papilla. The leaves are of a narrowly triangular or triangular-ovate, rarely narrowly ovate, shape. These leaves are 8–20 in length, 6–13 cm in width, with an upper surface glabrous and the lower with short hispid hairs, with five main veins branching from the base and with a slightly wavy (sinuolate) margin (edge). The base of these leaves is cordate and they end in an obtuse (dull) or acute (sharp) apex (point).

There are 1 or 2 small leaves on the stem (of the inflorescence) which have very tiny petioles with a short and membranous ochrea.

The plant flowers in narrow greenish-purple panicles which branch in two only on the lower part of the inflorescence. There are very small bracts between the flowers. These flowers have a 2.5-3mm pedicel which is jointed below its middle. The tepals are broadly ovate in shape and coloured light green with a purple margin.

The 8-9mm in diameter fruit is round with two small wings at its sides. These wings are narrow, 1.5-2mm wide, and have longitudinal veins near their middle. The seeds are round to oval-shaped and around 5mm in diameter, making them large for a rhubarb species.

=== Similar species ===
According to the 2003 key in the Flora of China, this species is distinguishable from other large-fruited species of Rheum: R. forrestii, R. likiangense and R. compactum, by having triangular-shaped leaves and purplish flowers, the others having white or yellowish flowers, and different shaped, never triangular, leaves.

In the key in the 1989 Plants of Central Asia it is compared with R. pumilum, from which it chiefly differs by being larger in all aspects.

== Distribution ==
Initially it was only known to occur at a few sites near the city of Lhasa in eastern Tibet, China, where it grows on grassy slopes at 4200-4600m elevation, perhaps higher. In 2004 it was collected in Riwoqê County in far eastern Tibet.

== Ecology ==
It flowers from July to August, and fruits from September to October.

== Local names ==
It is known as qu zha in Tibet. In Chinese it is known as 拉萨大黄, la sa da huang.

== Uses ==
It is inedible, but the roots are used in local Tibetian tradition as a medicinal plant for stomach aches. Uniquely, the roots of this species contain no trace of the anthraquinones for which other medicinal species of rhubarb popular in China are known for (such as R. palmatum or R. officinale). It does, however, contain a number of different chemicals known as resveratrol oligomers which may possibly have some future commercial use in the herbal supplement market as antioxidants, although the antioxidant activity is moderate to low. Two of these resveratrol oligomers are thus far (as of 2013) unique to this species. A Chinese patent was granted in 2014 for the use of these two chemicals to "reducing blood fat".

In Chinese traditional medicine it is an ingredient in qingpeng ointment, a Tibetan ointment which is used for arthritis and eczema, amongst a number of other things.
