= Chinese rhubarb =

Chinese rhubarb (Chinese: 大黄) can mean either of two species of rhubarb, genus Rheum:

- Rheum palmatum Linnaeus 1759, also known as Turkey rhubarb, East Indian rhubarb, or palmate rhubarb
- Rheum officinale Baillon 1871, also known as Indian rhubarb, Tibetan rhubarb, or medicinal rhubarb
