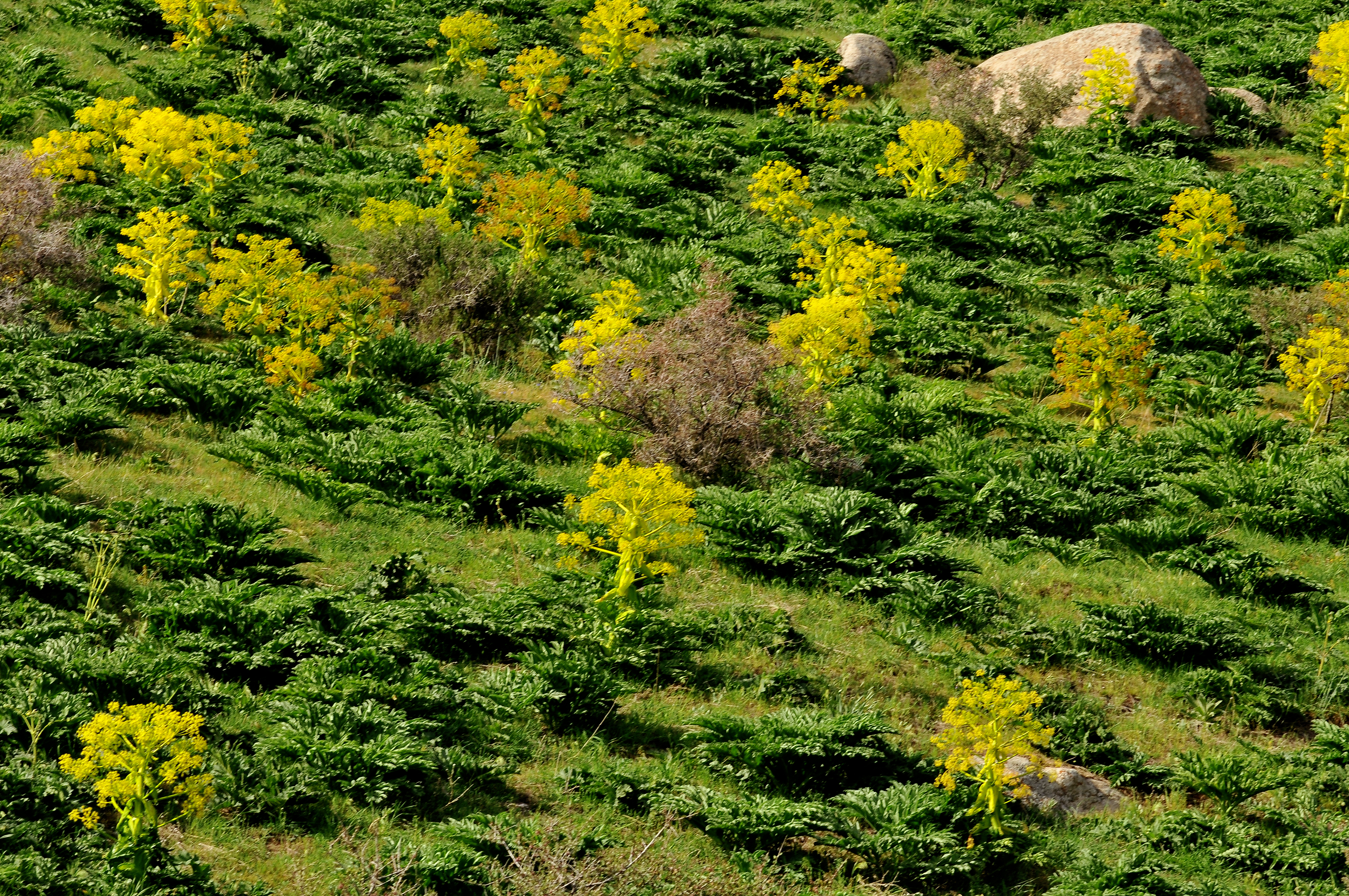
- Growing in situ on a granite foothill in the Zarafshan Range, en route to the Takhta-Karacha Pass, Qashqadaryo Region, Uzbekistan

Scientific classification
- Kingdom: Plantae
- Clade: Tracheophytes
- Clade: Angiosperms
- Clade: Eudicots
- Order: Caryophyllales
- Family: Polygonaceae
- Genus: Rheum
- Species: R. maximowiczii

Binomial name
- Rheum maximowiczii Losinsk. Izv. Bot. Sada Akad. Nauk S.S.S.R. 30:382. 1932

Synonyms
- Rheum megalacarpum Maxim. ex. B.Fedtsch. nomen nudum; Rheum ribes Korolk. non L.

= Rheum maximowiczii =

Species of flowering plant

Rheum maximowiczii is a large herbaceous perennial plant species in the genus Rheum (rhubarbs) from the mountains of Central Asia where it grows in Kazakhstan, eastern Uzbekistan, Tajikistan, Kyrgyzstan and northeastern Afghanistan.

== Taxonomy ==
This species first appeared before modern science in the herbarium of Karl Maximovich, in which he labelled the specimen as Rheum megalacarpum. One of the first Europeans to write about this species was the General Nikolai Ivanovich Korolkov, who was engaged in the conquering of Turkestan, and collected herbarium specimens of this plant there in the early 1870s. Another early collector was Johann Albert von Regel, who collected specimens of this species less than a decade later in the highlands throughout the region (Kazakhstan, Uzbekistan, Tajikistan). He called the plant R. ribes. Boris Fedtschenko later published R. megalacarpum in his 1915 work Растительность Туркестана, the Flora of Turkestan, but omitted a valid description. Agnia Losina-Losinskaja validly published the taxon in 1932 (the date in the publication itself is 1931) under its present name in the Известия Главного ботанического сада С.С.С.Р., also known as Bulletin du jardin botanique principal de l'U.R.S.S..

== Description ==
It has a single, reddish, leafless, branched stem 40–100 cm (16–39 in) tall, the base of which is compressed to (only) one side and is sulcate and is covered in minute warts or smooth. The lateral branches open to less than 45° to form a pyramidal-shaped inflorescence.

The leaves are round, 50 cm (20 in) long and 60 cm (24 in) wide, and have a reniform base. The margin is slightly wavy and fringed in tiny needles. Each leaf has three extremely prominent veins which are lateral at the base and only fork towards the margin. The top of the leaf is smooth; the underside is warty along the veins. The petiole is short, shorter than half of the leaf blade, the top being warty, rarely glabrous (smooth).

The flowers are congregated and have a long peduncle which is jointed at the base. The greenish tepals are subequal, around 3 mm (0.1 in) long and 1 mm (0.04 in) wide. The stamens are very long.

The large, oval fruit are 20 mm (0.8 in) long and 15 mm (0.6 in) wide, and have lateral, cordate wings – dark reddish-black when ripe, red when immature, with a vein running near the edge. The tepals hug the fruit. The seed is ovoid, wrinkled and brown.

=== Similar species ===
In her original 1932 description, as well as in her 1936 key in Komarov's Flora SSSR, Losinskaja considers this species closely related and most similar to Rheum ribes, the desert rhubarb of the mountains of the Middle East, in leaves and flowers, classifying them both in the section Ribesiformia. It can be distinguished from this species by its much smoother stem, much shorter leaf petiole and pyramidal-shaped inflorescence.

=== Hybrids ===
The natural hybrid Rheum × svetlanae from Central Asia is a hybrid of this species and R. compactum.

== Distribution ==
It is primarily found in the Pamir, Altai and Western Tian-Shan mountains.

It is found in Kazakhstan, eastern Uzbekistan, Tajikistan, Kyrgyzstan and northeastern Afghanistan.

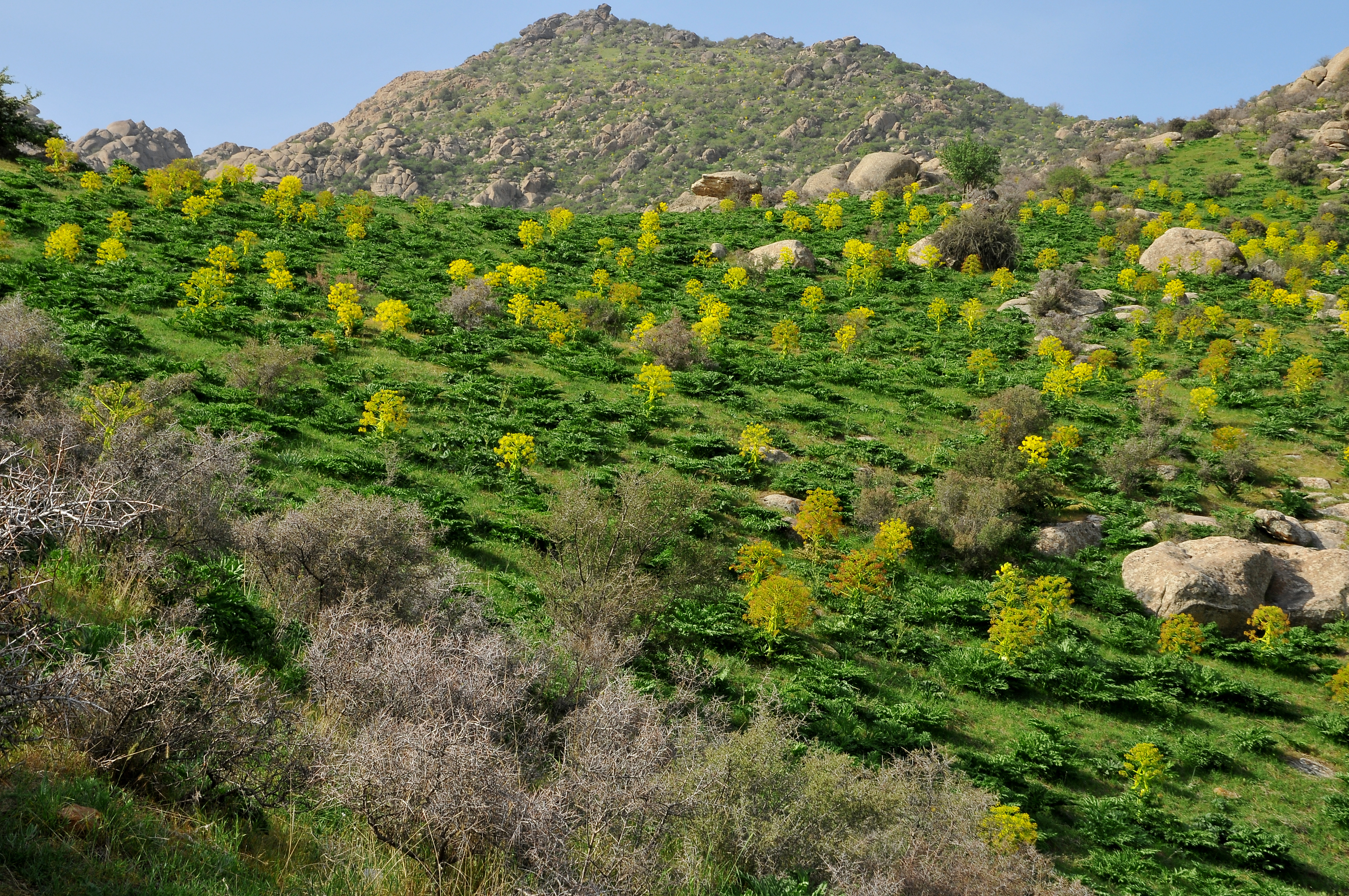
Habitat

It grows in the Chimgan mountains in Uzbekistan, Chatkalsky Gorge in an offshoot of the Western Tian-Shan near Tashkent, the Chatkal Range straddling Uzbekistan and Kyrgyzstan, as well as the Zarafshan Range straddling Uzbekistan and Tajikistan. It also has been found growing in the Hissar Range and in the land around the Vakhsh River in Tajikistan. In Kyrgyzstan it grows in the Chuy region and Taldy-Bulak valley in the Talas Alatau, Talas Region. In Kazakhstan it is found growing in the Kaskasu Gorge in the Karzhantau range, Korday Pass, the Kuyuk Pass near Taraz, in a number of places in the Aksu-Zhabagly Nature Reserve, on the Zhetysu ridge in the Ala-tau, and in the Karatau Mountains.

== Ecology ==
=== Life cycle ===
It flowers in Kazakhstan from May to June.

=== Habitat & plant associations ===
It has been collected growing from approximately 1700 to 3200m in elevation in the Western Tian-Shan, from in the 1300 to 2000m in the Chatkalsky, from 2300 to 2600m in the Zarafshan Range, 1780m in the Hissar, and 3300 to 3700m in the Vakhsh region.

In southwestern Gorno-Badakhshan it usually grows in a type of ecosystem called taran in the local Tajik, although it is not always present. This ecosystem is somewhat uncommon, but may occur at a variety of elevations on alluvial fans near snow accumulations, and is characterised by being dominated by large herbaceous Polygonum coriarium. Other plant species which usually may share this taran habitat are Prangos pabularia, Ferula jaeschkeana, F. grigoriewii, Heracleum olgae, Ephedra tibetica, E. ciliata, E. gerardiana and Artemisia species. In the Shugnan area it grows on mildly sloping scree together with Prangos pabularia, Ferula grigoriewii, Heracleum lehmannianum, H. olgae, Polygonum coriarium, Ephedra spp. and Artemisia spp., with on the steeper slopes isolated plants of the climber Ampelopsis vitifolia, Perovskia scrophulariifolia, Onobrychis echidna, the wild chickpea Cicer songaricum and sometimes the cushion plant Acantholimon pamiricum.

In the Kaskasu Gorge of Kazakhstan it grows in the foothills in grass and gravel, unlike the sympatric Rheum wittrockii which is found in more wooded settings.

It grows at the altitude of 2200m in the Chuy region of Kyrgyzstan in pastures used for grazing milking mares together with plants such as Codonopsis clematidea, Cysticorydalis fedtschenkoana, Dactylorhiza umbrosa, Dictamnus angustifolius and Korolkowia sewerzowii.

It shares its habitat in the hills around Korday Pass with Anemone petiolulosa and Iris kuschakewiczii, a bit lower down on flatter ground the common species are Leontice eversmanii, Gagea filiformis, Tulipa greigii and T. ostrowskiana, and hidden under shrub cover Corydalis ledebouriana and Eranthis longistipitata. Gagea ova is present, but rare here.

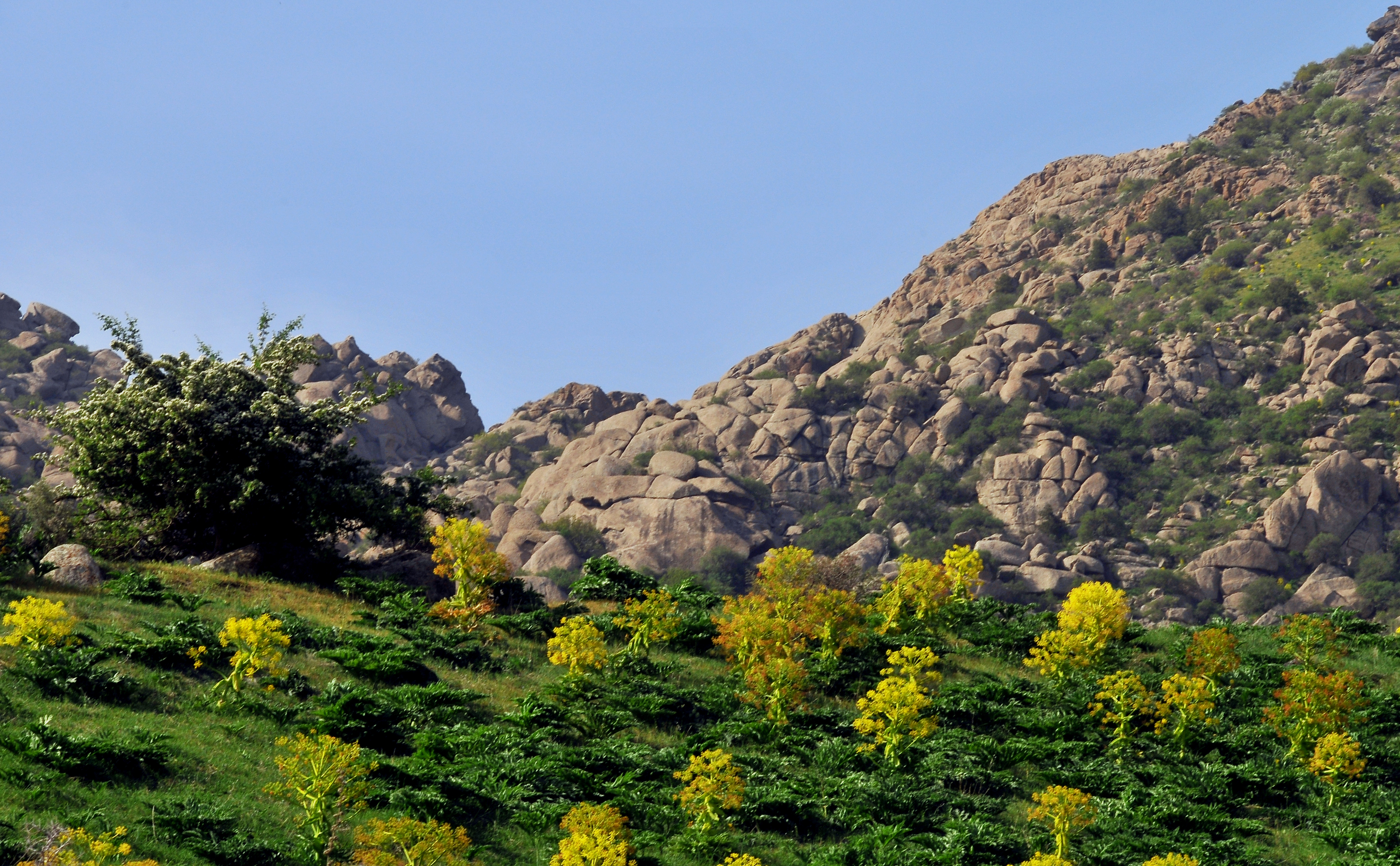
Habitat

=== Animal interactions ===
The emerging leaves of this rhubarb are an important food source for the Himalayan brown bear (Ursus arctos ssp. isabellinus) when it emerges from hibernation in April in the Taldy-Bulak valley in the Talas Alatau, Talas Region, Kyrgyzstan; their droppings looking just like stewed rhubarb. It grows here in between trees of Prunus mahaleb together with Pedicularis olgae and the large-flowered Anemone gortschakovii.

The caterpillars of the blue butterfly Callophrys titanus, which is found from southern Kazakhstan to Tajikistan and was described in 1998, have only been found to feed on R. maximowiczii. These caterpillars are myrmecophilous and are attended by a coterie of protective ants of the genus Lasius.

== Uses ==
In the country report submitted to the Food and Agriculture Organization (FAO) for the Global Plan of Action for the International Treaty on Plant Genetic Resources for Food and Agriculture, part of the Convention on Biological Diversity, the Ministry of Agriculture of Kazakhstan identifies R. maximowiczii as an edible, but under-utilized, plant.

== Local names ==
It is known as максимович рауғашы or максимович рауғаш in Kazakh. In Russian it is known as ревень максимовича.

== Chemistry ==
Maximol A can be found in R. maximowiczii.
