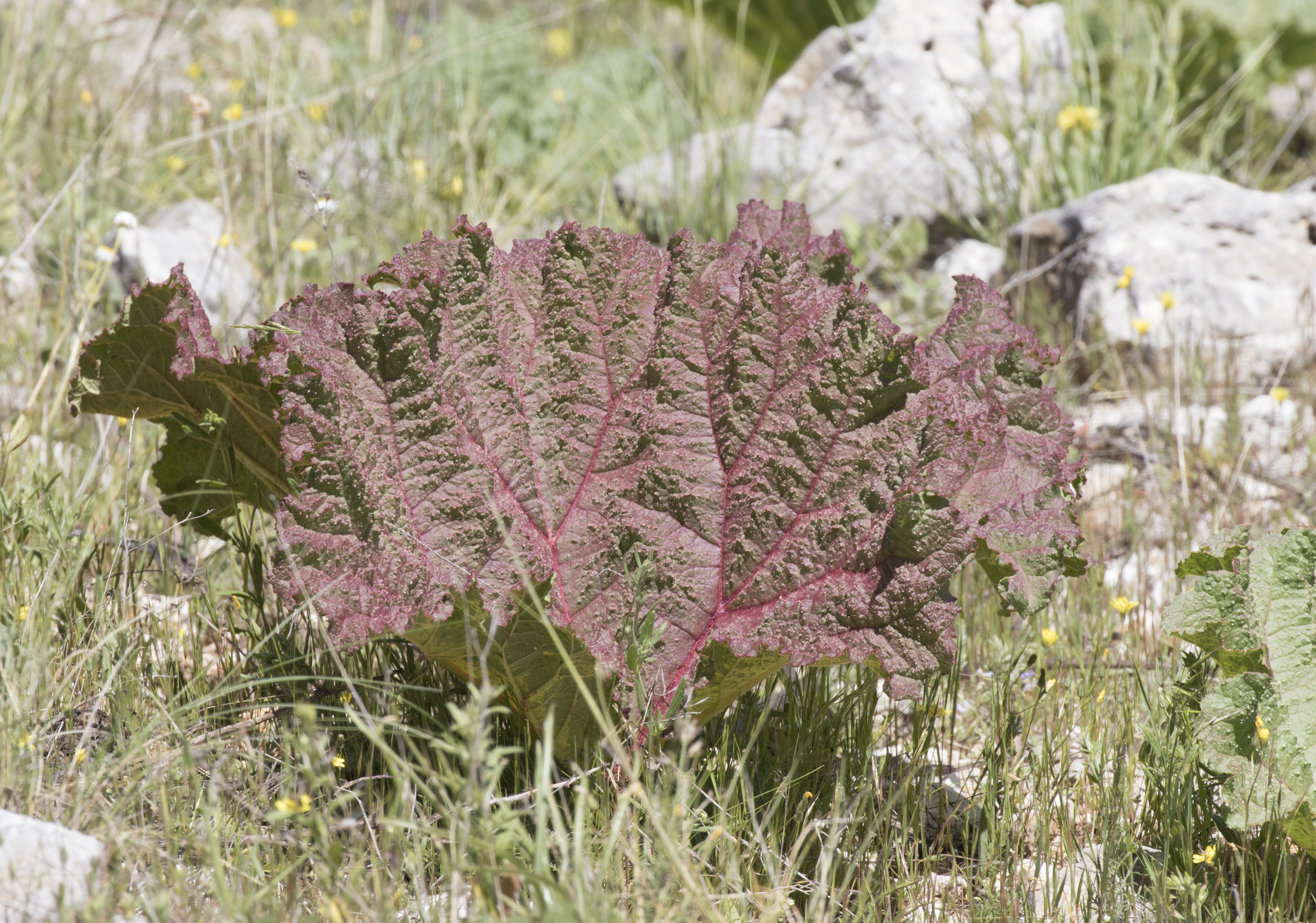

Scientific classification
- Kingdom: Plantae
- Clade: Embryophytes
- Clade: Tracheophytes
- Clade: Spermatophytes
- Clade: Angiosperms
- Clade: Eudicots
- Order: Caryophyllales
- Family: Polygonaceae
- Genus: Rheum
- Species: R. ribes

Binomial name
- Rheum ribes L.

Synonyms
- Rhabarbarum ribes (L.) Moench

= Rheum ribes =

Syrian rhubarb

Species of plant

Rheum ribes, the Syrian rhubarb or currant-fruited rhubarb, or warty-leaved rhubarb, is an edible wild rhubarb species in the genus Rheum. It grows between 1000 and 4000 m on dunite rocks, among stones and slopes, and is now distributed in the temperate and subtropical regions of the world, chiefly in Western Asia (Turkey, Syria, Lebanon, Iran, Azerbaijan, Armenia) to Afghanistan and Pakistan. The Syrian rhubarb is a partially commercial vegetable collected from wild patches in Eastern and Southern Anatolia, Kurdistan, and partly Northwestern Iran in early spring. Rheum ribes is considered as a valuable medicinal species in herbal medicine.

== Description ==
The Syrian rhubarb is a dichotomously branched perennial stout herb, up to 1 m tall. It has thick perennial rhizomes, large annual bean-shaped reddish-green leaves with stalks, edible flower stalks, small yellowish flowers arranged in panicles, three-sided ovate-oblong achenes and broad red-winged dull brown fruit. The flowering stem (peduncle) is solid, warty, leafy below, leafless above.

=== Similar species ===
It is very similar to the species Rheum palaestinum, being distinguished by having five central leaf veins as opposed to three, and being taller.

Agnia Losina-Losinskaja considered it very similar in leaves and flowers to R. maximowiczii from further north in Central Asia, but to be distinguished from it by its much rougher stem, much longer leaf petioles and broader inflorescence. R. maximowiczii furthermore has three veins per leaf.

=== Karyotypy ===
R. ribes has a chromosome count of 2n=44.

== Taxonomy ==
Rheum ribes was first formally described in 1753 by Carl Linnaeus. It was one of three species of Rheum described in Species Plantarum volume 1. Linnaeus referred to five earlier authors who had described the plant: Johann Jacob Dillenius, Jacob Breyne (who calls it a Lapathum, known as Ribes arabicum), Richard Pococke (who published in 1745 a description of his travels in the Near East and who brought seeds to England from Lebanon), Leonhard Rauwolf and Gaspard Bauhin.

In 1936 Losina-Losinskaja, in Komarov's Flora SSSR, classifies this species in section Ribesiformia, in which she also places R. maximowiczii, R. fedtschenkoi, R. cordatum, R. hissaricum and R. macrocarpum (and R. lobatum and R. plicatum, which are both now seen as synonyms of R. macrocarpum).

== History ==
This plant is first mentioned in Europe in the Arabic work, in English called the Book of Simple Medicaments, by Serapion the Younger, the Latin translation of which circulated throughout Europe in the late 13th to 15th century. Serapion says the plant is used to make the medicine thenceforth known in Europe as rob ribes. In Europe, herbalists initially thought he was describing a currant, which they then used to make local, lesser ribes.

One of the first European works to write about this plant unambiguously was the Viertes Kreutterbuech - darein vil schoene und frembde Kreutter of 1576 by Leonhard Rauwolf, the first modern European botanist to travel through the Levant and Mesopotamia. The Viertes Kreutterbuech is one of the first herbaria – the first with plants collected outside of Europe – and contains Rauwolf's notes on the pressed plants displayed. Rauwolf calls the plant Ribes arabum and saw it growing in Lebanon and Palestine. He says the rob ribes of Serapion is made from the young flowering stalk.

In the 1623 Pinax Theatri Botanici, Gaspard Bauhin attempts to sort all the plant names hitherto published. In this work he organises all Grossularia and Ribes species known at the time into 13 species, the twelfth of which is Rheum ribes, which Bauhin calls Ribes arabicum. Bauhin bases this on the work of Rauwolf, but also Clusius (who calls it Ribes legitima arabum), Camerarius (Ribes serapionis), Rembert Dodoens (Ribes serapionis foliis oxylapathi) and Pierre Belon.

In 1732, Johann Jacob Dillenius published his Hortus Elthamensis – a book of rare plants grown in London – which describes this plant. He calls it a type of Lapathum (now Rumex), but mentions that it is known as Ribes arabicum. Dillenius obtained seeds in 1726 from William Sherard, who brought them from Lebanon in 1724. He mentions that it was only grown elsewhere in Europe in Leyden, from an older source.

The specific epithet ribes is thus derived via Serapion from the Arabic word rībās (ريباس), referring to the Syrian rhubarb. The New Latin word ribes (currant) was corrupted from the Arabic word rībās by Europeans in the Renaissance, possibly due confusion with the original description of the bunches of berries on its panicle of fruit, with currants, a new crop at the time. R. ribes, unlike many other species of rhubarb, has a fleshy, succulent epicarp around its seeds.

The generic name Rheum is derived from the Greek rheon, mentioned by Dioscorides as a name for medicinal rhubarb; the word rheon is itself thought to be derived from the (old) Persian rewend, which possibly referred to this species.

== Distribution ==
It is native to Syria (including the occupied Golan Heights), Azerbaijan (including Nakhichevan), Jordan, Lebanon, Armenia (as of 2011), Iraq, Turkey, Iran, Pakistan, Afghanistan and Russia.

== Ecology ==
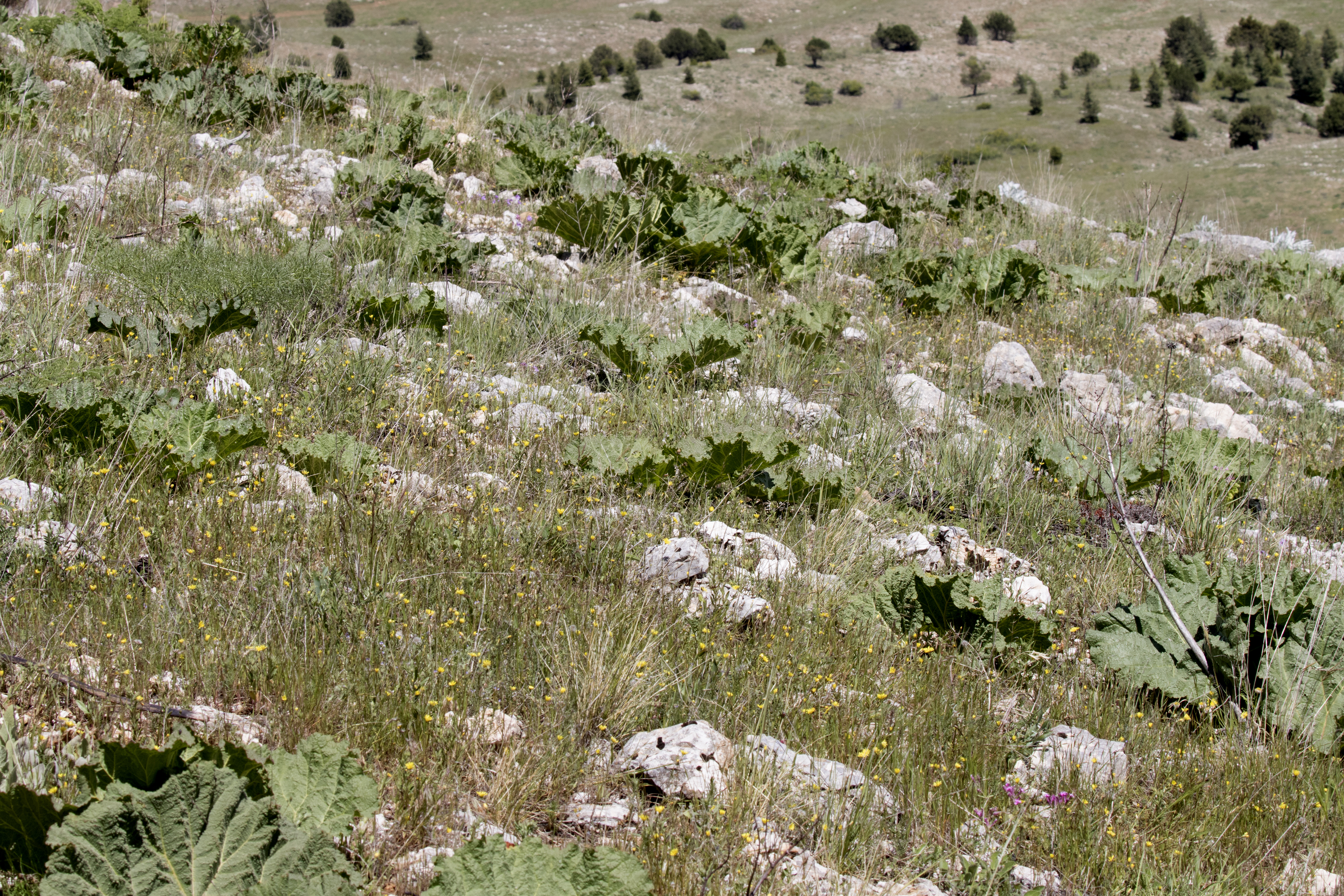
Rheum ribes in early May in situ at Karasakal Mt., Tufanbeyli, near Adana, Turkey.

=== Habitat ===
It is a floristic element of the Irano-Turanian Region or Iran-Turan Plant Geography Region.

It is found in eastern Turkey on dry mountain slopes at 1600-2600m elevation in association with the plants Prangos ferulacea and Cousinia sivasica with which it forms the dominant flora such ecosystems. In Israel it is found on rocky slopes and cliffs in the transition zone of montane forests of Quercus boissieri.

=== Insects ===
Rheum ribes is the main food plant of a tiny hairstreak butterfly, Callophrys mystaphia, of which the Turkish name is ışgınzümrütü, the 'rhubarb emerald', in Adiyaman, Hakkâri, Iğdır, Kahramanmaraş, Kars, Siirt and Van provinces in southeastern and eastern Turkey. This butterfly had not been seen since its description in 1913 (it turned out that the butterflies identified under this name in the former Soviet territories were in fact a different species), but in 2007–2008 it was rediscovered and its host plant was found. This animal has a distribution closely localised to Rheum populations, and has only been found in Turkey.

R. ribes leaves are the food plant of the moth Xylena exsoleta in Van Province, Turkey.

Beetles associated with R. ribes in eastern Turkey are a Petrocladus sp. weevil, the jewel beetle Capnodis marquardti, and the leaf beetle Labidostomis brevipennis. These are all specialised herbivores of the plant, and most appear endemic to Turkey as far as known. L. brevipennis lays its eggs on the leaves.

== Cooking ==
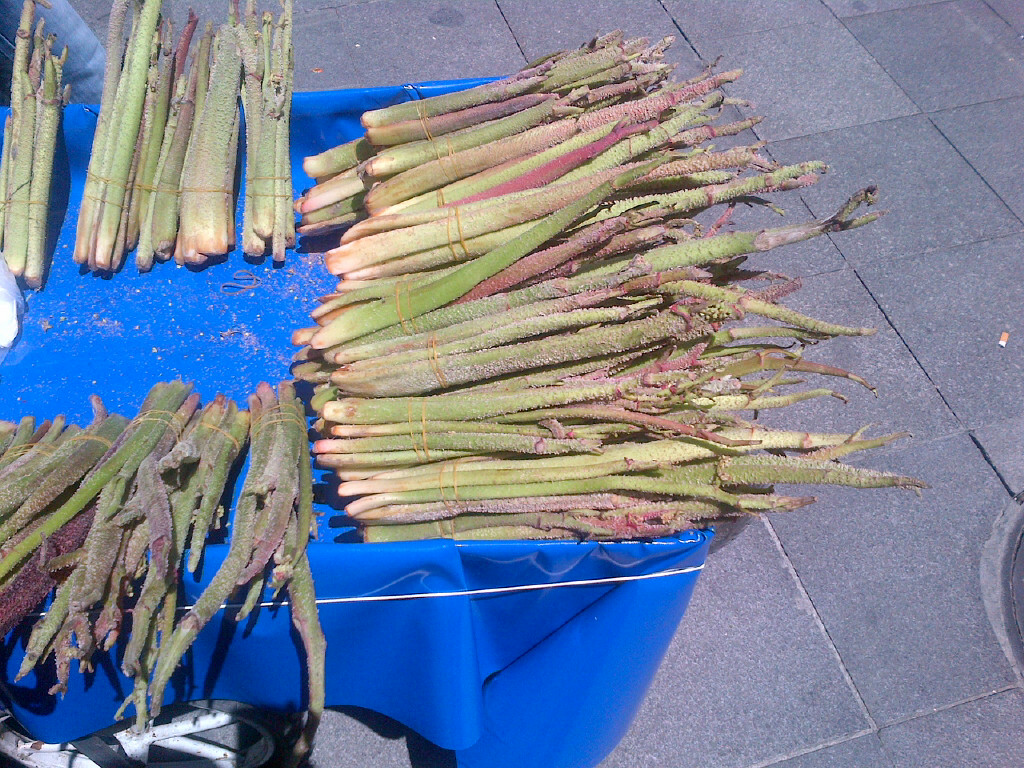
Immature inflorescences for sale at the historical market in Kadıköy, Istanbul, Turkey.

The edible part of the plant is the flowering stem, which is eaten raw or cooked (ekşili ışgın and ışkınlı yumurta [lit. 'eggs with wild rhubarb, Rheum ribes'] in Elazığ, Turkey; khoresh rivas [خورش ریواس] or "Persian rhubarb stew" in Iran) by the local people of Turkey, Syria, Iraq, Iran, Afghanistan, Pakistan. The flowering stem (the petiole) is often eaten raw as salad, sometimes sold in the local markets of Northern Balochistan.

== Traditional and current medicinal uses ==
Rheum ribes is the source of one of the most important crude drugs in West Asiatic regions. These plant vitamins A, B, C are seen in abundance. Syrian rhubarb root (Rhizoma Rhei ribi) is used traditionally to treat diabetes, hemorrhoids, ulcers, and diarrhea. The plant is also used as a digestive and appetizer in Bitlis, Turkey. Traditional herbal medicine stem and root dry plant for the treatment of anemia, anorexia, weakness, anxiety, depression and diabetes. Traditionally Rheum ribes has been used in Iran as sedative and mood enhancer.

The anthraquinones chrysophanol, parietin and emodin, the flavonoids quercetin, fisetin, quercetin 3-0-rhamnoside, quercetin 3-0-galactoside and quercetin 3-0-rutinoside were isolated from the shoots of Syrian rhubarb.

== Conservation ==
In Israel it is an extremely rare plant found at two sites in the mountains of the Golan Heights, but it is not protected by law.

== Names ==
=== Antiquated English names ===
rhubarb-currant, warted-leaved rhubarb, rhubarb of Babilonia

=== Local names ===
- Arabic: rībās (ريباس) or rāvandu'r-rībāṣ (راوند الريباص ) (lit. "rībās rhubarb"), in old Arabic 'utrufan, as in the pre-Islamic poetry of Abu Du'ad al-Iyadi
- Armenian xanjil haġarǰi (Խանձիլ հաղարջի) or Turkish loanword išxun (իշխուն)
- Azerbaijani qarağat rəvəndi (lit. "currant rhubarb")
- Dari (Afghan Persian) čukri (چکری)
- Hebrew ribes hermoni (ריבס חרמוני) (lit. "rhubarb of Mount Hermon")
- Kurdish ribêz, rêvaz, rêvas, rêwas, rêwaz / ڕێواس
- Persian rīvās (ريواس)
- Russian ревень смородинный
- Syriac yaġmīṣā (ܝܓܡܝܨܐ)
- Turkish ışgın. From Middle Turkic Divânu Lügati't-Türk by Mahmud al-Kashgari: ışgun (اِشْغُنْ)
- Urdu rawash
- Zazaki rıbês
- Pashto پښۍ
