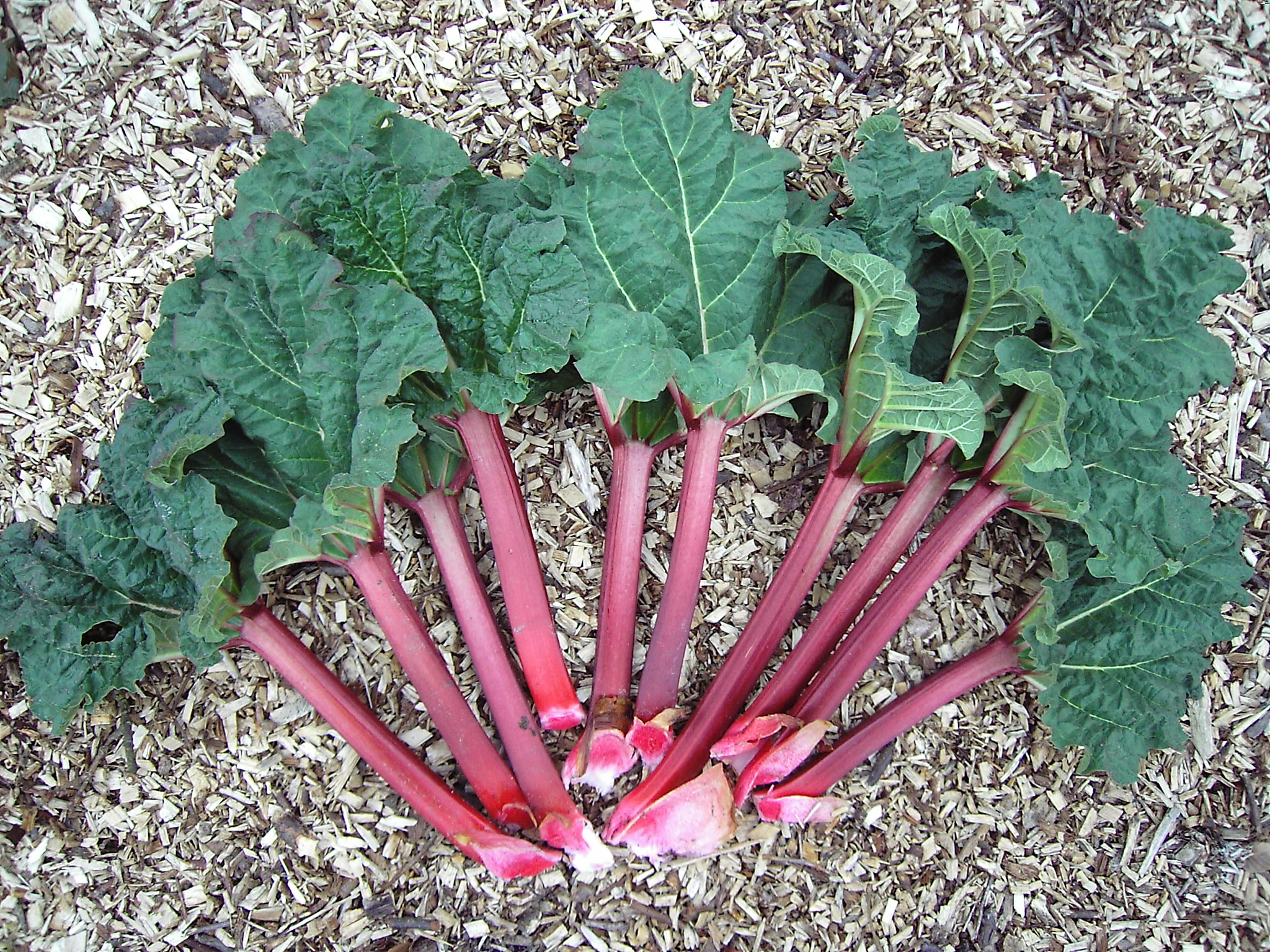

Scientific classification
- Kingdom: Plantae
- Clade: Tracheophytes
- Clade: Angiosperms
- Clade: Eudicots
- Order: Caryophyllales
- Family: Polygonaceae
- Subfamily: Polygonoideae
- Genus: Rheum; L.

Species
- See text.

Synonyms
- Rhabarbarum Fabr.

= Rheum (plant) =

Genus of flowering plants

Rheum is a genus of about 60 herbaceous perennial plants in the family Polygonaceae. Species are native to eastern Europe, southern and eastern temperate Asia, with a few reaching into northern tropical Asia. Rheum species are cultivated in Europe, Asia, and North America. The genus includes the vegetable rhubarb. The species have large somewhat triangular shaped leaves with long, fleshy petioles. The flowers are small, greenish-white to rose-red, and grouped in large compound leafy inflorescences. Many rhubarb cultivars have been domesticated as medicinal plants and for human consumption. While the leaves are slightly toxic, the stalks are used in pies and other foods for their tart flavour.

== Description ==
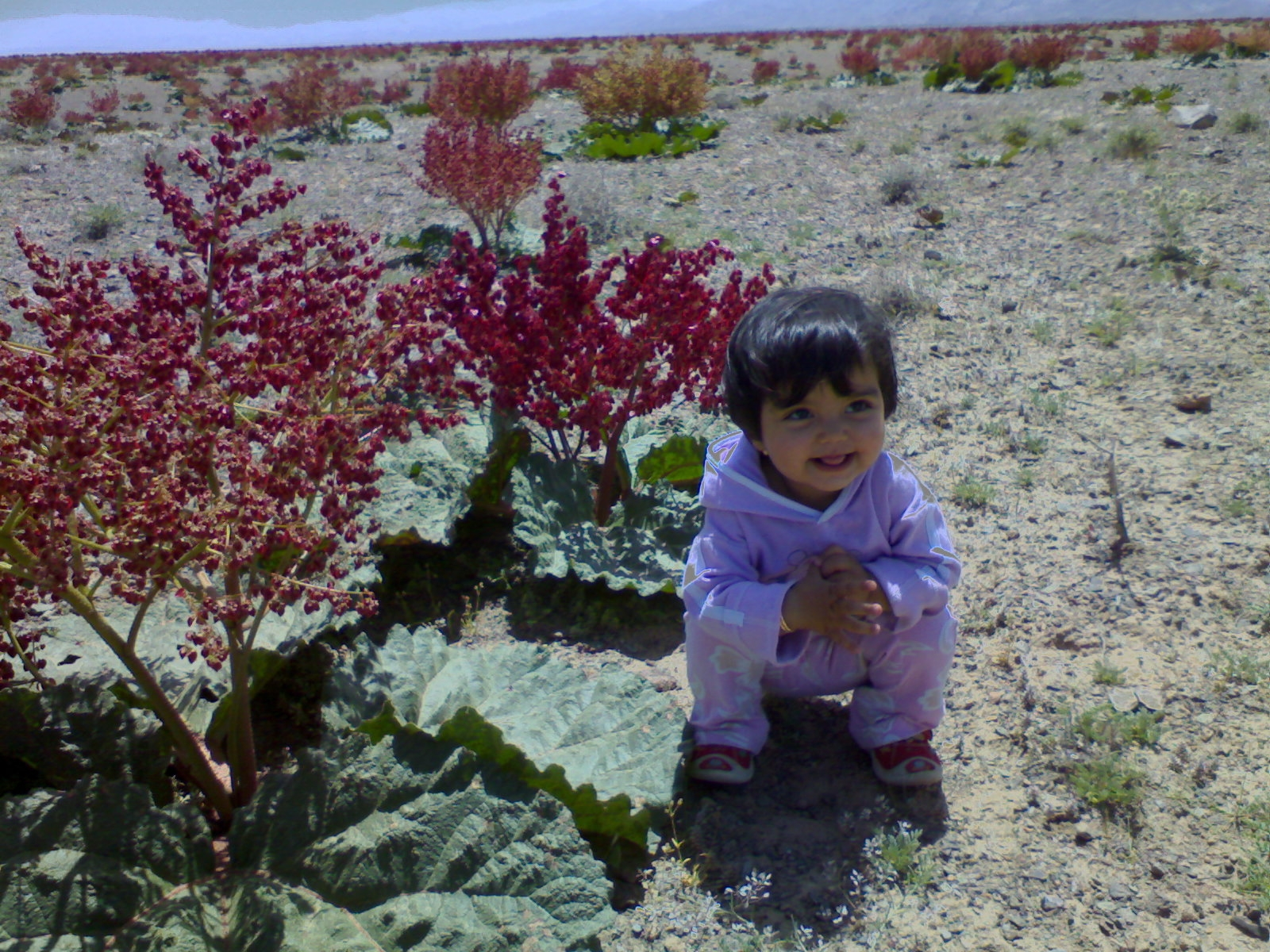
Rheum ribes (left) growing in Iran

Rheum species are herbaceous perennials growing from fleshy roots. They have upright growing stems and mostly basal, deciduous leaves growing from short, thick rhizomes. They have persistent or deciduous ocrea. The inflorescences are terminal and panicle-like with pedicels. The hermaphrodite flowers consist of a whitish green to pinkish green, hairless and campanulate (bell-shaped) perianth, composed of six tepals. The outer three tepals are narrower than the inner three and all are sepal-like in appearance. The flowers have nine (sometimes six) stamina inserted on the torus at the base of the peranthium, they are free or subconnate at their base. The anthers are yellow or pinkish green, elliptic in shape. The ovary is simple and triangular shaped with three erect or deflexed styles. The stigmas are head-like. The fruits are a three-sided achene with winged sides, and the seeds are albuminous with a straight or curved embryo.

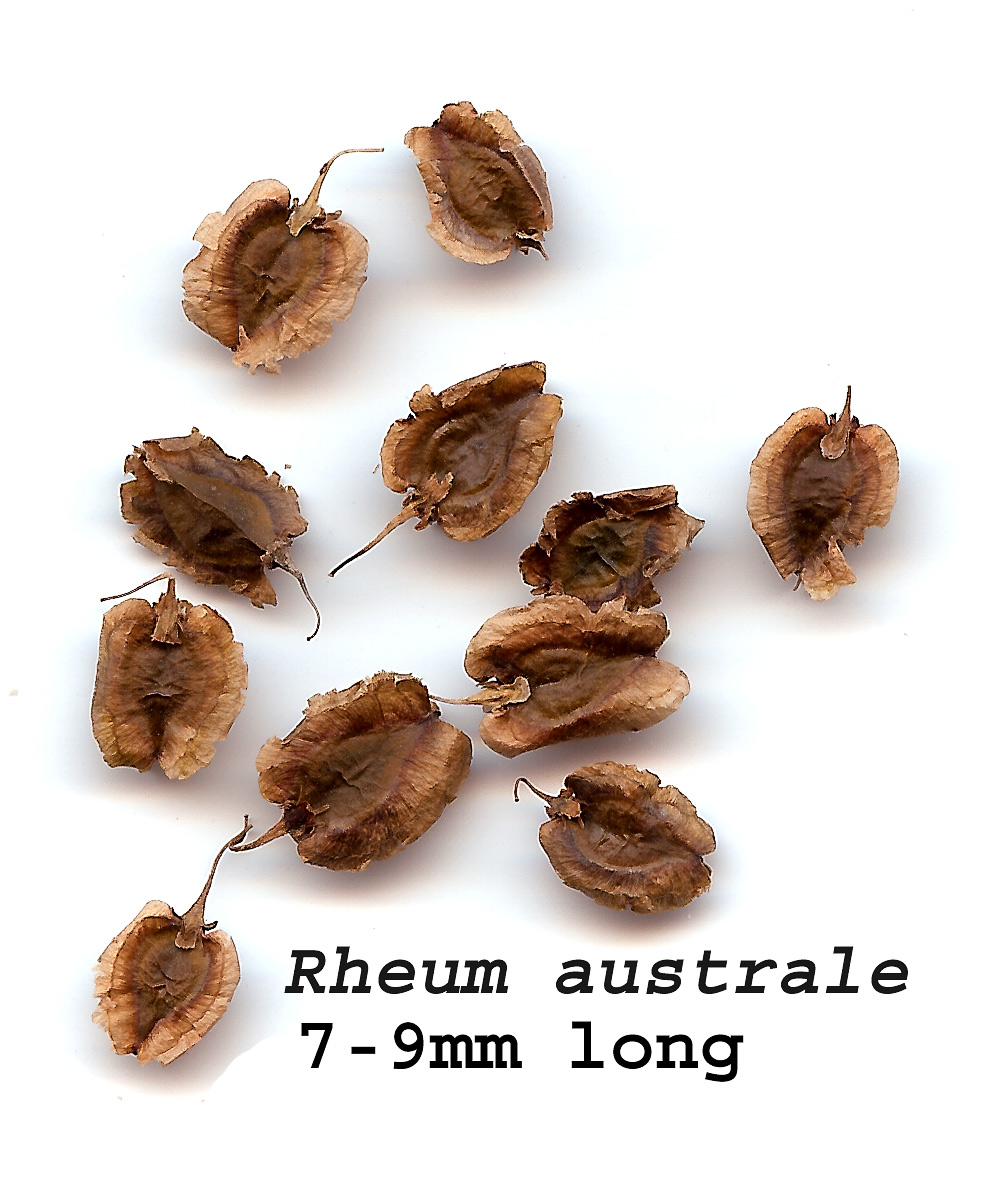
Seeds

== Taxonomy ==
The genus Rheum was described in 1753 by Carl Linnaeus, initially for three species: R. rhaponticum, R. rhabarbarum and R. ribes. Linnaeus did not explain the origin of the genus name. Rheum is usually derived from the Greek rheon, mentioned by Dioscorides as an alternative name for medicinal rhubarb; the word rheon is itself thought to be derived from the (old) Persian rewend. Dioscorides calls the plant rha, but mentions the Romans call it rha ponticum, and it was also called ria or rheon. It is theorised the Ancient Greek word rha was derived from an ancient Scythian name for the Volga River in Russia, Rā, near from where the plant was supposedly brought. (See Volga River § Nomenclature.)

In 1936 Agnia Losina-Losinskaja in Vladimir Leontyevich Komarov's Flora SSSR recognised 22 native species for the USSR, and furthermore two introduced species, one variety, and one form. The 1989 Plants of Central Asia, dealing with a larger geographical remit, has Alisa E. Grabovskaya-Borodina recognising only 12 species, synonymising a great number. The Vascular plants of Russia and adjacent states of 1995 accepted 17 species for the states of the former USSR, re-recognising many of the taxa as species. In the Flora of China in 2003 Borodina and Bao Bojian recognise 38 species (of which 19 are endemic) in China, including a number Borodina considered synonyms in 1989.

=== Intergeneric relationships ===
Rheum is placed in the family Polygonaceae, subfamily Polygonoideae. Within the subfamily, it is in the tribe Rumiceae, along with the two genera Oxyria and Rumex. It is most closely related to Rumex.

- Rumiceae
  - Oxyria
  - - Rumex
    - Rheum

=== Infrageneric classification ===
In the 1998 Flora Republicae popularis Sinicae, A. R. Li proposed classifying the Chinese representatives of the genus into five sections. These sections are distinct morphologically, but as of 2010 studies in karyotypy, pollen morphology or molecular data (chloroplast DNA) have failed to elucidate interspecific relationships.

- Sect. Rheum - Generally mid-sized species with entire, un-lobed leaves and whitish flowers.
- Sect. Deserticola (Maxim.) Losinsk. - Smallish species native to harsh desert environments.
- Sect. Nobilia A.R. Li - Large, monocarpic, high altitude species from the Himalayas that create their own mini-greenhouse by having an inflorescence tightly protected by transparent bracts.
- Sect. Palmata Losinsk. - The largest rhubarbs to 2m tall, with palmate, or otherwise lobed, leaves and reddish flowers.
- Sect. Spiciforma A.R. Li - Generally stemless, high altitude species with curiously hard, leathery leaves and an inflorescence with thin, spike-like panicles. Including many dwarf species.

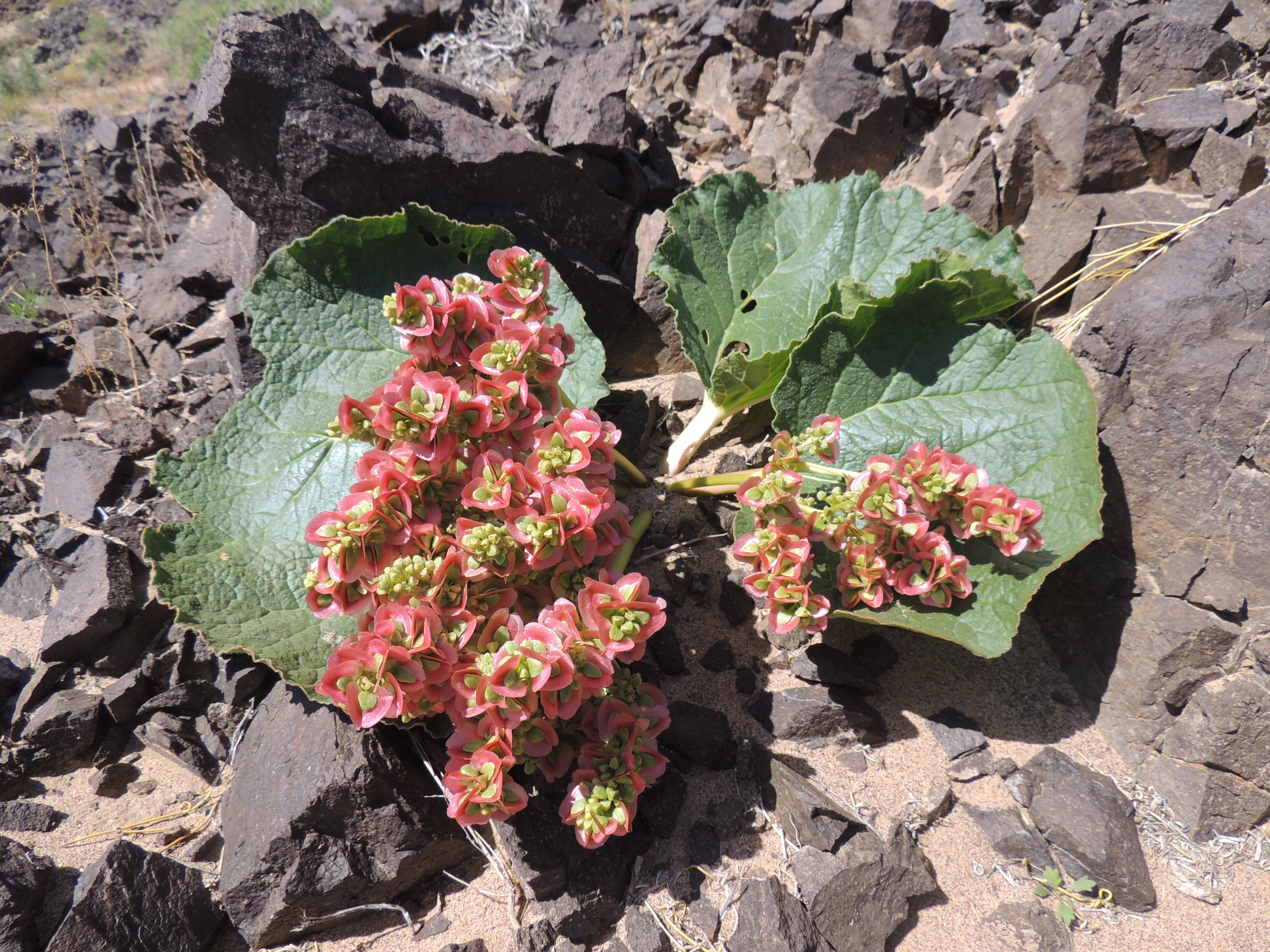
Rheum nanum is the sole species in Losinskaja's section Acaulia

Losinskaja used a slightly different classification in the Flora SSSR in 1936:

- Sect. Acaulia Losinsk.
- Sect. Deserticola (Maxim.) Losinsk.
- Sect. Glabrifolia Losinsk.
- Sect. Palmata Losinsk.
- Sect. Rhapontica Losinsk.
- Sect. Ribesiformia Losinsk.
- Sect. Spiciformia Losinsk.

=== Species ===
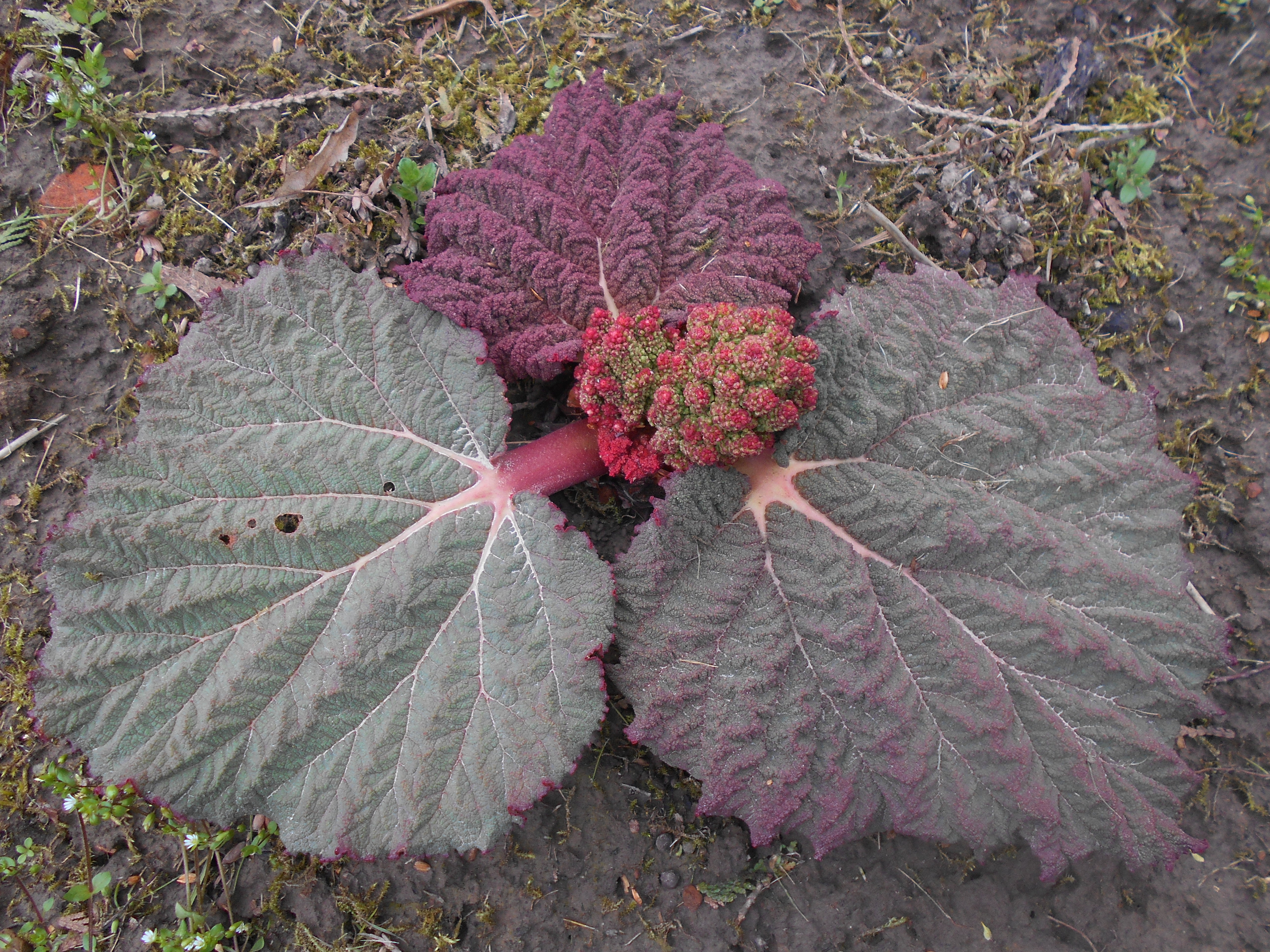
Rheum tibeticum in May, cultivated in Poland.

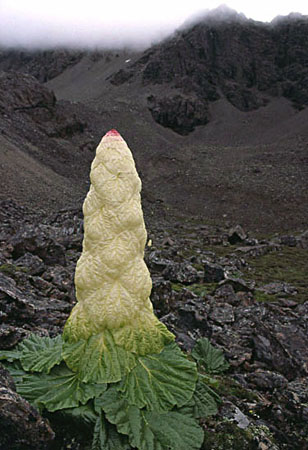
Rheum nobile

The genus is represented by about 50–60 extant species. The many cultivars of culinary rhubarb more usually grown for eating are recognised as Rheum × hybridum in the Royal Horticultural Society's list of recognised plant names. The drug rheum is prepared from the rhizomes and roots of another species, R. officinale or medicinal rhubarb. This species is also native to Asia, as is the turkey rhubarb, R. palmatum. Another species, the Sikkim rhubarb, R. nobile, is limited to the Himalayas.

The centre of diversity for this genus is found in Central Asia.

Plants of the World Online accepts 56 species, some of which, according to some authorities, are considered synonyms or not fully resolved or accepted:

- Rheum acuminatum Hook.f. & Thomson
- Rheum alexandrae Batalin
- Rheum australe D.Don
- Rheum austroiranicum Taheri & Assadi
- Rheum compactum L.
- Rheum cordatum Losinsk.
- Rheum coreanum Nakai
- Rheum darvasicum V.S.Titov ex Losinsk.
- Rheum delavayi Franch.
- Rheum fedtschenkoi Maxim. ex Regel
- Rheum forrestii Diels
- Rheum glabricaule Sam.
- Rheum globulosum Gage
- Rheum hissaricum Losinsk.
- Rheum hotaoense C.Y.Cheng & T.C.Kao
- Rheum × hybridum Murray – common rhubarb, artificial hybrid of R. palmatum × R. rhaponticum
- Rheum inopinatum Prain
- Rheum khorasanicum Baradaran & Jafari
- Rheum kordestanicum Taheri & Assadi
- Rheum kialense Franch.
- Rheum laciniatum Prain
- Rheum lhasaense A.J.Li & P.K.Hsiao
- Rheum likiangense Sam.
- Rheum lucidum Losinsk.
- Rheum macrocarpum Losinsk.
- Rheum maculatum C.Y.Cheng & T.C.Kao
- Rheum maximowiczii Losinsk.
- Rheum moorcroftianum Royle
- Rheum nanum Siev. ex Pall.
- Rheum neyshabourense Baradaran & Jafari
- Rheum nobile Hook.f. & Thomson
- Rheum officinale Baill.
- Rheum palaestinum Feinbrun
- Rheum palmatum L.
- Rheum persicum Losinsk.
- Rheum platylobum Rech.f.
- Rheum przewalskyi Losinsk.
- Rheum pumilum Maxim.
- Rheum racemiferum Maxim.
- Rheum rhabarbarum L.
- Rheum rhaponticum L.
- Rheum rhomboideum Losinsk.
- Rheum ribes L.
- Rheum spiciforme Royle
- Rheum subacaule Sam.
- Rheum sublanceolatum C.Y.Cheng & T.C.Kao
- Rheum × svetlanae Krassovsk. (R. cordatum × R. maximowiczii)
- Rheum tanguticum (Maxim. ex Regel) Balf.
- Rheum tataricum L.f.
- Rheum telianum İlçim
- Rheum tibeticum Maxim. ex Hook.f.
- Rheum turkestanicum Janisch.
- Rheum uninerve Maxim.
- Rheum uzengukuushi Lazkov & H.J.Choi
- Rheum webbianum Royle
- Rheum wittrockii C.E.Lundstr.
- Rheum yunnanense Sam.

== Ecology ==
Rheum species have been recorded as larval food plants for some Lepidoptera species such as the buff ermine, Spilarctia luteum, as well as Arctia caja, Hydraecia micacea and Xestia baja.

Rheum species are often the host plants for myrmecophilous caterpillars of the butterfly genus Callophrys; Callophrys titanus feeds on R. maximowiczii in southern Kazakhstan, C. mystaphia on R. ribes in eastern Turkey, and C. mystaphioides on R. persicum in southwest and central Iran. The caterpillars of the related Lycaena violacea from southeastern Siberia are only known to feed on R. rhabarbarum.

R. ribes leaves are food for the moth Xylena exsoleta in eastern Turkey. Beetles which are specialised herbivores of this plant species in eastern Turkey are a Petrocladus sp. weevil, the jewel beetle Capnodis marquardti, and the leaf beetle Labidostomis brevipennis.

In the Taldy-Bulak valley in the Talas Alatau of Kyrgyzstan, the emerging leaves of R. maximowiczii are an important food source for Himalayan brown bear (Ursus arctos isabellinus) awakening from hibernation in April.

== Uses ==
Many Rheum species have food and medicinal uses. Some of these uses originated in Asia more than 2,000 years ago. All parts of the plant contain slightly poisonous oxalic acid, but its concentration in the leaf stems or petioles used in food preparation is very low, and their acidic flavour instead is caused by nontoxic malic acid. The plants also produce other compounds, including citric acid and anthraquinone glycosides, and the raw or cooked leaf blades are poisonous to humans and livestock if consumed in large enough amounts. Plants in cultivation are propagated by cutting up the crowns of larger plants and by seeds.

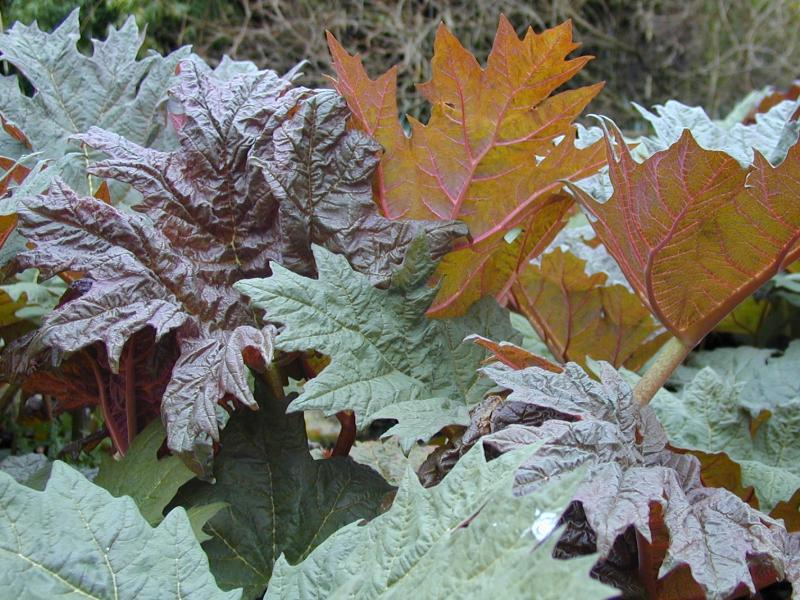
Rheum tanguticum (syn. R. palmatum var. tanguticum)

Some species are grown for their ornamental qualities (they are used as accent plants in indoor and outdoor decoration), including R. acuminatum, R. alexandrae, R. australe, R. kialense, R. palmatum, R. rhabarbarum and R. ribes.

The roots of R. macrocarpum are exploited in the Tian-Shan to make a dye.
