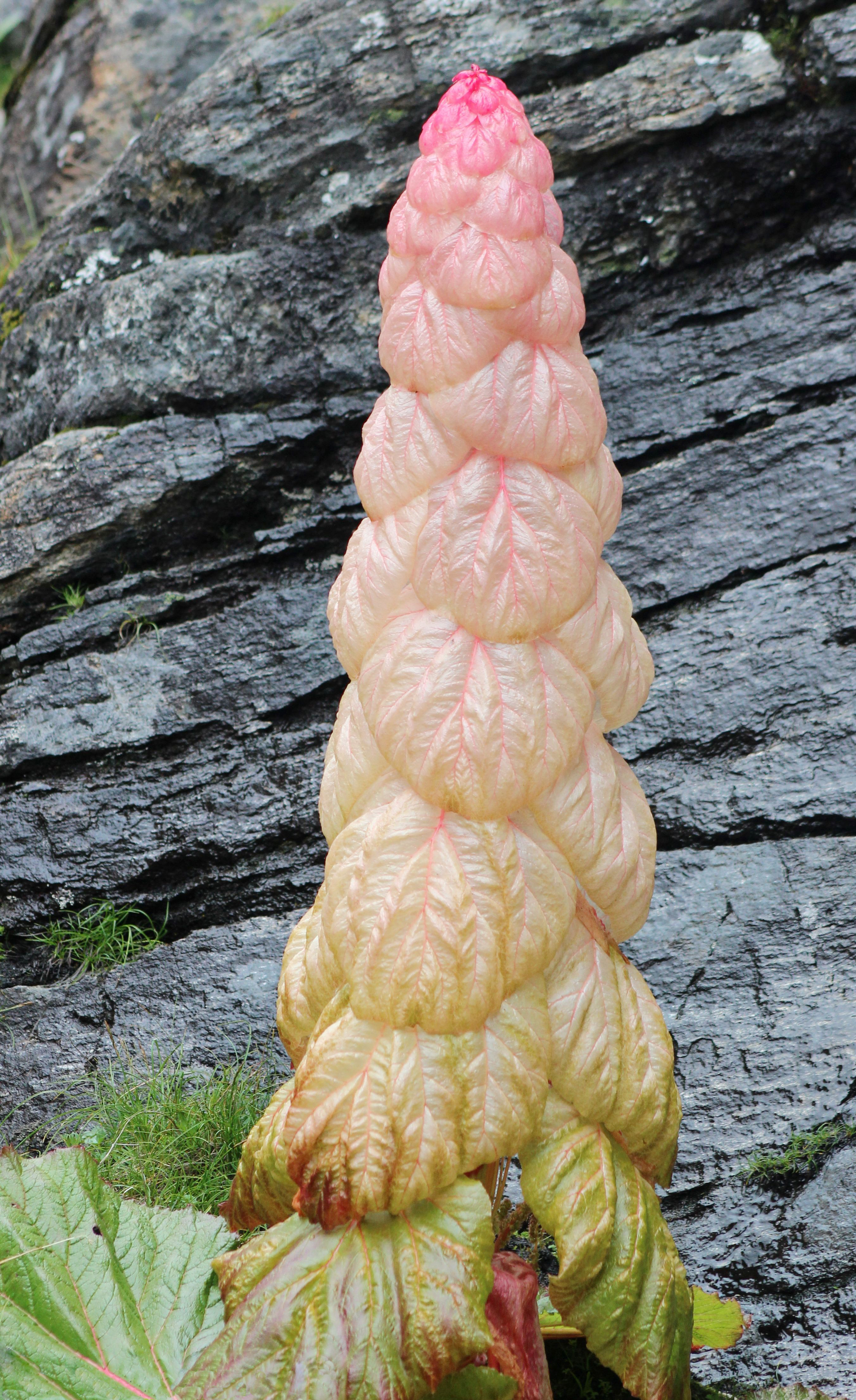

Scientific classification
- Kingdom: Plantae
- Clade: Embryophytes
- Clade: Tracheophytes
- Clade: Spermatophytes
- Clade: Angiosperms
- Clade: Eudicots
- Order: Caryophyllales
- Family: Polygonaceae
- Genus: Rheum
- Species: R. nobile

Binomial name
- Rheum nobile Hook.f. & Thomson

= Rheum nobile =

Noble rhubarb

Species of flowering plant

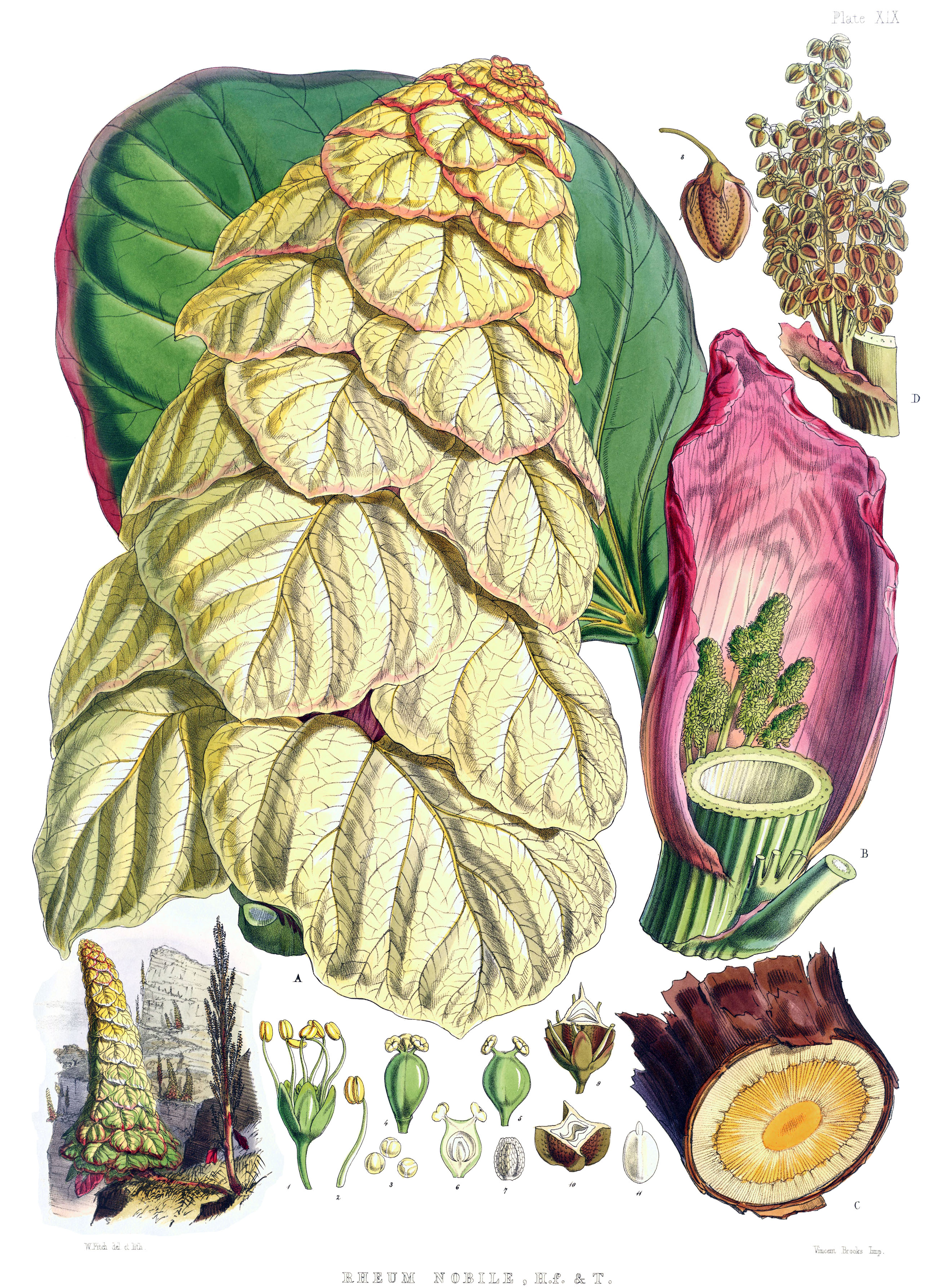
Botanical details

Rheum nobile, the Sikkim rhubarb or noble rhubarb (पदमचाल), is a giant herbaceous plant of the Buckwheat Family (Polygonaceae) and native to the Himalayas, from northeastern Afghanistan, east through northern Pakistan and India (in Sikkim), Nepal, Bhutan, and Tibet to Myanmar, occurring in the alpine zone at 4000–4800 m altitude.

It is an extraordinary species of rhubarb (genus Rheum). At 1–2 m tall, the monocarpic inflorescences of R. nobile tower above the other shrubs and low herbs in its habitat, and it is visible across valleys from several kilometres.

R. nobile is often called a glasshouse plant because of its outer curtain of translucent bracts which pass visible light, creating a greenhouse effect, while blocking ultraviolet radiation. These are likely defenses against the increased UV-B exposure and extreme cold in its high altitude range. It also provides a safe haven for its pollinators against wind and night chill.

== Description ==
An individual R. nobile is a conical tower of delicate, straw-coloured, shining, translucent, regularly overlapping bracts; the higher ones have pink edges. Large, glossy, green radicle leaves, with red petioles and nerves, form a broad base to the plant. Turning up the bracts reveals membranous, fragile, pink stipules. Within these are short branched panicles of diminutive green flowers.

The root is often 1–2 m (3.3–6.6 ft) long and as thick as an arm, and bright yellow inside. After flowering, the stem lengthens and the bracts separate one from another, turning a coarse red-brown. As the fruit ripens, the bracts fall away, leaving a ragged-looking stem covered with panicles of deep brown pendulous fruits. As Hooker put their appearance: "In the winter, these naked black stems, projecting from the beetling cliffs, or towering above the snow, are in dismal keeping with the surrounding desolation of that season."

Photographs of its inflorescence, supposedly showing a “pagoda flower”, have been frequently shared on social media along with the false claim that it only blooms once every 400 years in the Himalayas. But several other websites, including an online catalogue on the flowers and foliage in India, reveal that it blooms annually in June and July. On the other hand, it is one of the largest high-altitude herbaceous plant species in the Himalayas, growing in mountain ranges of Nepal, Sikkim, Bhutan and Tibet at altitudes between 4000m-4800 m. The plant can grow up to 2 metres (6 ft 7 in) in height and it is also known as Sikkim Rhubarb or Noble Rhubarb.

=== Karyotypy ===
R. nobile has a chromosome count of 2n=22.

=== Bracts ===
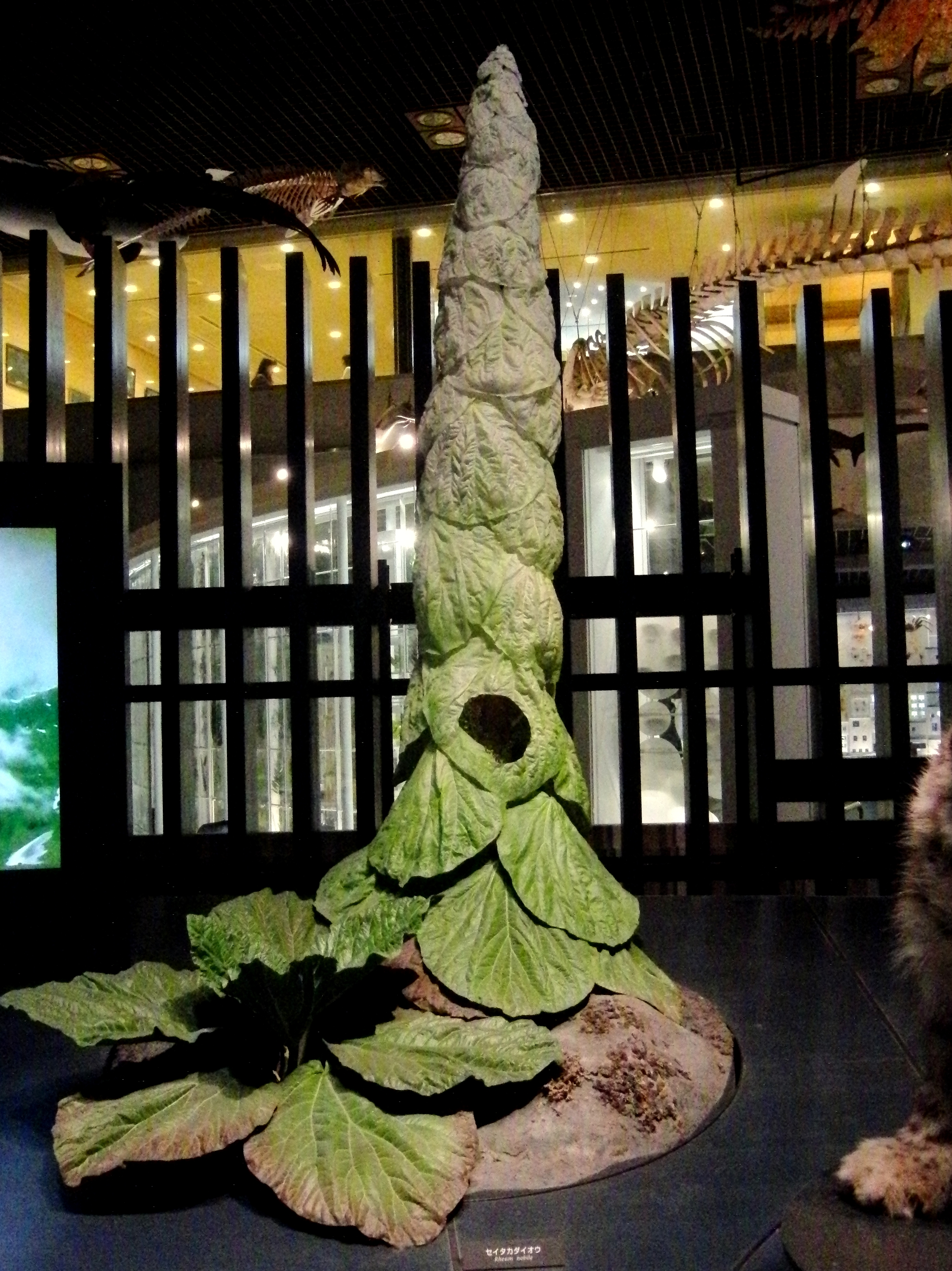
Actual size model of Rheum nobile, exhibited in the National Museum of Nature and Science, Tokyo, Japan.

The bracts of R. nobile are 110-170 μm thick and do not differentiate into palisade and spongy layers. They selectively block ultraviolet radiation while letting almost all visible light through; thus the developing flowers and the apical meristem are protected from the intense radiation found in high altitudes. The major UV blockers found in the bracts are all quercetin flavonoids:

- Rutin, quercetin 3-O-rutinoside: widespread in higher plants and previously reported in leaves and petioles of other Rheum species
- Guaijaverin, quercetin 3-O-arabinoside: first report in Rheum
- Hyperin, quercetin 3-O-galactoside: widespread in plants and previously reported in leaves and petioles of R. rhaponticum
- Isoquercitrin, quercetin 3-O-glucoside: widespread in plants and previously reported in leaves and petioles of R. rhaponticum
- Quercetin 3-O-[6″-(3-hydroxy-3-methylglutaroyl)-glucoside]: first finding in nature

Minor UV blockers include quercetin 7-O-glycoside, quercetin itself, kaempferol glycoside, and feruloyl ester.

== Edibility ==
The stems are pleasantly acidic, and they are consumed by the local people, who call the plant Chuka. The hollow of the stem contains a good deal of limpid water.

== History ==
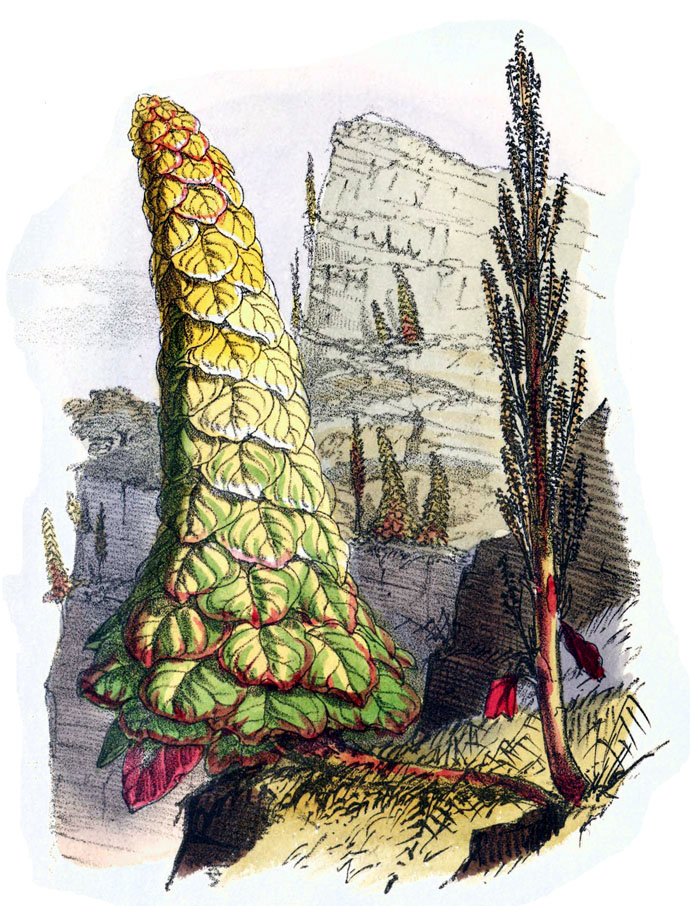
Scene from one of Hooker's sketches

A description of R. nobile was first published by Joseph Dalton Hooker and Thomas Thomson in 1855. Hooker wrote:

"The present is certainly the most striking of the many fine alpine plants of Sikkim; and though in every botanical character, as also in the acid juice of the stem, a genuine Rhubarb, it differs so remarkably in habit and general appearance from any of its congeners, that at first sight it could not be recognized as one of them. I first saw it from a distance of fully a mile, dotting the black cliffs of the Lachen valley at 14,000 feet [4,300 m] elevation, in inaccessible situations, and was quite at a loss to conceive what it could be; not was it till I had turned back the curious bracteal leaves and examined the flowers that I was persuaded of its being a true Rhubarb."
