= Desert rhubarb =

Desert rhubarb is a common name for several desert dwelling plants related to rhubarb and may refer to:

- Rheum palaestinum, native to the Middle East
- Rumex hymenosepalus, native to western North America
