= Hyperoside =

Names
- IUPAC name 3-(β-D-Galactopyranosyloxy)-3′,4′,5,7-tetrahydroxyflavone
- Systematic IUPAC name 2-(3,4-Dihydroxyphenyl)-5,7-dihydroxy-3-{[(2S,3R,4S,5R,6R)-3,4,5-trihydroxy-6-(hydroxymethyl)oxan-2-yl]oxy}-4H-1-benzopyran-4-one
- Other names Hyperozide; Hyperasid; Hyperosid; Hyperin quercetin galactoside Quercetin-3-galactoside; Quercetin-3-O-galactoside

Identifiers
CAS Number	482-36-0
3D model (JSmol)	Interactive image
ChEBI	CHEBI:67486
ChEMBL	ChEMBL251254
ChemSpider	4444962
DrugBank	DB16403
ECHA InfoCard	100.006.892
EC Number	207-580-6
KEGG	C10073
PubChem CID	5281643
UNII	8O1CR18L82
CompTox Dashboard (EPA)	DTXSID501028789
- InChI: InChI=1S/C21H20O12/c22-6-13-15(27)17(29)18(30)21(32-13)33-20-16(28)14-11(26)4-8(23)5-12(14)31-19(20)7-1-2-9(24)10(25)3-7/h1-5,13,15,17-18,21-27,29-30H,6H2/t13-,15+,17+,18-,21+/m1/s1 Key: OVSQVDMCBVZWGM-DTGCRPNFSA-N; InChI=1/C21H20O12/c22-6-13-15(27)17(29)18(30)21(32-13)33-20-16(28)14-11(26)4-8(23)5-12(14)31-19(20)7-1-2-9(24)10(25)3-7/h1-5,13,15,17-18,21-27,29-30H,6H2/t13-,15+,17+,18-,21+/m1/s1 Key: OVSQVDMCBVZWGM-DTGCRPNFBG
- SMILES: c1cc(c(cc1c2c(c(=O)c3c(cc(cc3o2)O)O)O[C@H]4[C@@H]([C@H]([C@H]([C@H](O4)CO)O)O)O)O)O

Properties
Chemical formula	C_{21}H_{20}O_{12}
Molar mass	464.379 g·mol^{−1}
Density	1.879 g/mL
- Except where otherwise noted, data are given for materials in their standard state (at 25 °C [77 °F], 100 kPa). verify (what is ?) Infobox references

Hyperoside is a chemical compound. It is the 3-O-galactoside of quercetin.

== Natural occurrences ==
Hyperoside has been isolated from Drosera rotundifolia, from the Lamiaceae Stachys sp. and Prunella vulgaris, from Rumex acetosella, Cuscuta chinensis seeds, from St John's wort and from Camptotheca acuminata. It is one of the phenolic compounds in the invasive plant Carpobrotus edulis and contributes to the antibacterial properties of the plant.

In Rheum nobile and R. rhaponticum, it serves as a UV blocker found in the bracts.

It is also found in Geranium niveum and Taxillus kaempferi.
