= Mucopurulent discharge =

Secretion of mucus and pus from bodily orifices

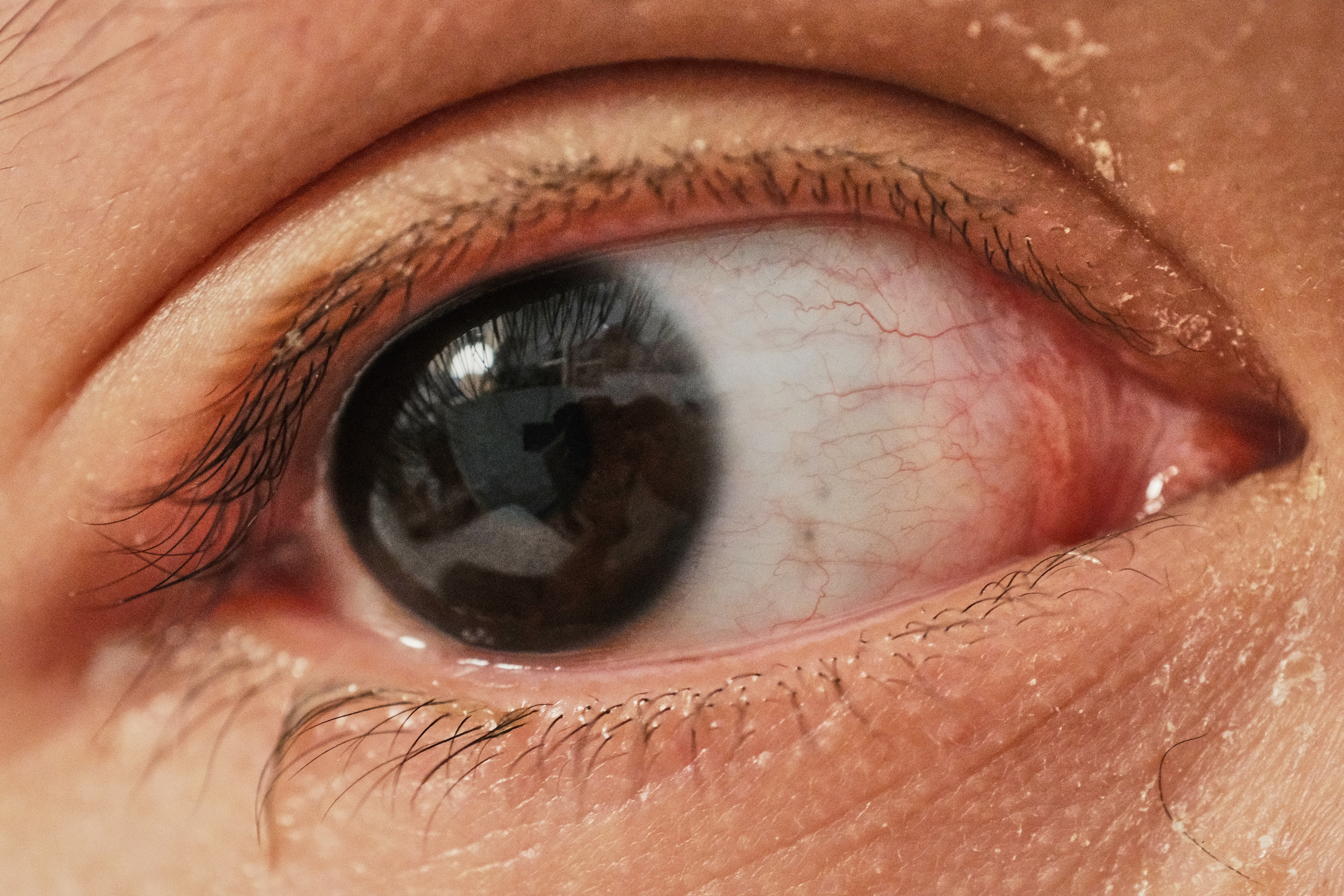
- Mucopurulent discharge in the right eyelid of a male due to a chalazion. Note the still-wet discharge in the lower left of the photo, caught in the lower eyelid, as well as the solidified flaky discharge around the upper eyelid and the area surrounding the medial canthus.
- Causes: Bacterial infection
- Diagnostic method: Based on underlying cause, microbial culture
- Treatment: Antibiotics

Mucopurulent discharge is the emission or secretion of fluid containing mucus and pus (muco- pertaining to mucus and purulent pertaining to pus) from the eye, nose, cervix, vagina or other part of the body due to infection and inflammation. Types include:

- In ophthalmology, mucopurulent discharge from the eyes, and caught in the eyelashes, is a hallmark sign of bacterial conjunctivitis. The normal buildup of tears, mucus, and dirt (compare rheum) that appears at the edge of the eyelids after sleep is not mucopurulent discharge, as it does not contain pus.
- Vaginal discharge
