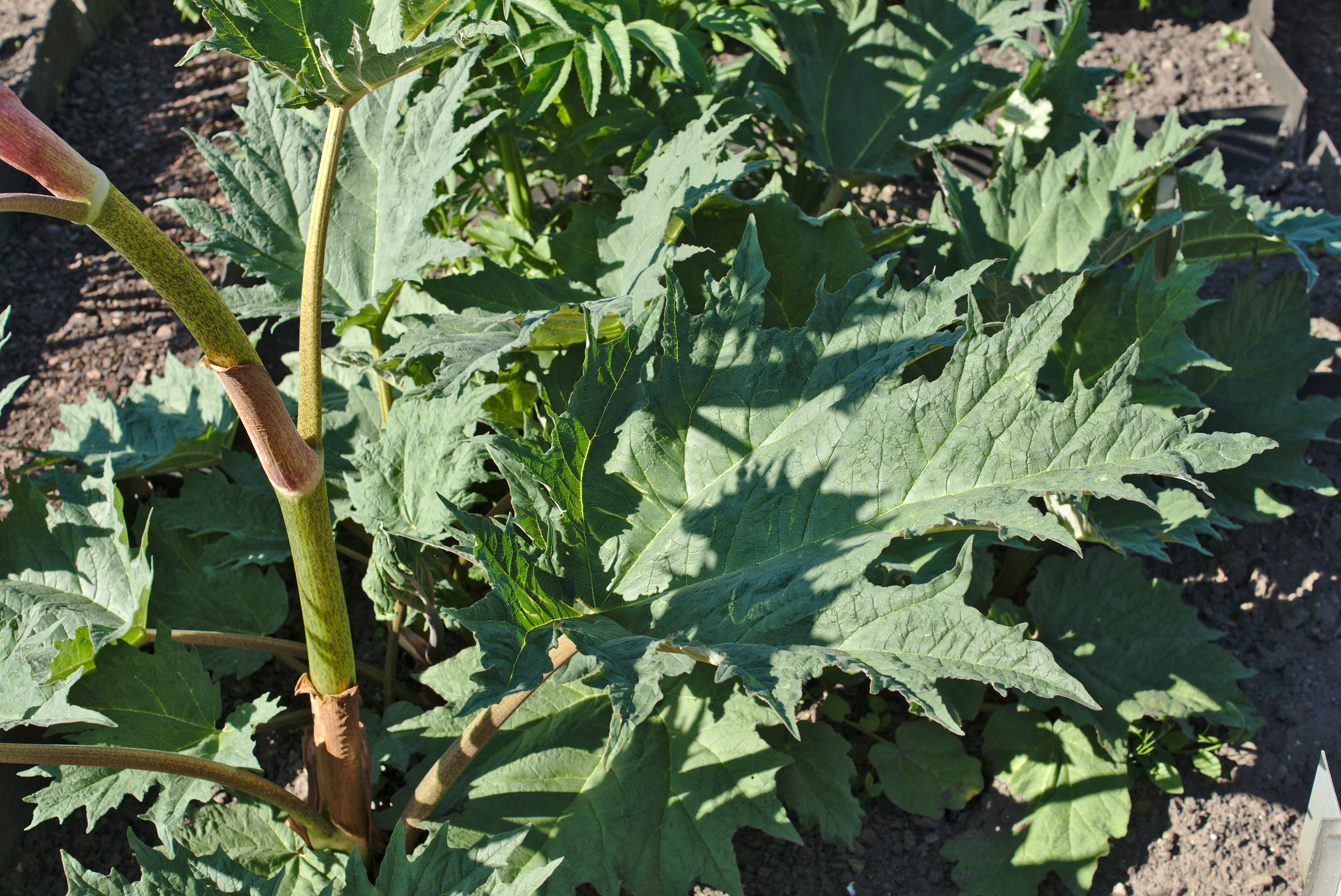

Scientific classification
- Kingdom: Plantae
- Clade: Tracheophytes
- Clade: Angiosperms
- Clade: Eudicots
- Order: Caryophyllales
- Family: Polygonaceae
- Genus: Rheum
- Species: R. palmatum

Binomial name
- Rheum palmatum L.

= Rheum palmatum =

Species of flowering plant

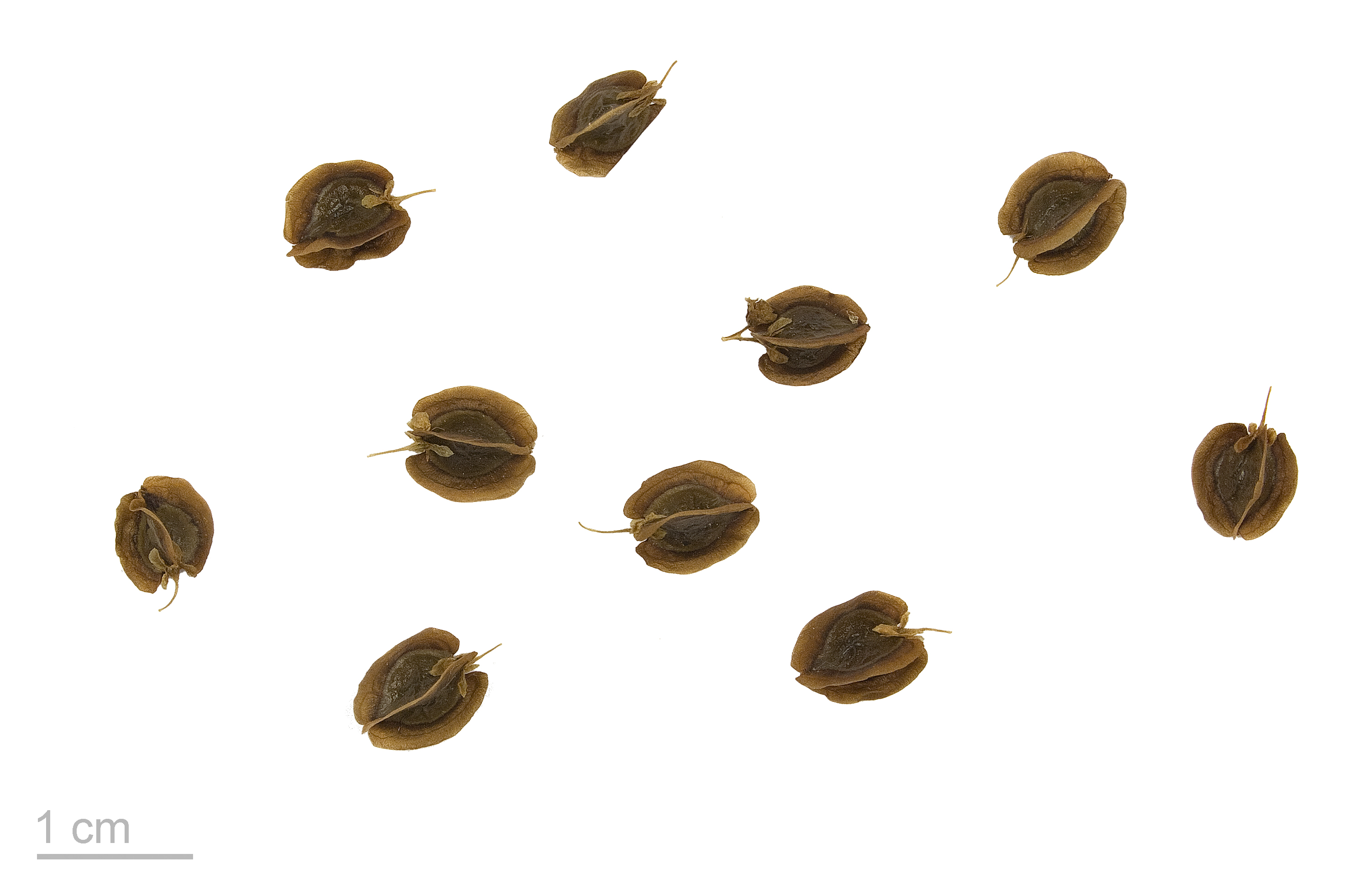
Rheum palmatum

Rheum palmatum is a species of flowering plant in the knotweed family Polygonaceae. It is commonly called Chinese rhubarb, ornamental rhubarb, Turkey rhubarb or East Indian rhubarb.

Rheum palmatum is a herbaceous perennial related to the edible rhubarb. It is primarily used in traditional medicine, and as an ornamental subject in the garden.

== Taxonomy ==
Agnia Losina-Losinskaja proposed classifying it in the section Palmata in the Flora SSSR in 1936. In the 1998 Flora Republicae popularis Sinicae A. R. Li maintains this classification for this species.

== Description ==
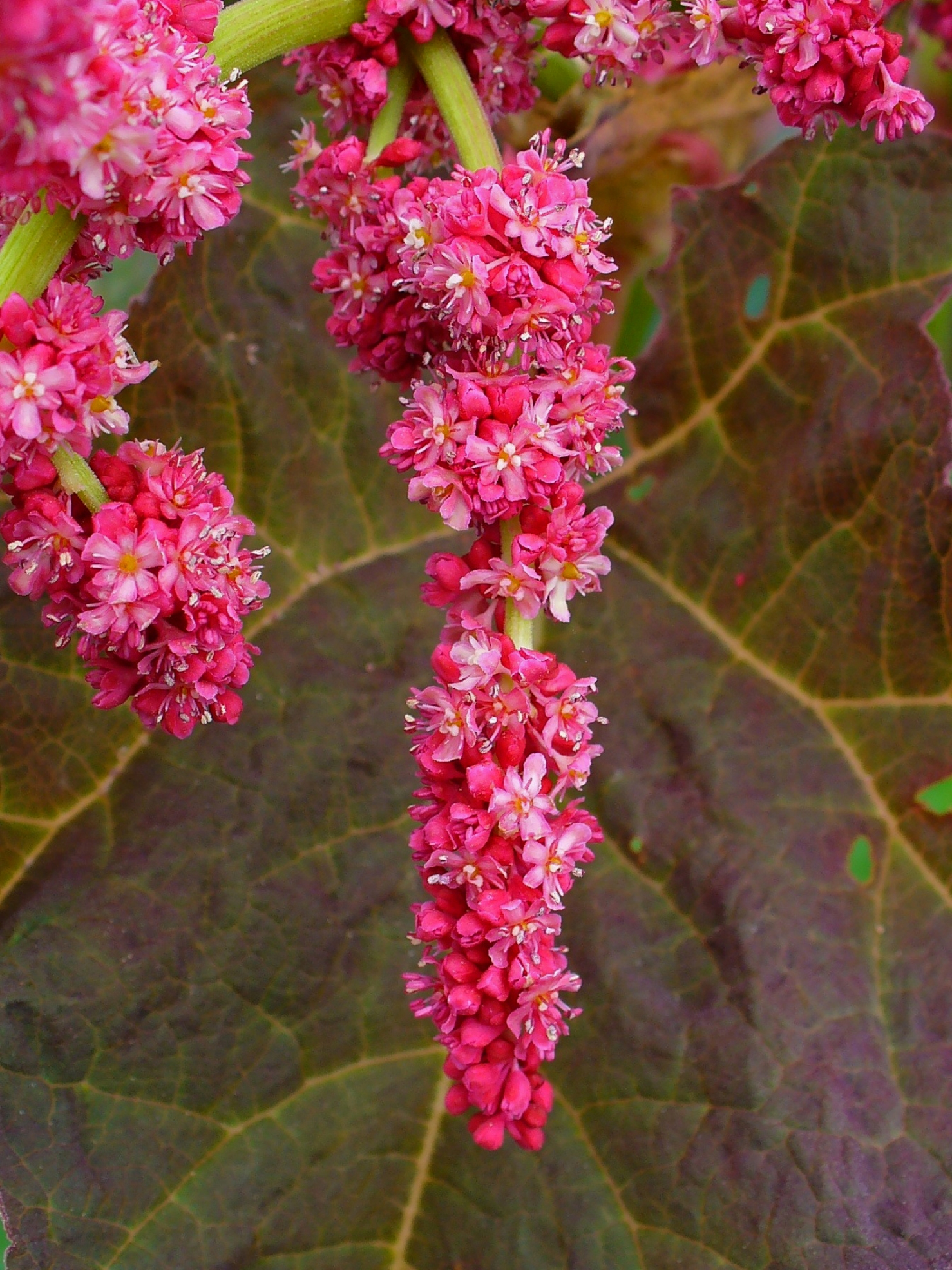
Loosely branched clusters of matured red flowers found on the lobed-leafed Chinese rhubarb.

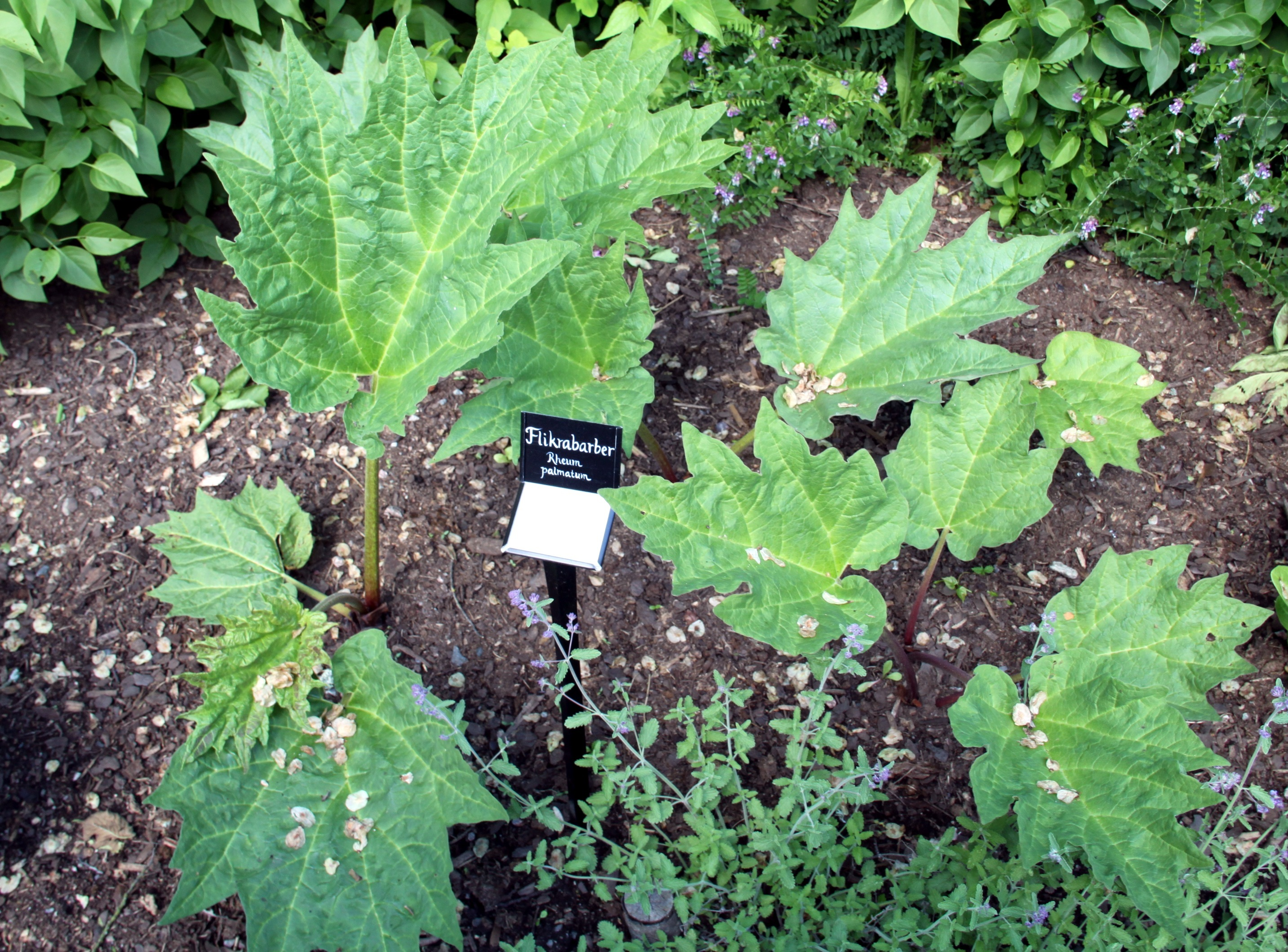
Habit of Rheum palmatum

It is a perennial herbaceous plant growing to 1.5–2 m (4 ft 11 in – 6 ft 7 in) tall. Its lobed leaves are large, jagged and hand-shaped, growing to 40–60 cm (16–24 in) wide and long, occasionally to 100 cm (39 in). The tiny pink flowers are in panicles up to 1.5 m (4 ft 11 in) tall. Chinese rhubarb has thick, deep roots.

=== Similar species ===
The species Rheum tanguticum is closely related to R. palmatum.

R. palmatum can be distinguished from the garden rhubarb R. × hybridum, by size; while garden rhubarb only grows to around a metre in height, Chinese rhubarb can grow to two metres.

=== Karyotypy ===
R. palmatum has a chromosome count of 2n=22.

== Distribution ==
It is native in the regions of western China, northern Tibet, and the Mongolian Plateau.

== Folk medicine ==
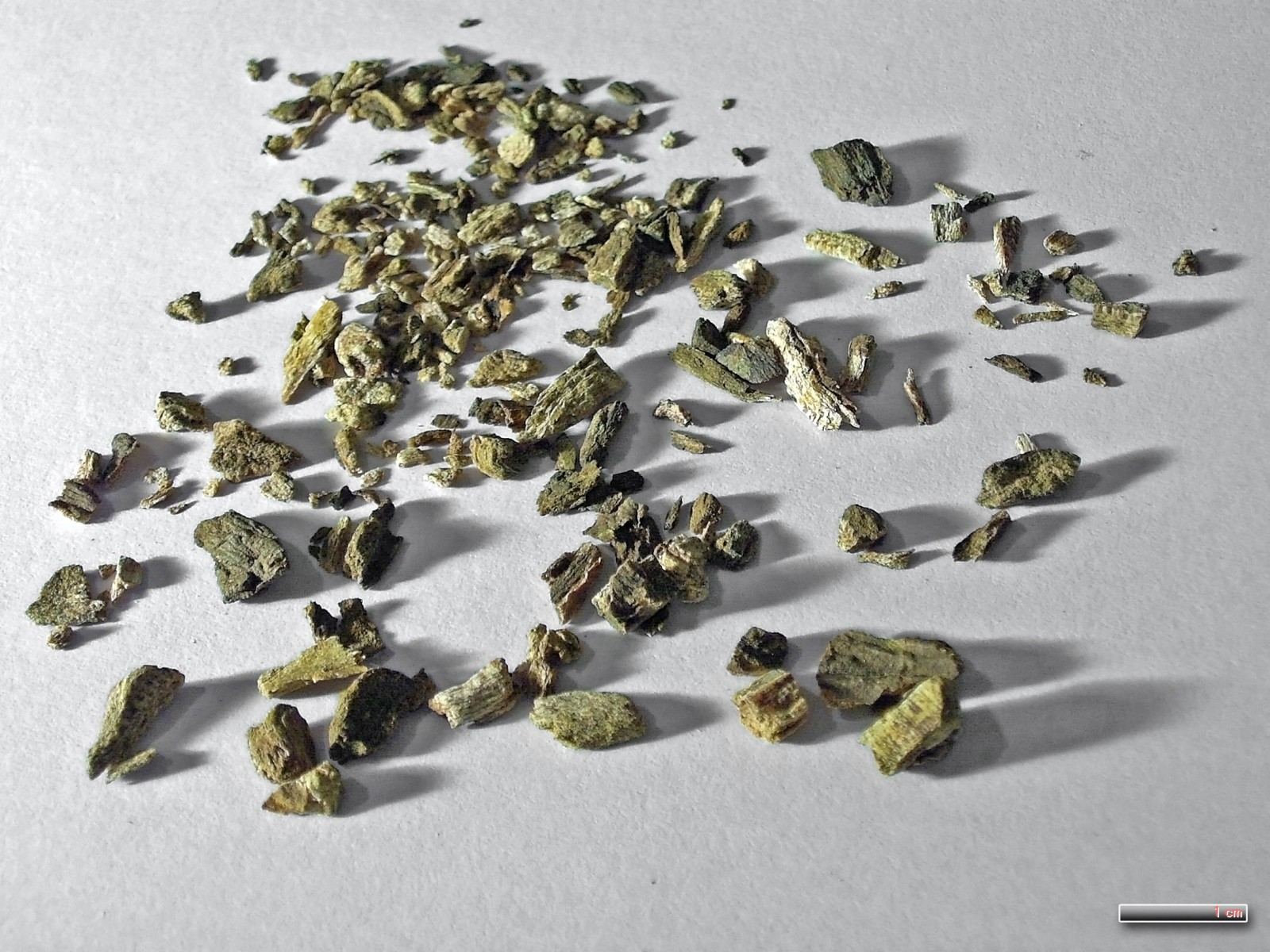
The cut-up and dried root of Chinese rhubarb

Rheum tanguticum, Rheum palmatum, R. rhabarbarum and R. officinale and a few others, are all harvested for their roots, which are used as a herbal medicine. Rheum palmatum (or dahuang) is an important crop that has been used in traditional Chinese medicine for over 2,000 years.

The dried roots of Chinese rhubarb became one of the most prominent items traded along the Silk Road. Imported roots of various rhubarb species were widely used in Europe for hundreds of years before the identity of the plant was eventually discovered. Some of the common names associated with Rheum palmatum – "Russian rhubarb", "Turkey rhubarb", and "Indian rhubarb" – are directly affiliated with the trade routes for rhubarb from China.

The root is known for its purported purging effects and suppressing fever. In ancient China, rhubarb root was taken to try to cure stomach ailments and as a "cathartic" (an agent used to relieve constipation), and used as a poultice for "fevers and edema" (swelling caused by fluid retention in the body tissues). It was given its Latin name by Carolus Linnaeus in the year 1759 and first grown in Britain around 1762.

The first International Symposium on Rhubarb was held in China in 1990. Its objective was to verify the scientific data and treatment of Chinese Rhubarb used by Chinese pharmacopoeias.

=== Health risks ===
Pregnant women should avoid all intake of the plant since it may cause uterine stimulation. If taken for an extended amount of time, adverse effects include: "hypertrophy of the liver, thyroid, and stomach, as well as nausea, griping, abdominal pain, vomiting, and diarrhea."

Though the root of the Chinese rhubarb is a key facet of herbal medicine, its leaves can actually be poisonous if consumed in large amounts due to the oxalic acid content. Patients with "arthritis, kidney problems, inflammatory bowel disease, or intestinal obstruction" should refrain from consumption.

== Cultivation ==
=== Ornamental use ===
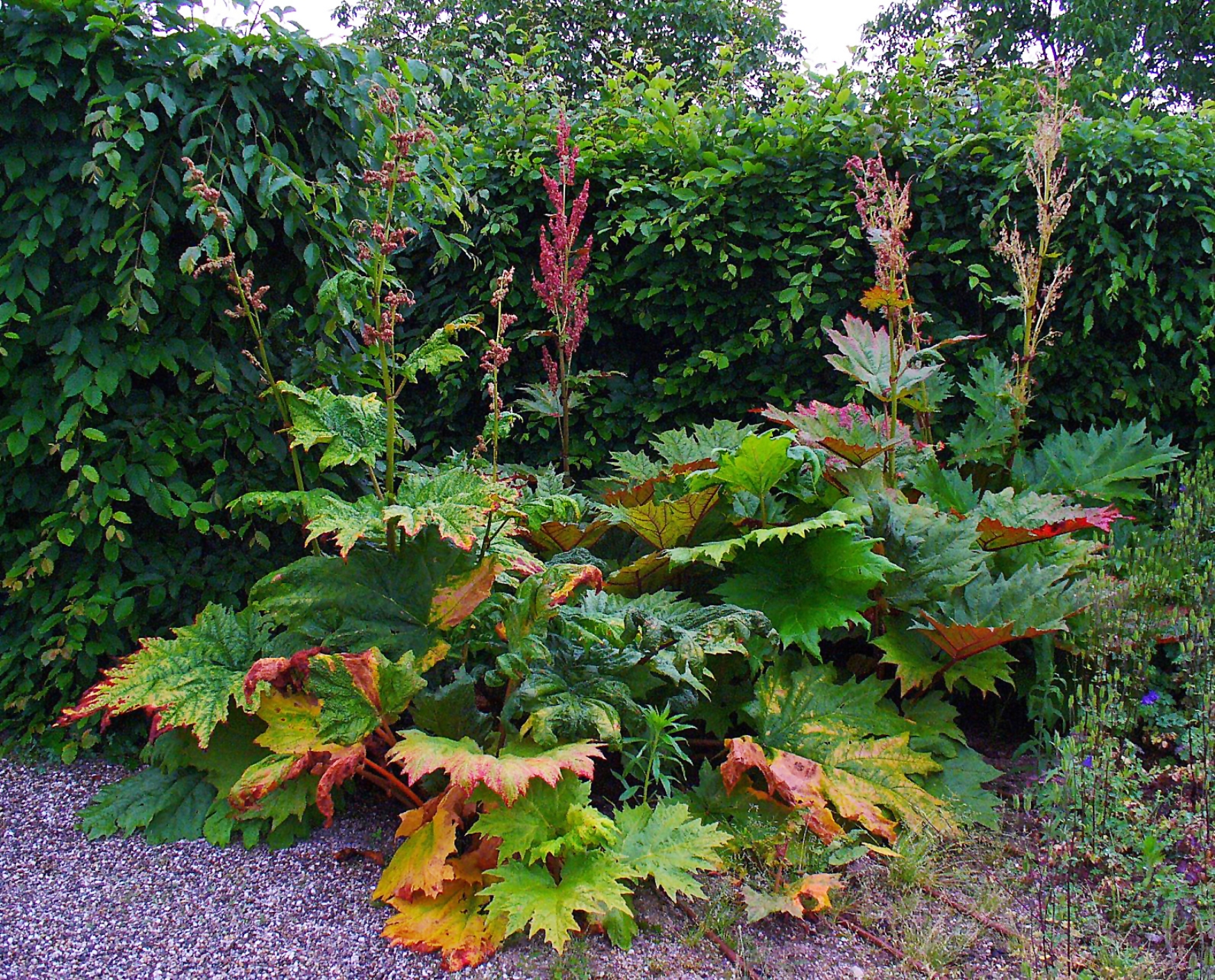

With its large palmate leaves and tall panicles of pink flowers, Rheum palmatum is a bold statement plant for the temperate garden, that grows up to 2.5 m (8.2 ft) tall and broad. It is hardy down to −20 °C (−4 °F). It is propagated by seed in the spring, or by root division in spring or autumn. It grows best in full sunlight in well-drained soil.

The following cultivars have gained the Royal Horticultural Society's Award of Garden Merit:-

- 'Ace of Hearts' – compact cultivar to 1.5 m (4.9 ft)
- 'Bowles's Crimson'
- 'Hadspen Crimson'

=== Farming as medicinal herb ===
Since it is the roots and rhizome which serve as this plant's source of medicinal usage, special care is taken in their preparation. When 6–10 years old, the rhizomes of these plants are removed from the ground in the autumn when both its stems and leaves changed to yellow wild. Furthermore, the lateral rootlets and the crown are removed, leaving only the root. Any debris around the root is cleaned off, the coarse exterior bark removed, and the root cut and divided into cube-like pieces to increase its surface area, thereby decreasing the time needed for drying.
