= Xiangshan, Zhangjiagang =

Mountain in Jiangsu, China

Coordinates: 31°55′51.74″N 120°23′56.93″E

Xiangshan (香山) (Fragrant Hills) is a scenic hill located in the western portion of the city of Zhangjiagang.

== Geography ==
Located 15 kilometers from the center of the city, it is a very convenient destination for tourists. The hill covers about 4.37 square kilometers and has an altitude of 136.6 meters. It has a wide variety of trees such as pinus massoniana, metasequoia glyptostroboides, bamboo, and several fruit trees. Wild medicinal herbs are also found in abundance. The beautiful natural scenery and rich human resources attract many visitors yearly. Xu xia ke, a famous geologist of the Ming Dynasty, often visited Xiangshan and wrote many poems about it.

Through the effort of the government, many scenic spots have been opened to the outside world since 1993, such as Wangjiangting (望江亭), Laohuzui (老虎嘴), Caixiangjing (采香径), Taohuajian (桃花涧) and Shengguotan (圣过潭). In 1995, an investment of 60 million yuan was made in the Xiangshansi (香山寺), which covers an area of about 6700 square meters.

In recent years, with the development of Zhangjiagang, the mountain has gradually become a famous scenic spot and its development is included in the planning of key projects.
