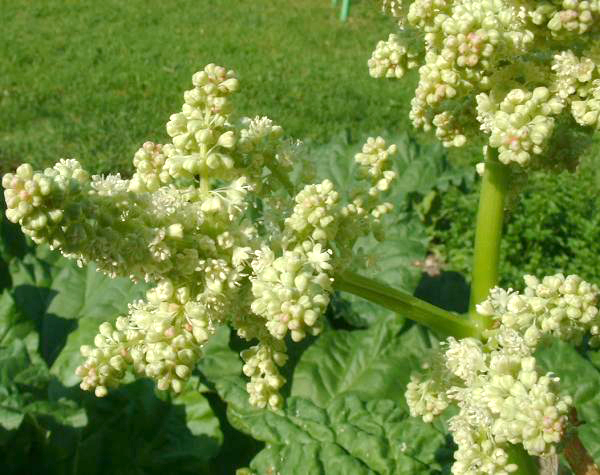

Scientific classification
- Kingdom: Plantae
- Clade: Embryophytes
- Clade: Tracheophytes
- Clade: Spermatophytes
- Clade: Angiosperms
- Clade: Eudicots
- Order: Caryophyllales
- Family: Polygonaceae
- Genus: Rheum
- Species: R. rhaponticum

Binomial name
- Rheum rhaponticum L.

Synonyms
- Rhabarbarum rhaponticum (L.) Moench; Rheum rotundatum Stokes

= Rheum rhaponticum =

False rhubarb

Species of flowering plant

Rheum rhaponticum, the false rhubarb, rhapontic rhubarb or rhapontic, is a plant species in the genus Rheum found in the wild. It is the only Rheum species found only in Europe, and is now restricted to the Rila mountain range in south-western Bulgaria. It was introduced to other countries in Europe. It is considered to be one of the parents of the modern culinary rhubarb.

== Description ==
Rheum rhaponticum is a robust perennial herbaceous plant growing from a woody rhizome. It has large, undivided leaves, with succulent petioles (stalks). The blade of the leaf is up to 50 cm long, and is wider than its length. The leaves are heart-shaped at the base with five prominent nerves. The petioles are concave above and convex below, with about 10 ridges. The flowers are borne in a panicle and are light greenish-yellow in colour. The fruits have membrane-like wings and are about 5 mm long on pedicels (stems) of the same length.

=== Karyotypy ===
In 1928, Jaretzky found R. rhaponticum to have 2n = 44 chromosomes, however, a study of the wild Bulgarian population in 1989 revealed a chromosome number of 2n = 22.

== Taxonomy ==
Rheum rhaponticum was first described by Carl Linnaeus in 1753. Linnaeus knew the plant only from cultivated specimens grown at Uppsala in Sweden and in the Netherlands. These were derived from plants grown the early 17th century in the Padua botanic garden, collected by a former student of the botanic garden, Francisco Crasso, in what was then known as Thrace. Plants from the Rila mountain range have been compared to those in Linnaeus's herbarium and are considered to be the same species. The name Rheum rhaponticum has also been applied in a broad sense to culinary rhubarb.

== History ==
The word rha ponticum, Latin for 'rha from Pontus' (Pontus corresponds to the northern coast of Anatolia), was first mentioned by Dioscorides, who says that this is the name the Romans used for a valued medicinal root imported from the east. Dioscorides also mentions the root is most similar to that of Centaurea.

Throughout most of the Middle Ages and early modern era Europeans were unaware of the source for these roots, which had become known as rheum barbarum (among many other names, including the Persian raved). Botanists such as Leonhart Fuchs (in 1542) and Rembert Dodoens (in 1554) identified a species of thistle in the family Asteraceae, Rhaponticum scariosum, as the source of the root, thus this plant was used to produce an inferior rhubarb.

R. rhaponticum was the first rhubarb plant ever to be seen by Europeans, but it took some time before Europeans accepted that rhubarb was harvested from Rheum.

== Chemistry ==
Hyperoside, the 3-O-galactoside of quercetin, can be found in the bracts of R. rhaponticum, where it may serve as a UV blocker. It also contains the hydroxystilbenes rhaponticin and desoxyrhaponticin.
