= Taldy-Bulak =

Taldy-Bulak Талды-Булак
- Location within Kyrgyzstan
- Coordinates: 42°24′0″N 72°59′40″E
- Country: Kyrgyzstan
- Region: Talas Region
- District: Talas District
- Elevation: 2,022 m (6,634 ft)

Population (2021)
  - Total: 3,615

Taldy-Bulak is a village in the Talas Region of Kyrgyzstan. Its population was 3,615 in 2021.
