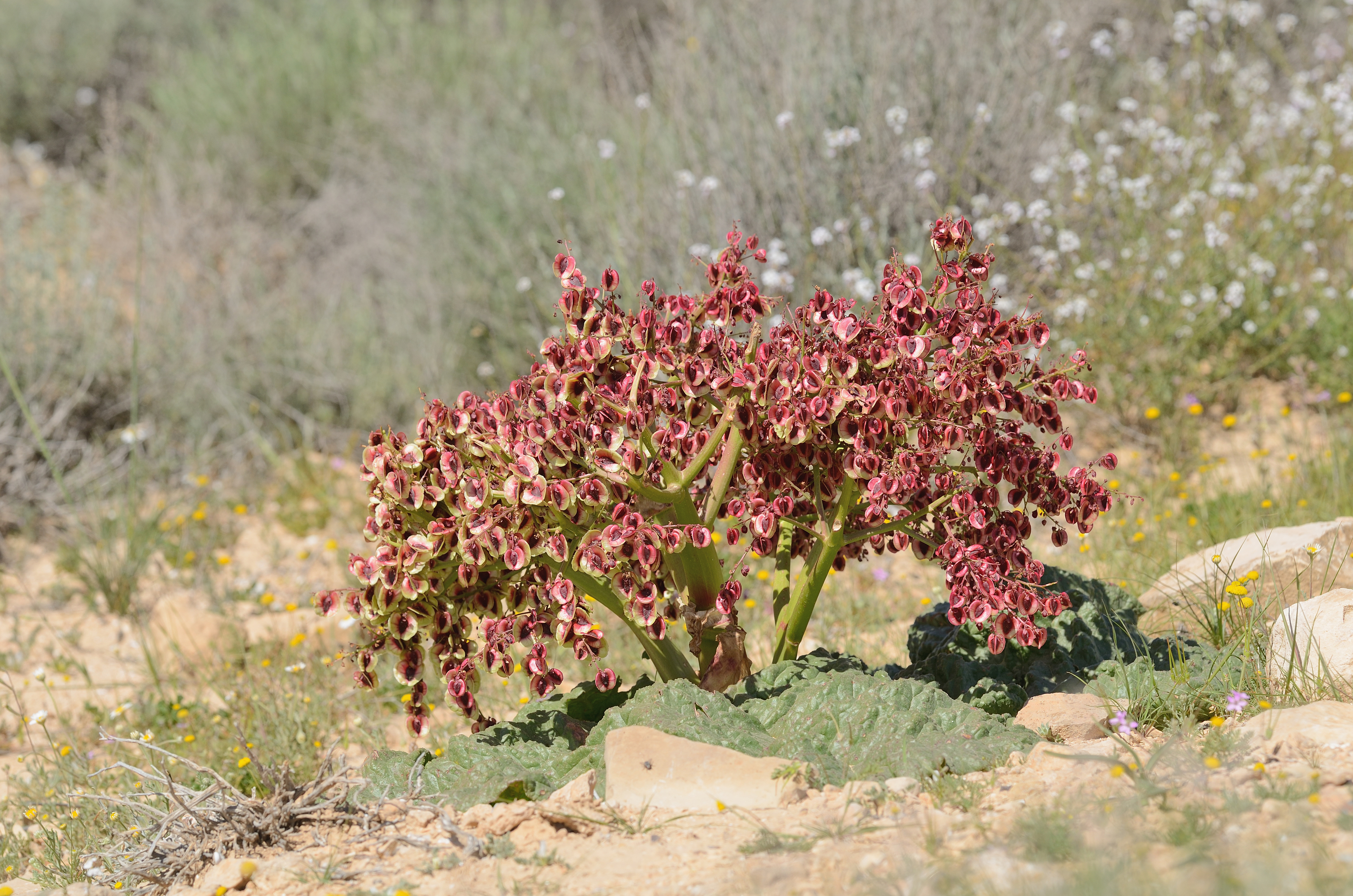

Scientific classification
- Kingdom: Plantae
- Clade: Embryophytes
- Clade: Tracheophytes
- Clade: Spermatophytes
- Clade: Angiosperms
- Clade: Eudicots
- Order: Caryophyllales
- Family: Polygonaceae
- Genus: Rheum
- Species: R. palaestinum

Binomial name
- Rheum palaestinum Feinbrun

= Rheum palaestinum =

Desert rhubarb

Species of plant

Rheum palaestinum, the desert rhubarb, is a plant indigenous to Palestine, Israel and Jordan with a highly developed system for gathering rainwater.

== Description ==
The plant has broad, rigid leaves, with a waxy surface, and channels cut into them that funnel water toward its root, causing deep soil penetration. The wrinkled leaf's unique morphology has been explained as evolving to trap condensed vapor rising from the earth.

== Habitat ==
It grows in rocky ground, on cliffs and amongst desert rocks, usually above 850 metres (2,790 ft), and is generally associated with the plant species Artemisia sieberi.

== Conservation ==
It has been added to Israel's Red List of Rare and Endangered Plants, and is protected in that country by law. In Israel it only occurs in 32 locations in the inaccessible highlands of the western central Negev Desert, in populations numbering from a handful to hundreds. It furthermore also grows in southern Jordan and the mountains of northern Saudi Arabia.
