= Rheum =

Mucus naturally discharged from eyes, nose, or mouth during sleep

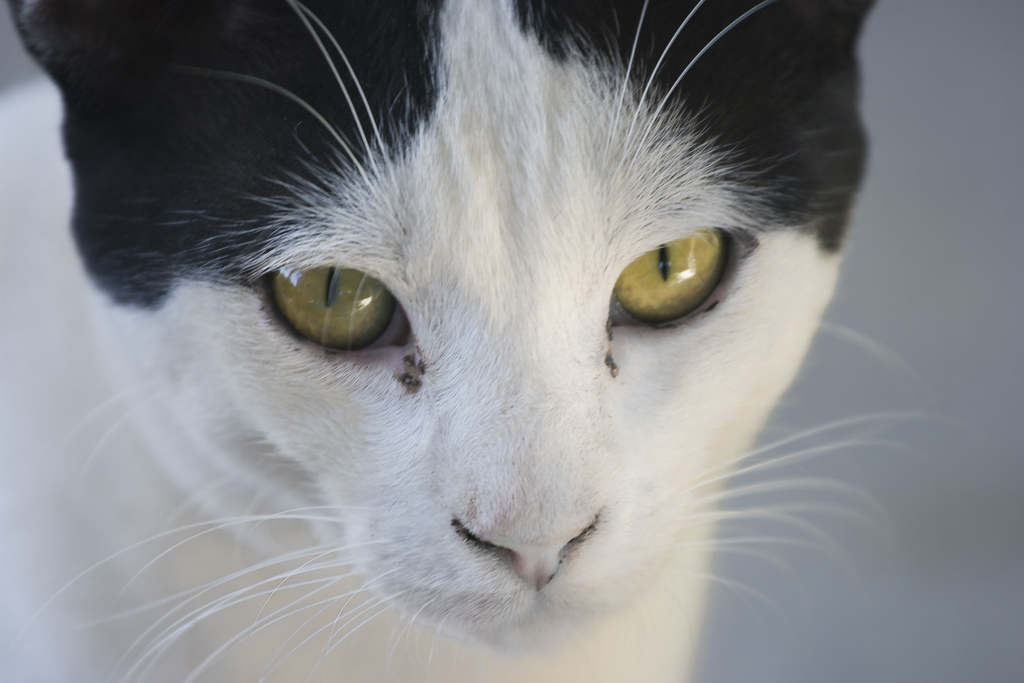
Rheum from a cat's eyes

Rheum (/ruːm/; from Greek: ῥεῦμα rheuma 'a flowing, rheum') is a thin mucus naturally discharged from the eyes, nose, or mouth, often during sleep (contrast with mucopurulent discharge). Rheum dries and gathers as a crust in the corners of the eyes or the mouth, on the eyelids, or under the nose. It is formed by a combination of mucus (in the case of the eyes, consisting of mucin discharged from the cornea or the conjunctiva), nasal mucus, blood cells, skin cells, or dust.

Rheum from the eyes is particularly common. Dried rheum near the eyes is commonly called 'sleep', 'sleepy-seeds', 'sleepy buds', 'sleepy sand', 'eye boogers', 'eye goop', 'sleepies', or 'eye gunk'. When the individual is awake, blinking of the eyelid causes rheum to be washed away with tears via the nasolacrimal duct. The absence of this action during sleep, however, results in a small amount of dry rheum accumulating in corners of the eye.

== Medical conditions ==
A number of conditions can increase the production of rheum in the eye. In the case of allergic conjunctivitis, the buildup of rheum can be considerable, preventing the patient from opening one or both of the eyes upon waking without prior cleansing of the eye area. The presence of pus in an instance of heavy rheum buildup can indicate dry eye or conjunctivitis, among other infections.

== Management and treatment ==
In both humans and animals, small amounts of clear or dark rheum are a normal biological function and generally do not require medical intervention. It is safely managed through regular hygiene.

For humans, accumulated rheum can be gently washed away using a clean, warm, and damp washcloth. It is advised to avoid forcefully rubbing the eyes with bare hands, as this can introduce bacteria and lead to infections such as conjunctivitis. If the discharge becomes excessive, changes to a green or yellow color, or is accompanied by pain or redness, medical treatment may be necessary. Underlying causes such as allergies may be treated with antihistamines, while bacterial infections may require antibiotic eye drops.

In domestic animals, such as cats and dogs, a small amount of dark brown or crusty rheum in the corners of the eyes is typical. This can be cleaned by gently wiping outward from the inner corner of the eye using a warm, damp cotton ball or soft cloth. Using separate cotton balls or cloths for each eye is recommended to prevent the potential spread of infection. If the animal's eye discharge becomes thick, purulent (yellow or green), or if the animal exhibits symptoms like squinting, redness, or pawing at the eye, veterinary attention is required. Such symptoms often indicate underlying issues like feline upper respiratory infections, corneal ulcers, or blocked tear ducts, which may require prescription medications or specialized care.

== See also ==
- Mucopurulent discharge
