= Agnia Losina-Losinskaja =

Soviet botanist (1903–1958)

Agnia Sergeyevna Losina-Losinskaja
- Born: 1903; Russia
- Died: 1958 (aged 54–55)
- Scientific career
- Fields: Botany
- Author abbrev. (botany): Losinsk.

Agnia Sergeyevna Losina-Losinskaja (Агния Сергеевна Лозина-Лозинская) (1903–1958) was a Soviet botanist. Her family name is also transcribed as Lozina-Lozinscaia, and Lozina-Lozinskaja.

She is the author or co-author of the botanical names of at least 216 taxa, including species of Calligonum, Cortusa, Fragaria, Micranthes and Rheum, as well as Galanthus woronowii and the synonym Muscarimia muscari. Two economically important crop plants were amongst her interests. She produced a monograph on Rheum (rhubarb), suggesting that the genus had two primary centres of origin: the older being in China, the younger in Iran, spreading later into Central Asia. She also wrote a review of the genus Fragaria (strawberries). She contributed to a number of volumes of the Flora of the USSR, such as Volume IX, both in the text and as an illustrator. In a memoir by the botanist Anastasia Semenova-Tian-Shanskaja, she is referred to as the favourite student of Vladimir Komarov, after whom the Komarov Botanical Institute is named and who was the senior editor of the Flora of the USSR until his death in 1945.
