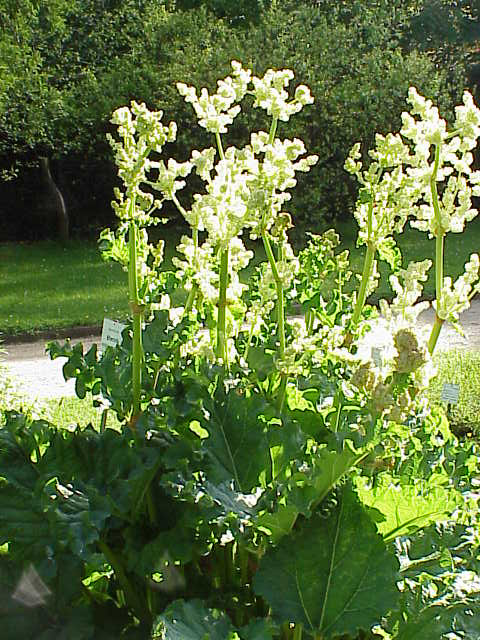

Scientific classification
- Kingdom: Plantae
- Clade: Tracheophytes
- Clade: Angiosperms
- Clade: Eudicots
- Order: Caryophyllales
- Family: Polygonaceae
- Genus: Rheum
- Species: R. officinale

Binomial name
- Rheum officinale Baill.

= Rheum officinale =

Species of flowering plant

Rheum officinale, the Chinese rhubarb, or Indian rhubarb is a rhubarb from the family Polygonaceae native to western China and Tibet. In Chinese it is called yào yòng dà huáng (Chinese: 药用大黄), literally meaning medicinal rhubarb.

== Description ==
A perennial typically to 2 m (6 ft 7 in) in height. but occasionally the flower stalk peduncle is as much as 3 m (9.8 ft) in height. The huge round or kidney-shaped leaves (laminae) are up to 75 cm (30 in) diameter.

=== Karyotypy ===
R. officinale has a chromosome count of 2n=44.

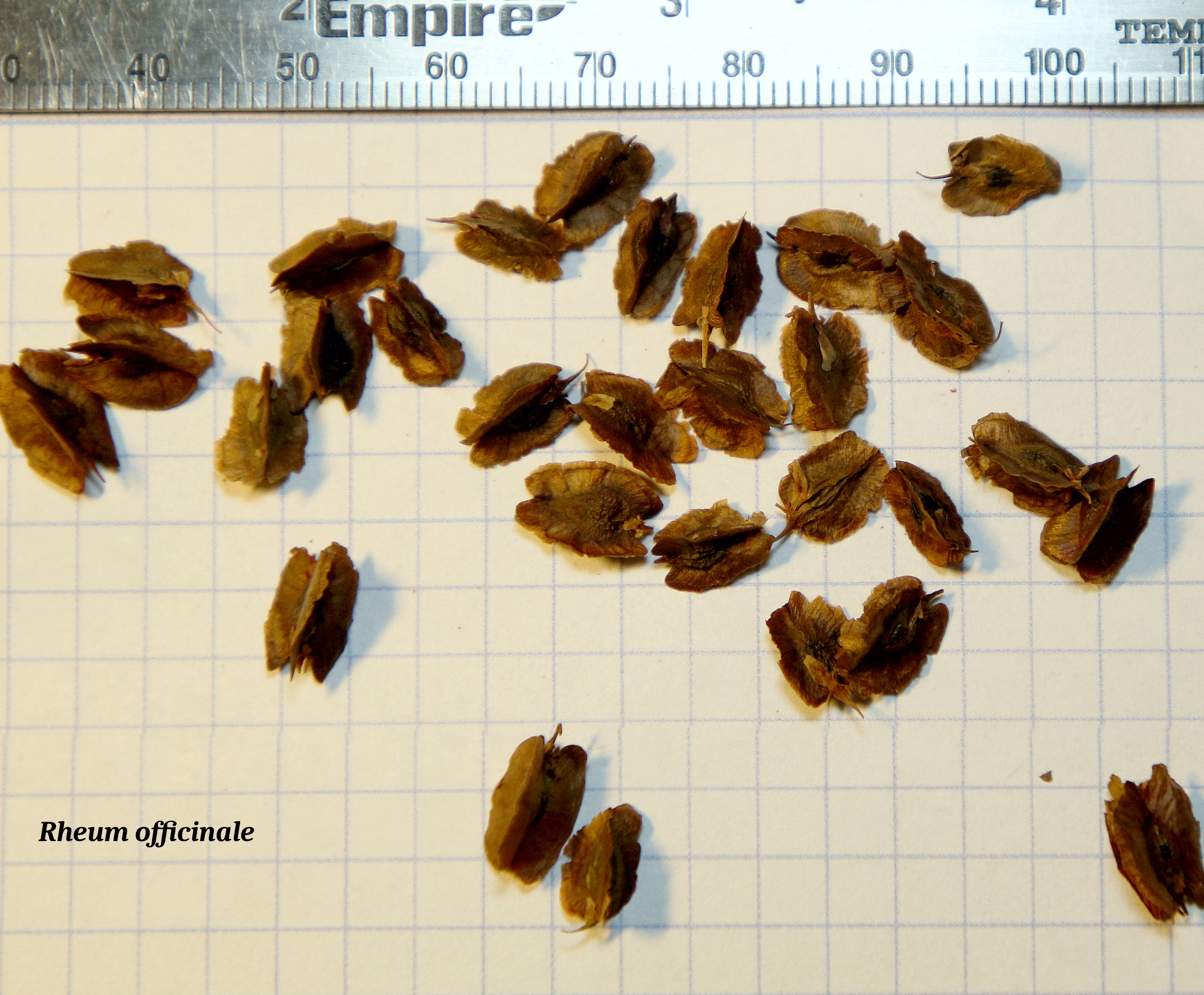
Rheum officinale seeds

== Distribution ==
This species is endemic to southeast China, where it occurs in the provinces of Guizhou, southwestern Henan, western Hubei, Shaanxi, Sichuan, Yunnan and possibly Fujian.

== Uses ==
Leaf petiole said to be edible raw or cooked.

In Indonesia, especially in Java where it is known as klembak in Javanese, and it is usually dried, and mixed with tobacco and frankincense to create a rokok klembak menyan, a traditional Javanese frankincense cigarette.

=== Traditional medicinal uses ===
The roots of Rheum officinale are used in traditional Chinese medicine. They are considered as a kind of "cold" herbs, used as a laxative in patients with constipation, sometimes accompanied by fever and even delirium. It is thought that rhubarbs can improve poor circulation, especially being helpful to remove bodily aggregates which result from poor circulation.

In Chinese traditional medicine, R. officinale, in combination with a large variety of other herbs and modern medicine, has been used for the treatment of hepatitis B, although the results were found to be inconclusive.

== Cultivation ==
Hardy to USDA Zone 7.

== See also ==
- Chinese herbology 50 fundamental herbs
