= Forcing (horticulture) =

Horticultural practice

Forcing is the horticultural practice of bringing a cultivated plant into active growth outside of its natural growing season. Plants do not produce new growth or flowers (and hence fruit) during the winter, and many species only produce flowers or fruit for a very limited period. Forcing allows horticulturalists to produce these flowers and fruits at other times. This can be accomplished by cultural, physical, or chemical means, and is typically done to produce out-of-season flowers or fruit for display, consumption or sale. Forcing allows the more predictable production of products for sale, and can improve the quality of the products in some cases.

Plants respond to different types of cues to break dormancy. Forcing usually involves manipulating the temperature of the plants. Forcing a certain plant may mean it needs a certain amount of time experiencing very cold weather, or experiencing hot weather prior to cold weather. They may also need to have a wet period or a dry period separately from or in conjunction with those temperature fluctuations. For example, exposing the dormant roots of some geophytic plants, such as tulips, to a combination of cold temperatures and moisture immediately prior to warm temperatures is an effective method of forcing them into flower. Exposing woody plants, such as fruit trees, to warmer conditions than are normal in the area--such as growing them in a warm microclimate--forces them to flower and fruit earlier than usual. Cuttings taken in the fall can be moved indoors to force them into bud break.

Pruning during the growing season is an effective way to force some plants, such as asparagus, which are grown for their new shoots.

Forcing as a horticultural technique has been recorded as early as 1608. Historically, rotting manure was used to create hotbeds which would provide warmer temperatures, allowing some or all of a farmer or gardener's crop to ripen earlier than it would in the open air. Cold frames and greenhouses are also methods of warming plants in order to force them. Greenhouses that were used specifically for growing off-season plants were sometimes known as forcing houses.

In the Rhubarb Triangle area of West Yorkshire, England, forced rhubarb is commercially grown in dark sheds and harvested by candlelight. The name "Yorkshire Forced Rhubarb" was granted Protected Designation of Origin (PDO) status by the European Union in 2010. Rhubarb plants can also be grown under a rhubarb forcer, traditionally a ceramic pot which excludes the light.

== See also ==
- Blanching (horticulture)
- Vernalization
- Houseplant
