= Catechin glucoside =

Catechin glucoside may refer to:

- Catechin-3-O-glucoside
- Catechin-3'-O-glucoside
- Catechin-4'-O-glucoside
- Catechin-5-O-glucoside
- Catechin-7-O-glucoside
