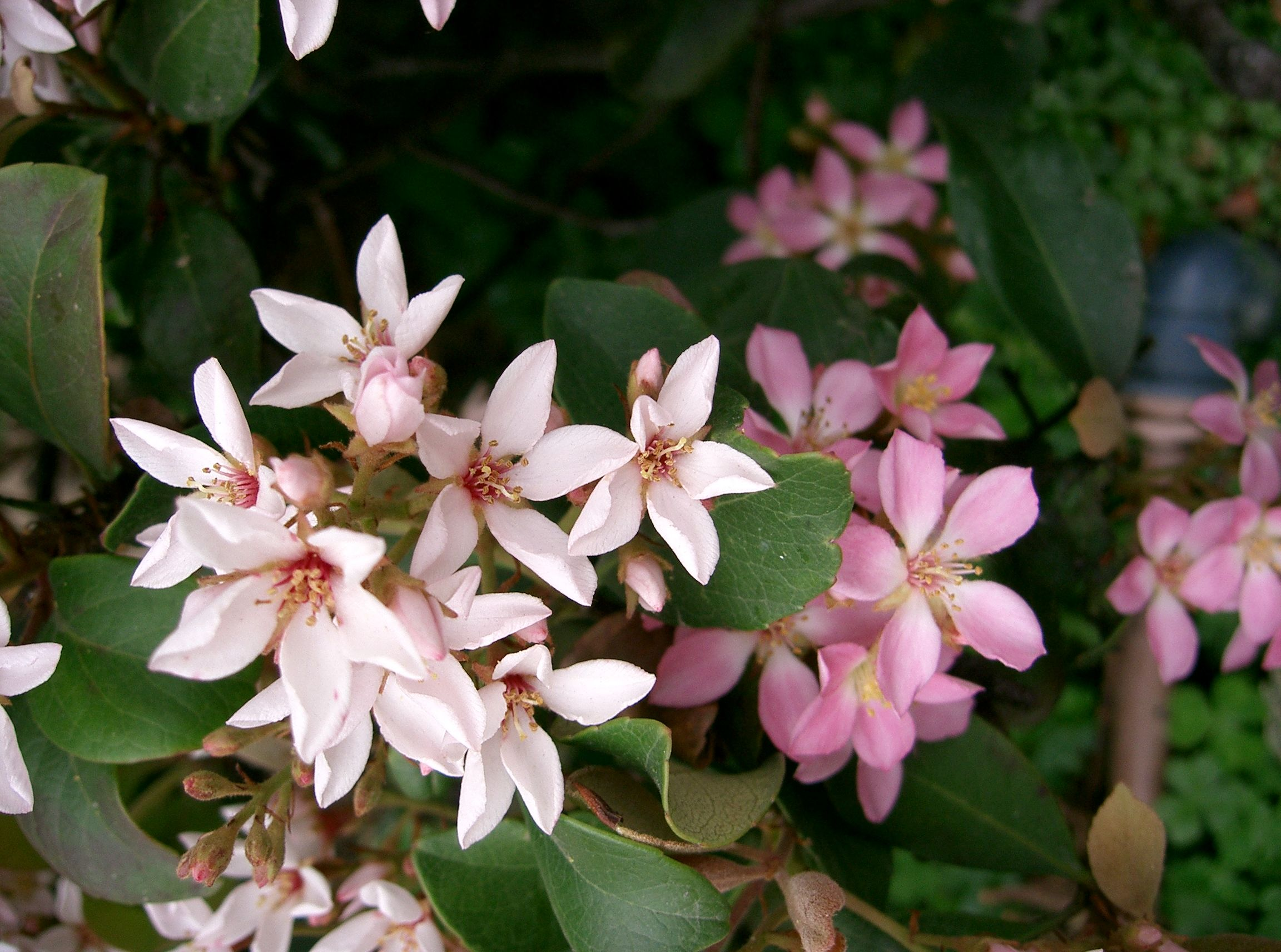

Scientific classification
- Kingdom: Plantae
- Clade: Tracheophytes
- Clade: Angiosperms
- Clade: Eudicots
- Clade: Rosids
- Order: Rosales
- Family: Rosaceae
- Genus: Rhaphiolepis
- Species: R. umbellata

Binomial name
- Rhaphiolepis umbellata Makino

Synonyms
- Laurus umbellata Thunb.; Mespilus sieboldii Blume; Rhaphiolepis indica f. umbellata (Thunb.) Hatus.; Rhaphiolepis indica var. umbellata (Thunb.) H. Ohashi; Rhaphiolepis japonica var. integerrima Hook. f.; Rhaphiolepis ovata Briot

= Rhaphiolepis umbellata =

Species of flowering plant

Rhaphiolepis umbellata or Sexton's bride is a species of flowering plant in the family Rosaceae, native to Korea, Japan and Taiwan. Growing to 1.5 m (5 ft) tall and wide, it is an evergreen shrub with glossy oval leaves, and scented white flowers, sometimes tinged with pink, in early summer.

This plant has gained the Royal Horticultural Society's Award of Garden Merit. It is used in Japan as an astringent and a dyeing agent. The bark contains (−)-catechin 7-O-β-d-glucopyranoside and (+)-catechin 5-0-β-d-glucopyranoside.

== Uses ==
Known as Sharinbai (車輪梅) in Japan and as Techigi in Amami Oshima, this plant is used to create a dye to create the highly valued Ōshima-tsumugi kimono. The bark of the tree is chopped into chips and boiled for over 10 hours. This tannin rich decoction serves as a dye for the silk threads. After dyeing, the threads are then dyed in mud from paddy fields rich in iron content for post-mordanting until they turn black.

Additionally, due to its resilience to drying and air pollution, Sharinbai trees are planted along roadsides. Their glossy evergreen leaves make them suitable for garden planting, enduring well against frequent pruning.

Unlike most of Rhaphiolepis species, its fruits are inedible.

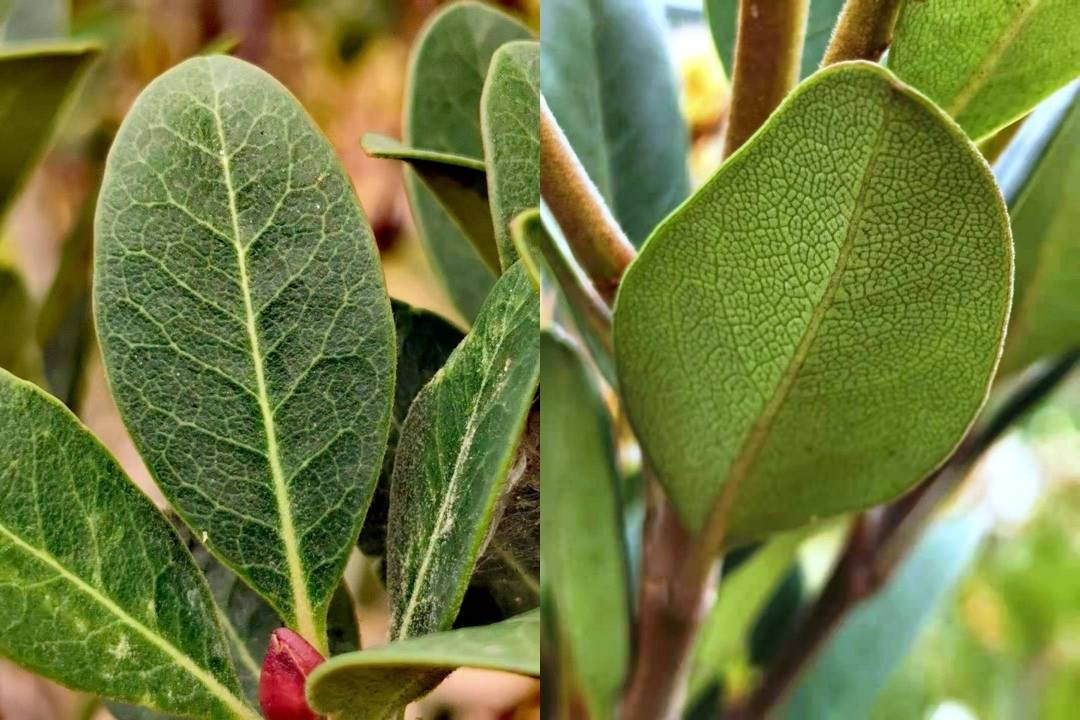
The veins of the leaves are obvious and special.

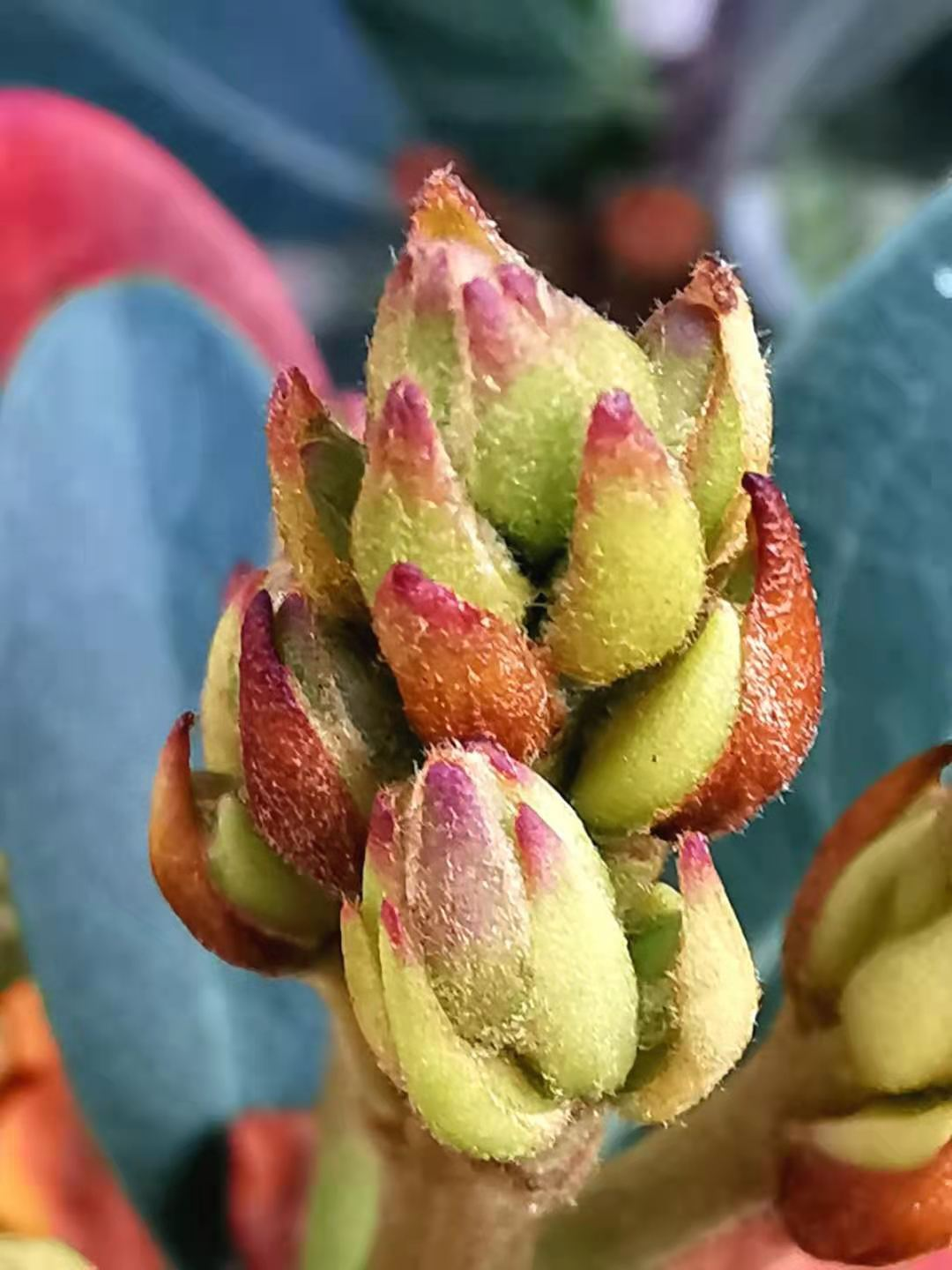
The sprouts are covered with white fluff.

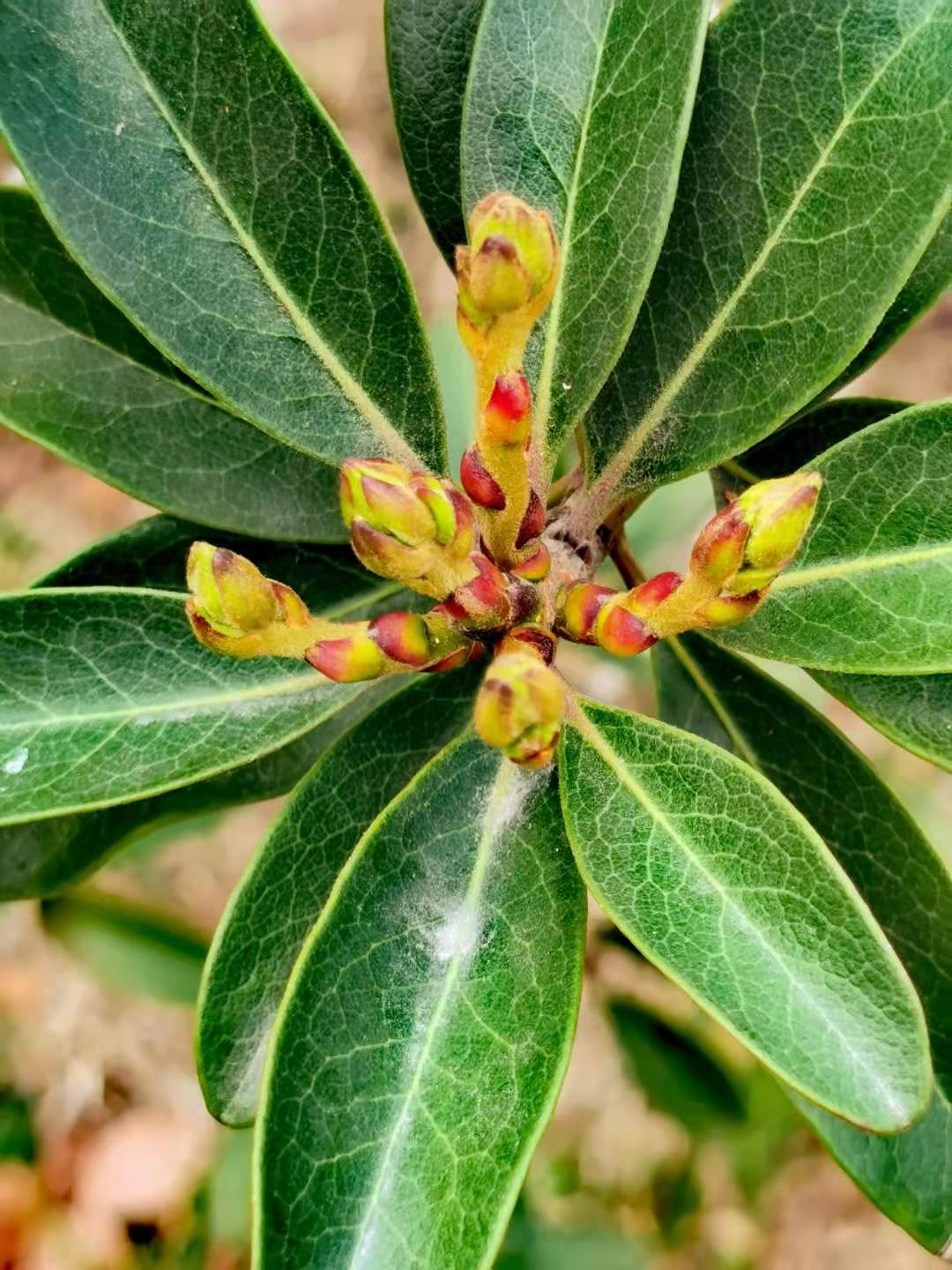
The sprouts and the leaves.

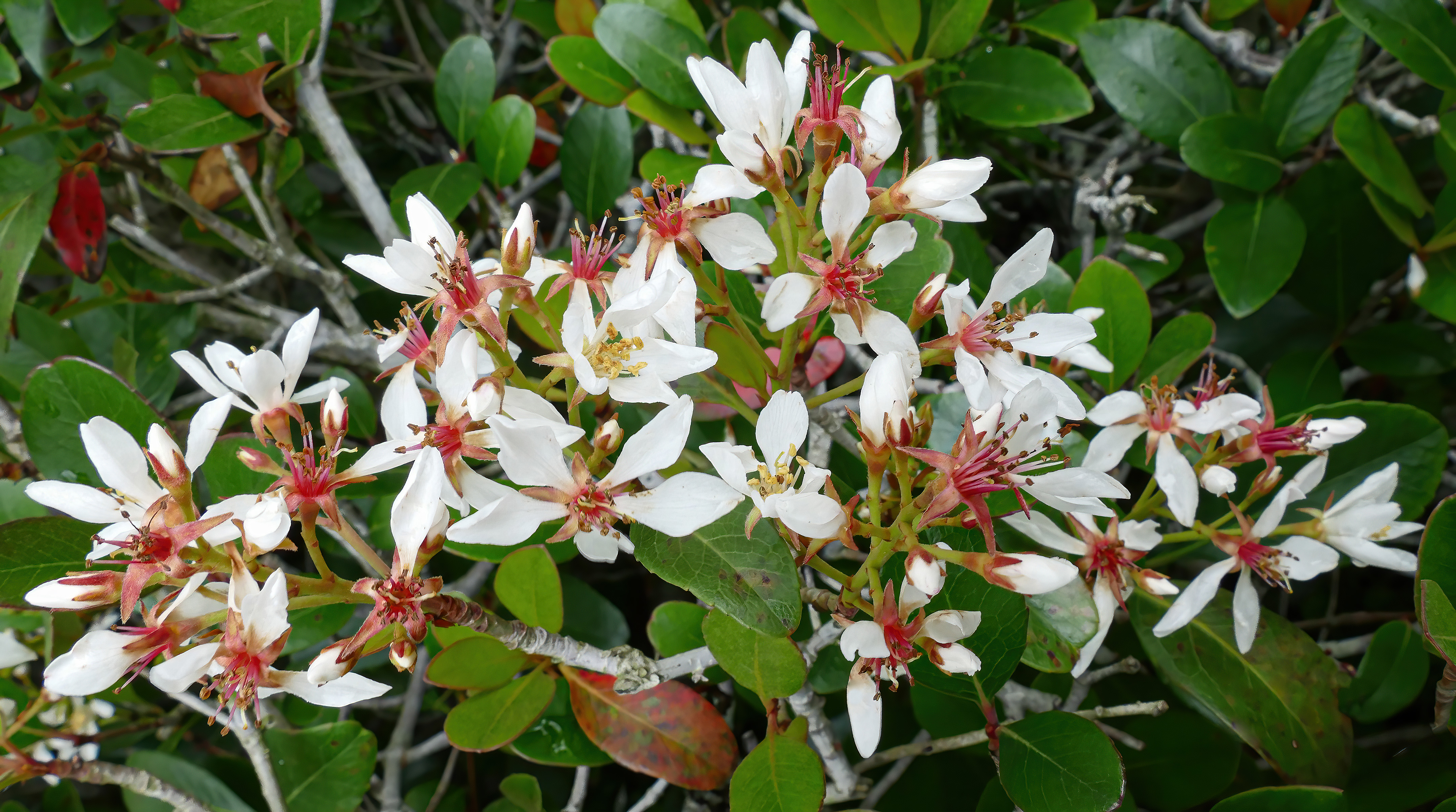

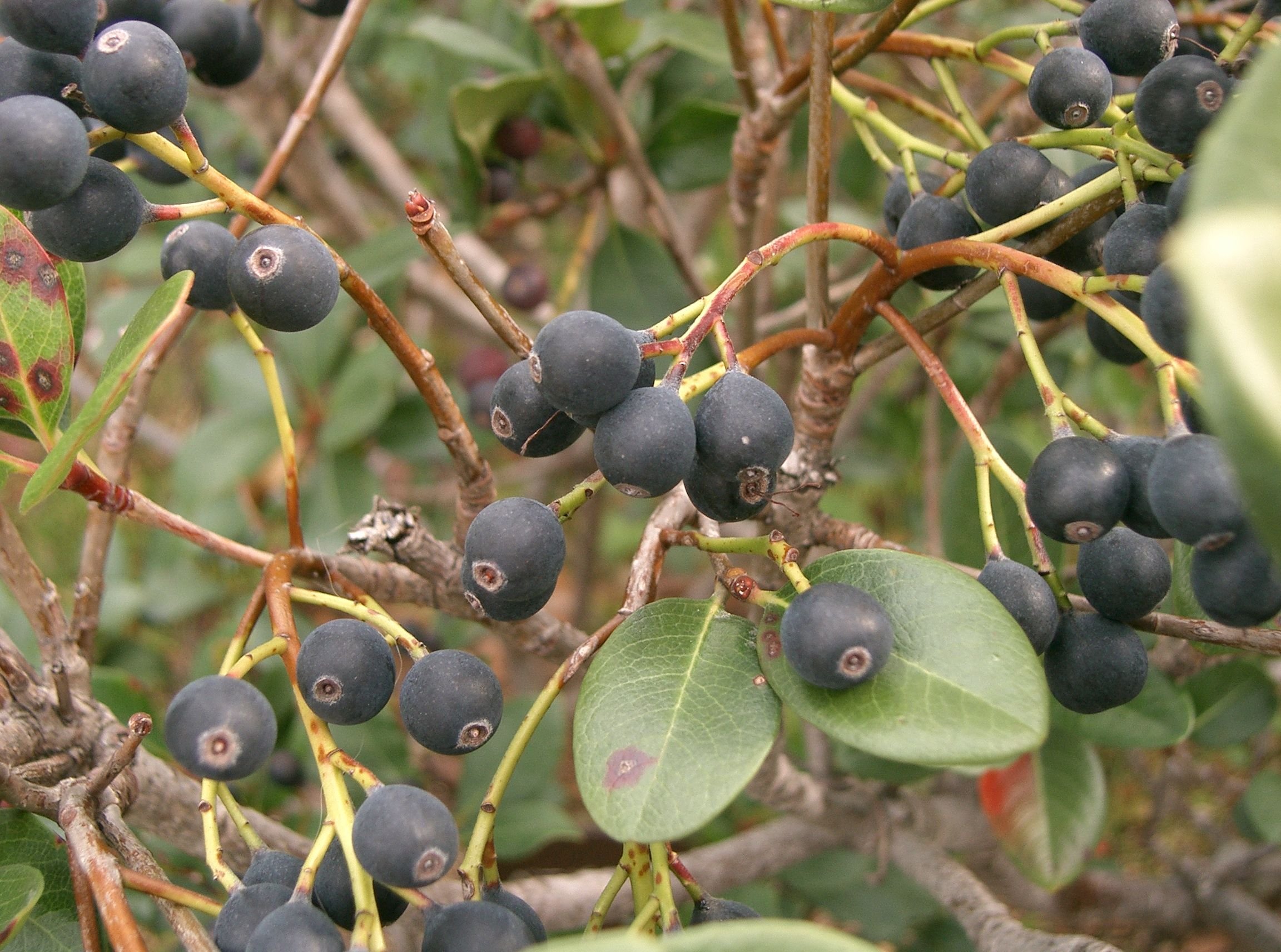
Fruits look somewhat like little figs.
