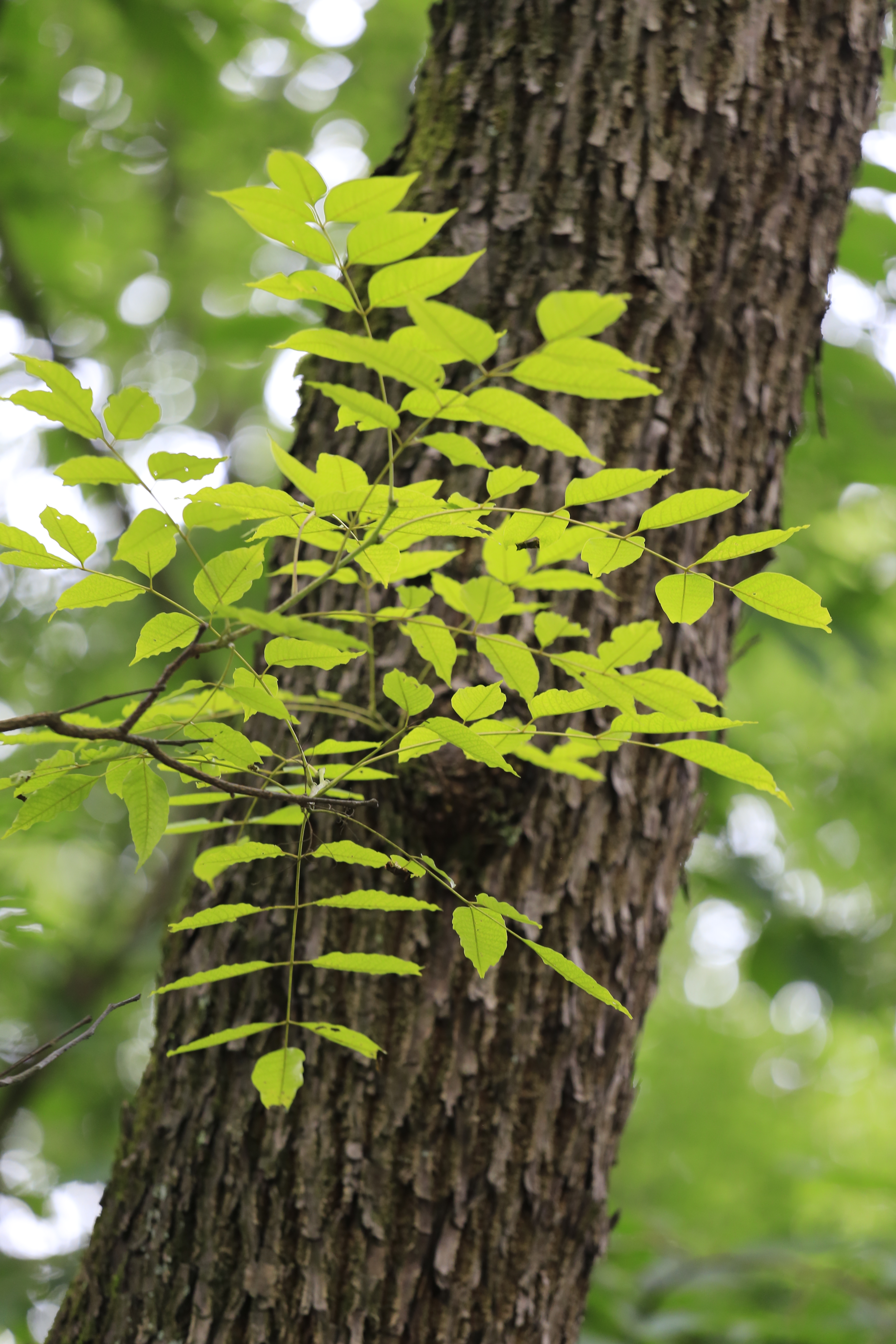
- At Hangzhou Botanical Garden

Scientific classification
- Kingdom: Plantae
- Clade: Tracheophytes
- Clade: Angiosperms
- Clade: Eudicots
- Clade: Rosids
- Order: Sapindales
- Family: Anacardiaceae
- Genus: Choerospondias; B.L.Burtt & A.W.Hill (1937)
- Species: C. axillaris

Binomial name
- Choerospondias axillaris (Roxb.) B.L.Burtt & A.W.Hill (1937)

Varieties
- Choerospondias axillaris var. axillaris; Choerospondias axillaris var. japonica (Ohwi) Ohwi; Choerospondias axillaris var. pubinervis (Rehder & E.H.Wilson) B.L.Burtt & A.W.Hill

Synonyms
- Poupartia axillaris (Roxb.) King & Prain (1901); Spondias axillaris Roxb. (1832)

= Choerospondias =

Nepali hog plum

Species of tree

Choerospondias axillaris, known in English as the Nepali hog plum, is a tree in the family Anacardiaceae. It is the sole species in genus Choerospondias. It is native to the central and eastern Himalayas in Nepal, Bhutan and northeastern India, and Indochina, southern and north-central China, Taiwan, and Japan. It is a common fruit in Nepal and Bhutan, which is called lapsi (लप्सी) in Nepali, aamli in Newar, and phrumchung in eastern Bhutan.

This is a deciduous tree growing up to 20 metres (66 ft) tall. The smaller branches are purple-brown. The compound leaves are up to 40 cm (16 in) long and divided into 3 to 6 papery oval leaflets each up to 12 cm × 4.5 cm (4.7 in × 1.8 in). The tree is dioecious, with male and female trees producing different types of inflorescence. Male flowers occur in long clusters and have curving, brown-veined petals about 3 millimeters long. Female flowers are solitary in leaf axils at the tips of branches. They are larger than the male flowers and yield the edible drupe. The fallen fruit are consumed and dispersed by sambar and barking deer. The fruit is also used in religious ceremonies as an offering.

Its fruit is about 3 cm long and has a soft whitish sour flesh and green to yellow skin. The fruit is made into pickles, fruit tarts, and sour, spicy candy. The tree has long been cultivated for its fruit. The fruit is nutritious and has a price comparable to the mandarin orange on the Nepalese market.

Besides fruit, the tree yields valuable wood and hard seeds which are burned for fuel, and has parts used medicinally in Vietnam and Tibet.

Catechin-7-O-glucoside can be found in the stem barks of C. axillaris.

== Gallery ==
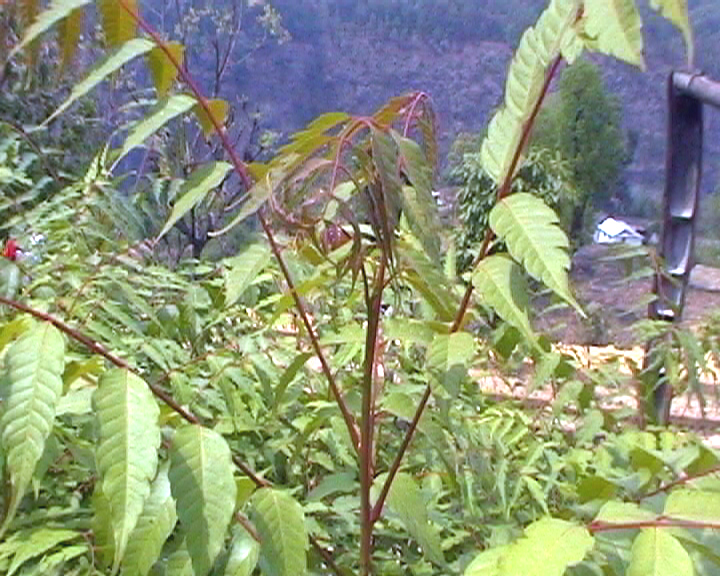

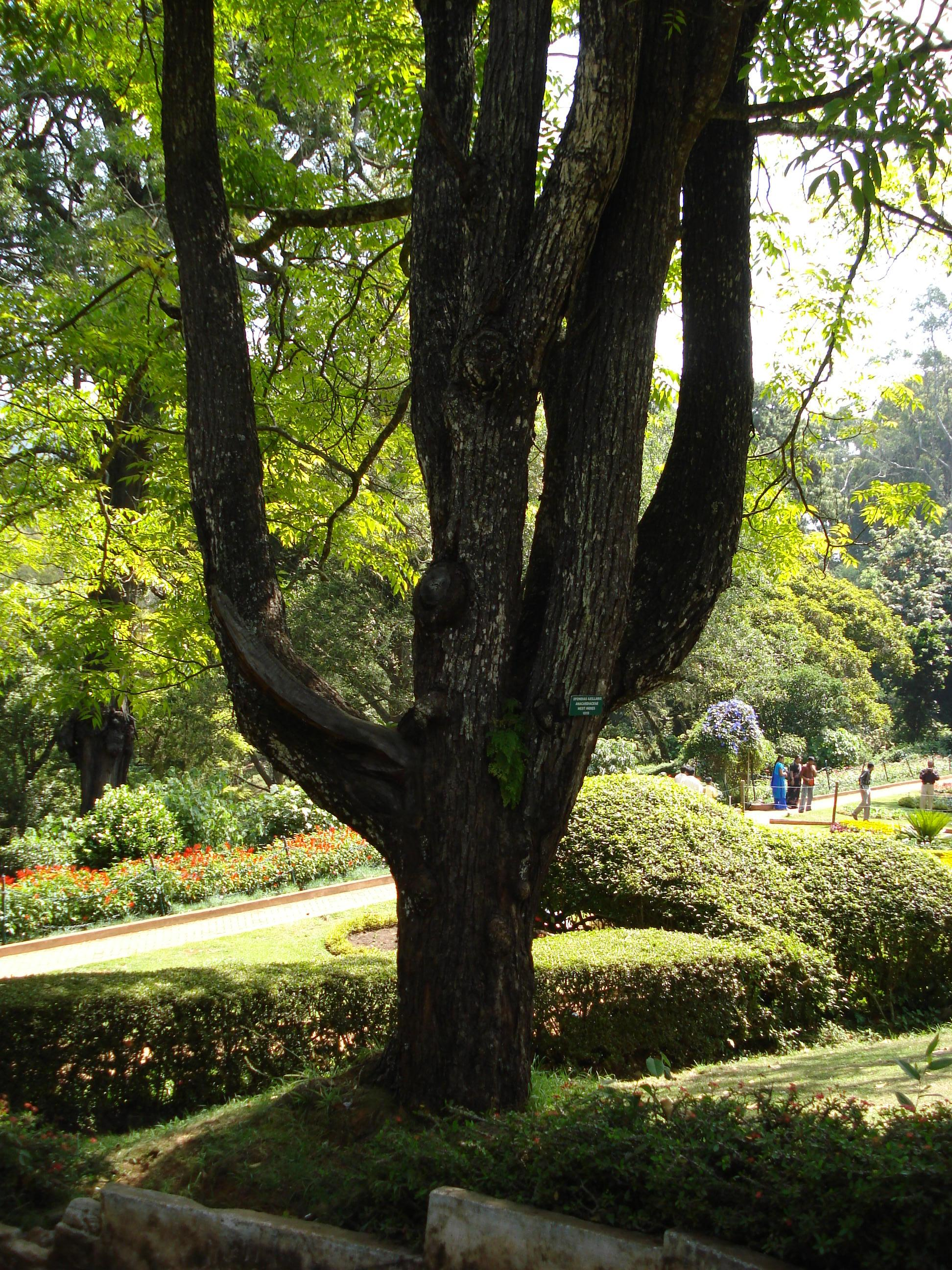

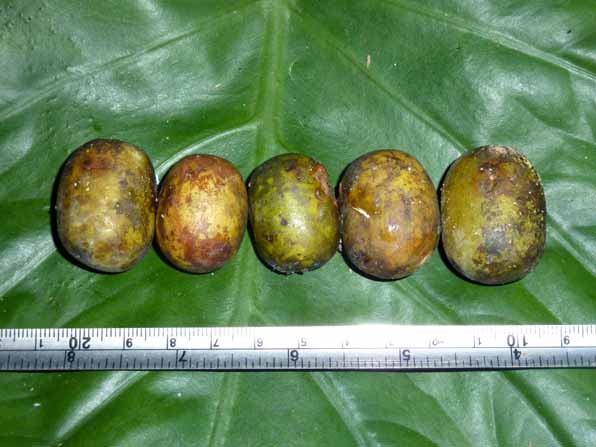

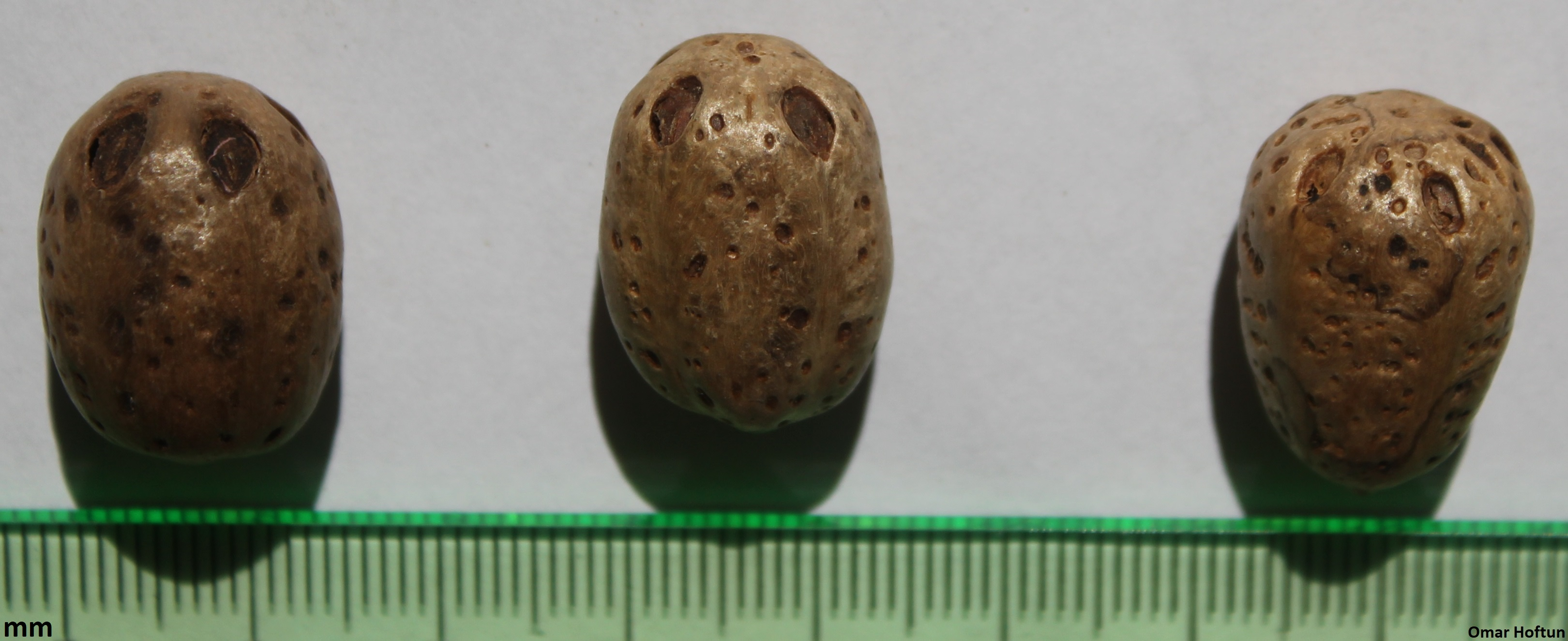
