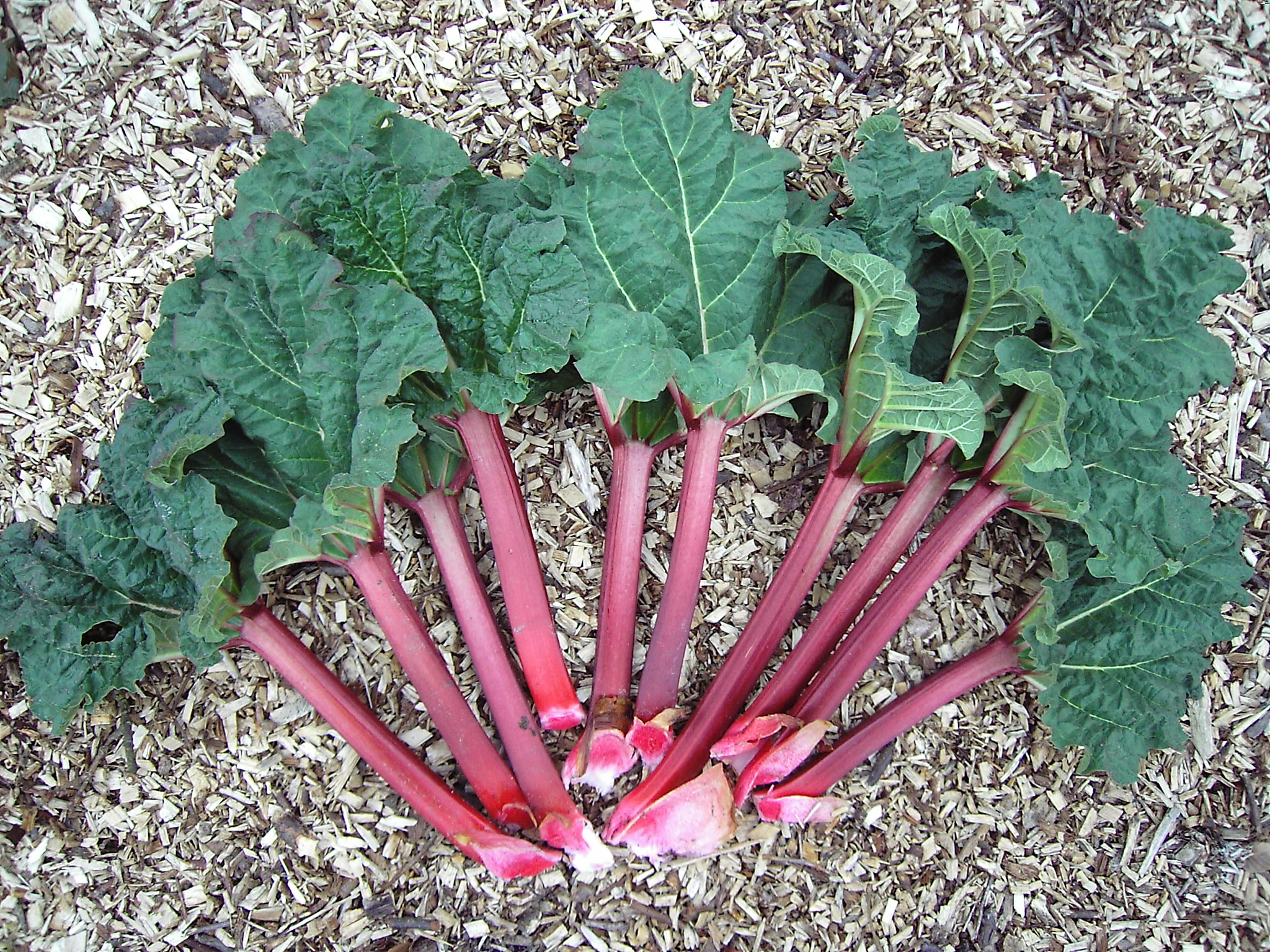

Scientific classification
- Kingdom: Plantae
- Clade: Tracheophytes
- Clade: Angiosperms
- Clade: Eudicots
- Order: Caryophyllales
- Family: Polygonaceae
- Genus: Rheum
- Species: R. × hybridum

Binomial name
- Rheum × hybridum Murray

= Rhubarb =

Rhubarb (culinary hybrid)

Species of herbaceous perennial plant with fleshy, sour edible stalks

Rhubarb is the fleshy, edible stalks (petioles) of species and hybrids (culinary rhubarb) of Rheum in the family Polygonaceae, which are cooked and used for food. The plant is a herbaceous perennial that grows from short, thick rhizomes. Historically, different plants have been called "rhubarb" in English. The large, triangular leaves contain high levels of oxalic acid and anthrone glycosides, making them poisonous and therefore inedible. The small flowers are grouped in large compound leafy greenish-white to rose-red inflorescences.

The precise origin of culinary rhubarb is unknown. The species Rheum rhabarbarum (syn. R. undulatum) and R. rhaponticum were grown in Europe before the 18th century and used in folk medicine. By the early 18th century, these two species and a possible hybrid of unknown origin, R. × hybridum, were grown as vegetable crops in England and Scandinavia. They readily hybridize, and culinary rhubarb was developed by selecting open-pollinated seed, so its precise origin is almost impossible to determine. In appearance, samples of culinary rhubarb vary on a continuum between R. rhaponticum and R. rhabarbarum. However, modern rhubarb cultivars are tetraploids with 2n = 44, in contrast to 2n = 22 for the wild species.

Rhubarb is a vegetable but is often put to the same culinary uses as fruits. The leaf stalks can be used raw while they have a crisp texture, but are most commonly cooked with sugar and used in pies, crumbles, and other desserts. They have a strong, tart taste. Many cultivars have been developed for human consumption, most of which are recognised as Rheum × hybridum by the Royal Horticultural Society.

== Etymology ==
The word rhubarb is likely to have derived in the 14th century from the Old French rubarbe, which came from the Latin rheubarbarum and Greek rha barbaron, meaning "foreign rha". The Greek physician Dioscorides used the Greek word ῥᾶ (rha), whereas Galen later used ῥῆον (rhēon), Latin rheum. These in turn derive from a Persian name for species of Rheum. The specific epithet rhaponticum, applying to one of the presumed parents of the cultivated plant, means "rha from the region of the Black Sea" or the river Volga, rha being its ancient name.

== Cultivation ==
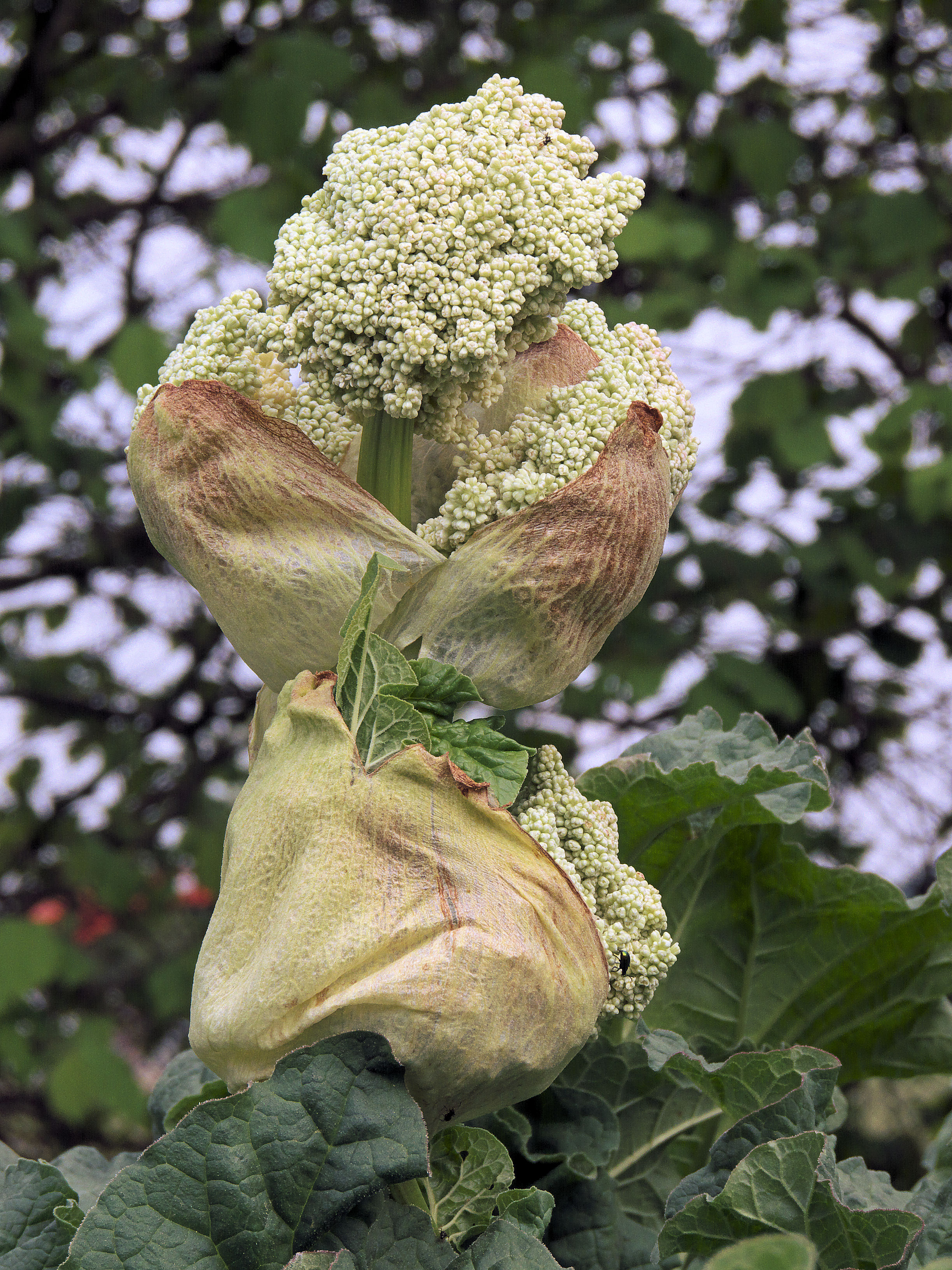
Young rhubarb flowers

Rhubarb is grown widely, and with greenhouse production it is available throughout much of the year. It needs rainfall and an annual cold period of up to 7–9 weeks at 3 °C (37 °F), known as 'cold units', to grow well. The plant develops a substantial underground storage organ (rhubarb crowns) and this can be used for early production by transferring field-grown crowns to warm conditions. Rhubarb grown in hothouses (heated greenhouses) is called "hothouse rhubarb", and is typically made available at consumer markets in early spring, before outdoor cultivated rhubarb is available. Hothouse rhubarb is usually brighter red, tenderer and sweeter-tasting than outdoor rhubarb. After forcing for commercial production, the crowns are usually discarded. In temperate climates, rhubarb is one of the first food plants harvested, usually in mid- to late spring (April or May in the Northern Hemisphere, October or November in the Southern Hemisphere), and the season for field-grown plants lasts until the end of summer.

In the United Kingdom, the first rhubarb of the year is harvested by candlelight in forcing sheds where all other light is excluded, a practice that produces a sweeter, more tender stalk. These sheds are dotted around the "Rhubarb Triangle" in Yorkshire between Wakefield, Leeds, and Morley.

In the United States, rhubarb is primarily produced in the states of Oregon, Washington, and Wisconsin with approximately 1,200 acres in production, of which 175 are covered in hothouses. In the northwestern US states of Oregon and Washington, there are typically two harvests, from late April to May and from late June into July; half of all US commercial production is in Pierce County, Washington. Rhubarb is ready to consume as soon as harvested, and freshly cut stalks are firm and glossy.

Rhubarb damaged by severe cold should not be eaten, as it may be high in oxalic acid, which migrates from the leaves and can cause illness.

The colour of rhubarb stalks can vary from the commonly associated crimson red, through speckled light pink, to simply light green. Rhubarb stalks are poetically described as "crimson stalks". The colour results from the presence of anthocyanins, and varies according to both rhubarb variety and production technique. The colour is not related to its suitability for cooking.

=== Historical cultivation ===
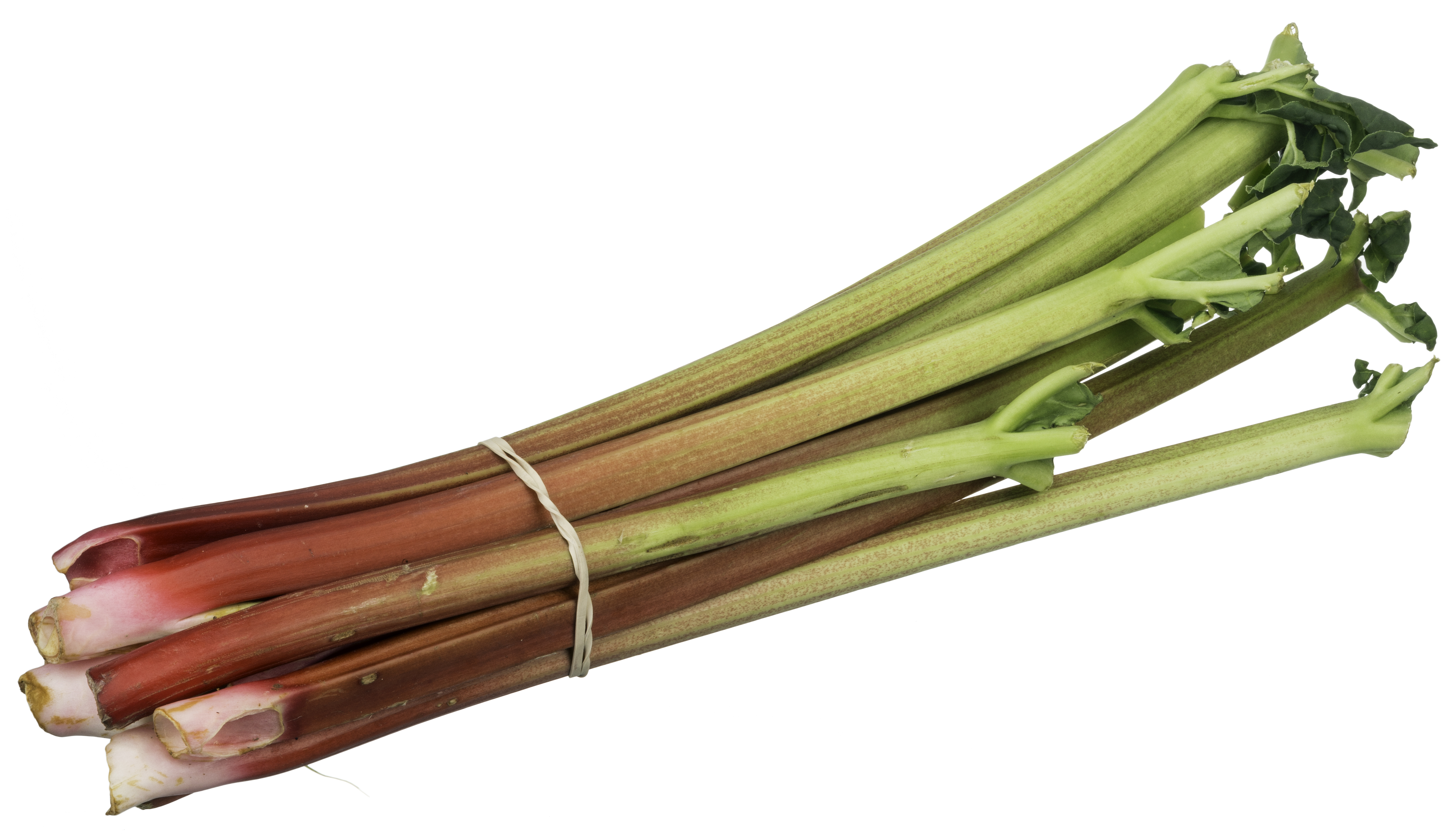
A bundle of rhubarb

The Chinese call rhubarb "the great yellow" (dà huáng 大黃), and have used rhubarb root for medicinal purposes. It appears in The Divine Farmer's Herb-Root Classic, which is thought to have been compiled about 1,800 years ago. Though Dioscurides' description of ρηον or ρά indicates that a medicinal root brought to Greece from beyond the Bosphorus may have been rhubarb, commerce in the plant did not become securely established until Islamic times. During Islamic times, it was imported along the Silk Road, reaching Europe in the 14th century through the ports of Aleppo and Smyrna, where it became known as "Turkish rhubarb". Later, it began to arrive via new maritime routes and overland through Russia. The "Russian rhubarb" was the most valued, probably because of the rhubarb-specific quality control system maintained by the Russian Empire. The 2020 edition of Pharmacopoeia of the People's Republic of China lists the following species as medicinally acceptable: Rheum officinale, Rheum palmatum, and Rheum tanguticum. Grieve describes "Turkish rhubarb" as a mixture of R. palmatum and R. rhaponticum.

The cost of transportation across Asia made rhubarb expensive in medieval Europe. It was several times the price of other valuable herbs and spices such as cinnamon, opium, and saffron. The merchant explorer Marco Polo therefore searched for the place where the plant was grown and harvested, discovering that it was cultivated in the mountains of Tangut province. The value of rhubarb can be seen in Ruy Gonzáles de Clavijo's report of his embassy in 1403–1405 to Timur in Samarkand: "The best of all merchandise coming to Samarkand was from China: especially silks, satins, musk, rubies, diamonds, pearls, and rhubarb...."

The high price, as well as the increasing demand from apothecaries, stimulated efforts to cultivate the different species of rhubarb on European soil. R. rhaponticum × R. officinale came to be grown in England to produce the roots. R. alpinus was also allowed to grow wild. The local availability of the plants grown for medicinal purposes, together with the increasing abundance and decreasing price of sugar in the 18th century, galvanised its culinary adoption. Grieve claims a date of 1820 in England. Rhubarb was harvested in Scotland from at least 1786, having been introduced to the Botanical Garden in Edinburgh by the traveller Bruce of Kinnaird in 1774. He brought the seeds from Abyssinia and they produced 3,000 plants.

Though it is often asserted that rhubarb first came to the United States in the 1820s, John Bartram was growing medicinal and culinary rhubarbs in Philadelphia from the 1730s, planting seeds sent to him by Peter Collinson. From the first, the familiar garden rhubarb was not the only Rheum in American gardens: Thomas Jefferson planted R. undulatum at Monticello in 1809 and 1811, observing that it was "Esculent rhubarb, the leaves excellent as Spinach."

== Cultivars ==
The advocate of organic gardening Lawrence D. Hills listed his favourite rhubarb varieties for flavour as 'Hawke's Champagne', 'Victoria', 'Timperley Early', and 'Early Albert', also recommending 'Gaskin's Perpetual' for having the lowest level of oxalic acid, allowing it to be harvested over a much longer period of the growing season without developing excessive sourness.

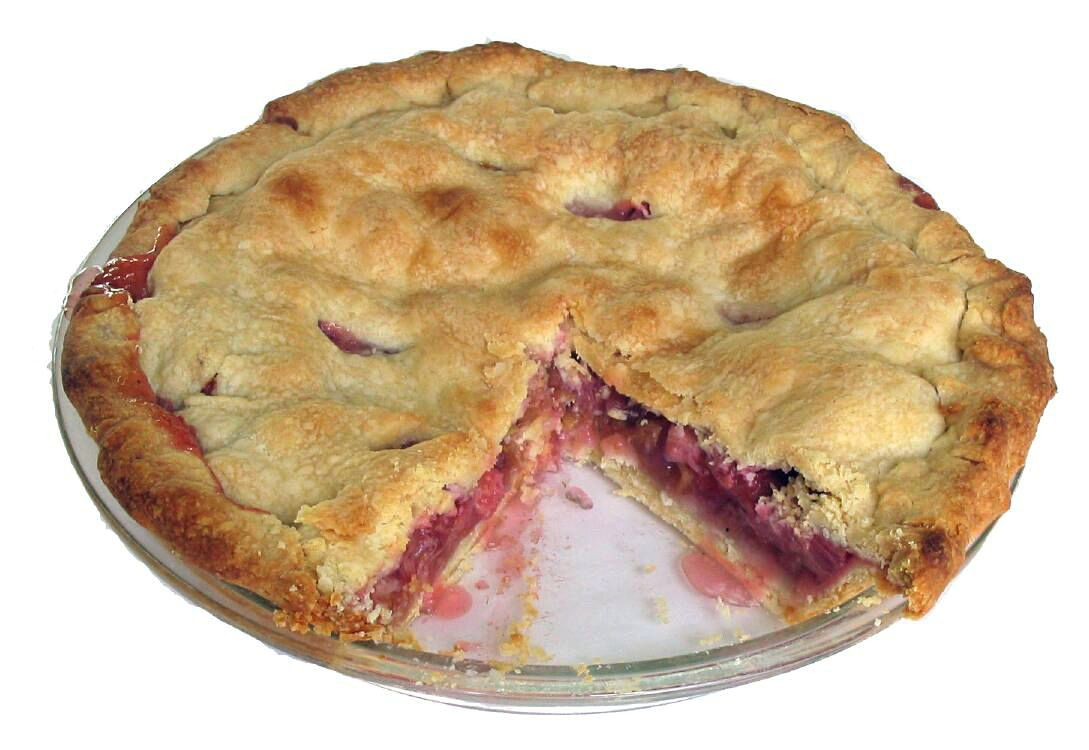
A homemade rhubarb pie

The Royal Horticultural Society has the UK's national collection of rhubarb that comprises 103 varieties. In 2021–2022 this was moved from southern England to the more northern garden RHS Bridgewater where winter cold and rainfall are better suited for rhubarb. The following cultivars have gained the Royal Horticultural Society's Award of Garden Merit:

- 'Grandad's Favourite'
- 'Reed's Early Superb'
- 'Stein's Champagne'
- 'Timperley Early'

== Uses ==
Rhubarb, raw
Nutritional value per 100 g (3.5 oz)
- Energy: 88 kJ (21 kcal)
- Carbohydrates: 4.54 g
- Sugars: 1.1 g
- Dietary fiber: 1.8 g
- Fat: 0.3 g
- Protein: 0.8 g
Vitamins and minerals
Vitamins	Quantity %DV^{†}
Thiamine (B1)	2% 0.02 mg
Riboflavin (B2)	2% 0.03 mg
Niacin (B3)	2% 0.3 mg
Pantothenic acid (B5)	2% 0.085 mg
Vitamin B6	1% 0.024 mg
Folate (B9)	2% 7 μg
Choline	1% 6.1 mg
Vitamin C	9% 8 mg
Vitamin E	2% 0.27 mg
Vitamin K	24% 29.3 μg
Minerals	Quantity %DV^{†}
Calcium	7% 86 mg
Copper	2% 0.021 mg
Iron	1% 0.22 mg
Magnesium	3% 12 mg
Manganese	9% 0.196 mg
Phosphorus	1% 14 mg
Potassium	10% 288 mg
Selenium	2% 1.1 μg
Sodium	0% 4 mg
Zinc	1% 0.1 mg
- Other constituents: Quantity
- Water: 94 g
- Link to USDA Database entry
- ^{†}Percentages estimated using US recommendations for adults, except for potassium, which is estimated based on expert recommendation from the National Academies.

Rhubarb is grown primarily for its sour, fleshy leafstalks, technically known as petioles. The use of rhubarb stalks as food is a relatively recent innovation. This usage was first recorded in 18th- to 19th-century England after affordable sugar became more widely available.

Commonly, it is stewed with sugar or used in pies and desserts, but it can also be put into savoury dishes or pickled. Rhubarb can be dehydrated and infused with fruit juice. In the United States, it is usually infused with strawberry juice to mimic the popular strawberry rhubarb pie.

=== Food ===
The species Rheum ribes has been eaten in the Islamic world since the 10th century.

In Northern Europe and North America, the stalks are commonly cut into pieces and stewed with added sugar until soft. The resulting compote, sometimes thickened with corn starch, can then be used in pies, tarts and crumbles. Alternatively, greater quantities of sugar can be added with pectin to make jams. A paired spice used is ginger, although cinnamon and nutmeg are also common additions.

In the United Kingdom, as well as being used in the typical pies, tarts and crumbles, rhubarb compote is also combined with whipped cream or custard to make rhubarb fool. In the United States, the common usage of rhubarb in pies has led to it being nicknamed "pie plant", by which it is referred to in 19th-century cookbooks. Rhubarb in the US is also often paired with strawberries to make strawberry-rhubarb pie, though some rhubarb purists jokingly consider this "a rather unhappy marriage".

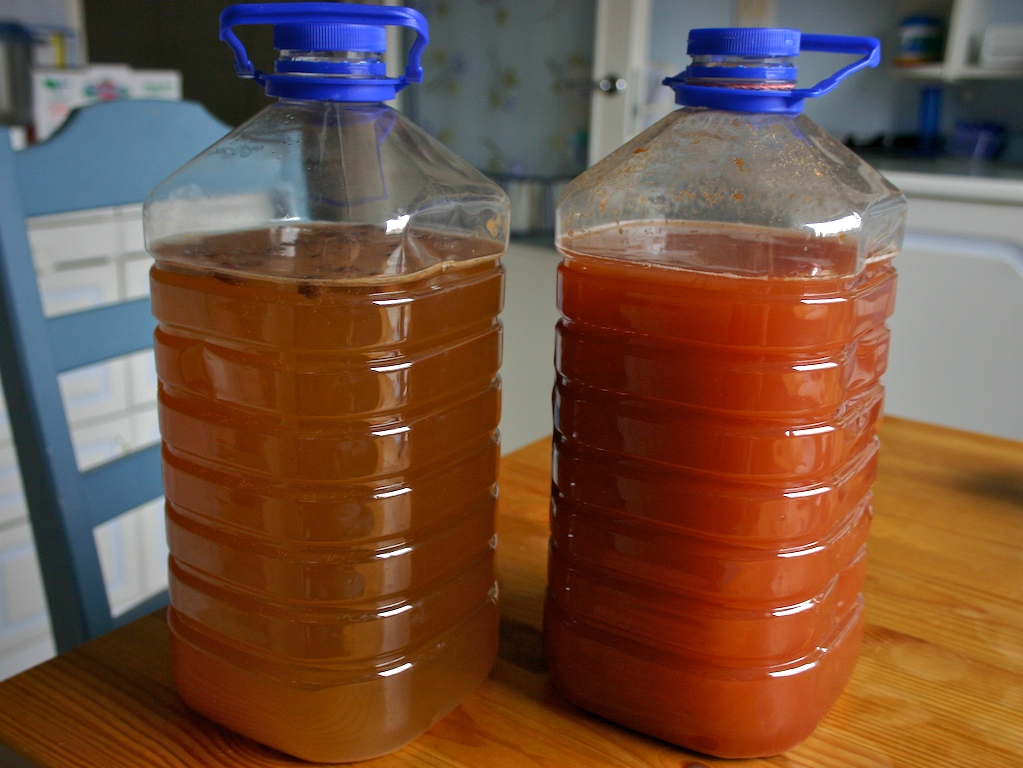
Two varieties of sima: original (left) and rhubarb (right)

Rhubarb can also be used to make alcoholic drinks, such as fruit wines or Finnish rhubarb sima. It is also used to make Kompot.

=== Nutrition ===
Raw rhubarb is 94% water, 5% carbohydrates, 1% protein, and contains negligible fat (table). In a 100-gram (3 1/2-ounce) reference amount, raw rhubarb supplies 88 kilojoules (21 kilocalories) of food energy, and is a rich source of vitamin K (24% of the Daily Value, DV) and a moderate source of potassium (10% DV), with no other micronutrients in significant amounts (table).

=== Traditional Chinese medicine ===
In traditional Chinese medicine, rhubarb roots of several species were used as a laxative for several millennia, although there is no clinical evidence to indicate such use is effective.

== Phytochemistry and potential toxicity ==
The roots and stems contain anthraquinones, such as emodin and rhein. Emodin "represents a genotoxic risk for humans" while rhein is "a compound devoid of genotoxic capabilities". The anthraquinones have been separated from powdered rhubarb root for purposes in traditional medicine, although long-term consumption of anthraquinones has been associated with acute kidney failure.

The rhizomes contain stilbenoid compounds (including rhaponticin), and the flavanol glucosides (+)-catechin-5-O-glucoside and (−)-catechin-7-O-glucoside.

=== Oxalic acid ===
Rhubarb leaves contain poisonous substances, including oxalic acid, a nephrotoxin. The long term consumption of oxalic acid leads to kidney stone formation in humans. Humans have been poisoned after ingesting the leaves, a particular problem during World War I when the leaves were mistakenly recommended as a food source in Britain. The printed information recommending the leaves as a food source was rediscovered during World War 2 and redistributed, leading to further deaths. This phenomenon occurred due to long term and high quantity exposure to rhubarb leaves. Contrary to popular belief, rhubarb leaves do not cause severe symptoms or death in low amounts. Rhubarb leaves have been used in flavouring extracts, after the oxalic acid is removed by treatment with precipitated chalk (i.e., calcium carbonate).

The LD_{50} (median lethal dose) for pure oxalic acid in rats is about 375 mg/kg body weight, or about 25 grams for a 65-kilogram (143 lb) human. Other sources give a much higher oral LD_{Lo} (lowest published lethal dose) of 600 mg/kg. While the oxalic acid content of rhubarb leaves can vary, a typical value is about 0.5%, meaning a 65 kg adult would need to eat 4 to 8 kg (9 to 18 lbs) to obtain a lethal dose, depending on which lethal dose is assumed. Cooking the leaves with baking soda can make them more poisonous by producing soluble oxalates. The leaves are believed to also contain an additional, unidentified toxin, which might be an anthraquinone glycoside (also known as senna glycosides).

In the petioles (leaf stalks), the proportion of oxalic acid is about 10% of the total 2–2.5% acidity, which derives mainly from malic acid. Serious cases of rhubarb poisoning are not well documented. Both fatal and non-fatal cases of rhubarb poisoning may be caused not by oxalates, but rather by toxic anthraquinone glycosides.

== Pests ==
Rhubarb is a host to the rhubarb curculio, Lixus concavus, which is a weevil. Damage is mainly visible on leaves and stalks, with gummosis and oval or circular feeding and egg-laying sites.

Hungry wildlife may dig up and eat rhubarb roots in the spring, as stored starches are turned to sugars for new foliage growth.

== Cookbook ==
- Rhubarb Cake at the Wikibooks Cookbook subproject
- Rhubarb Crumble at the Wikibooks Cookbook subproject
- Rhubarb Fool at the Wikibooks Cookbook subproject
- Rhubarb Juice at the Wikibooks Cookbook subproject
- Rhubarb Marmalade at the Wikibooks Cookbook subproject
- Rhubarb Pie at the Wikibooks Cookbook subproject
- Rhubarb Pudding at the Wikibooks Cookbook subproject
- Strawberry Rhubarb Pie at the Wikibooks Cookbook subproject

== Gallery ==
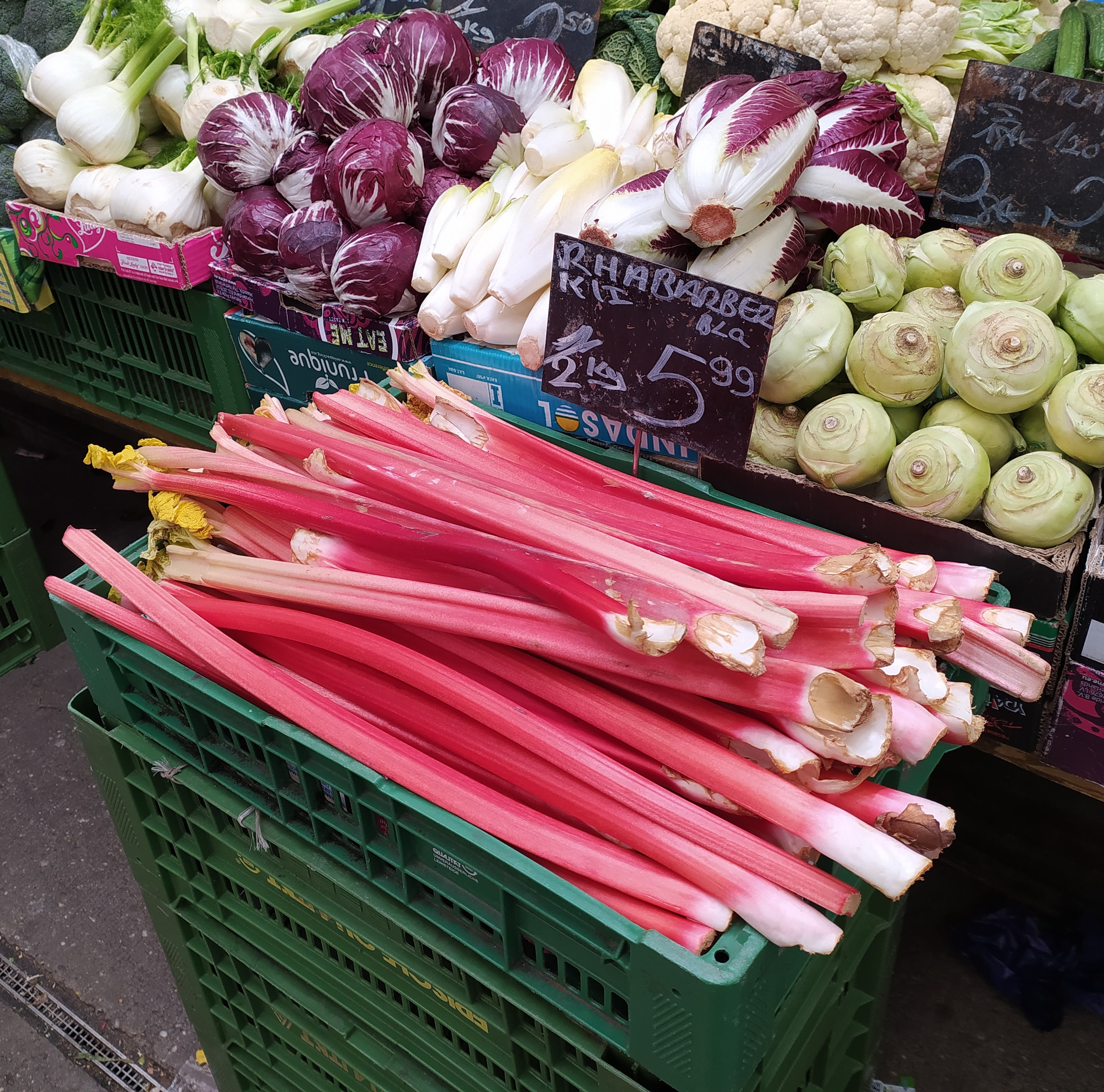
Rhubarb displayed for sale at a market

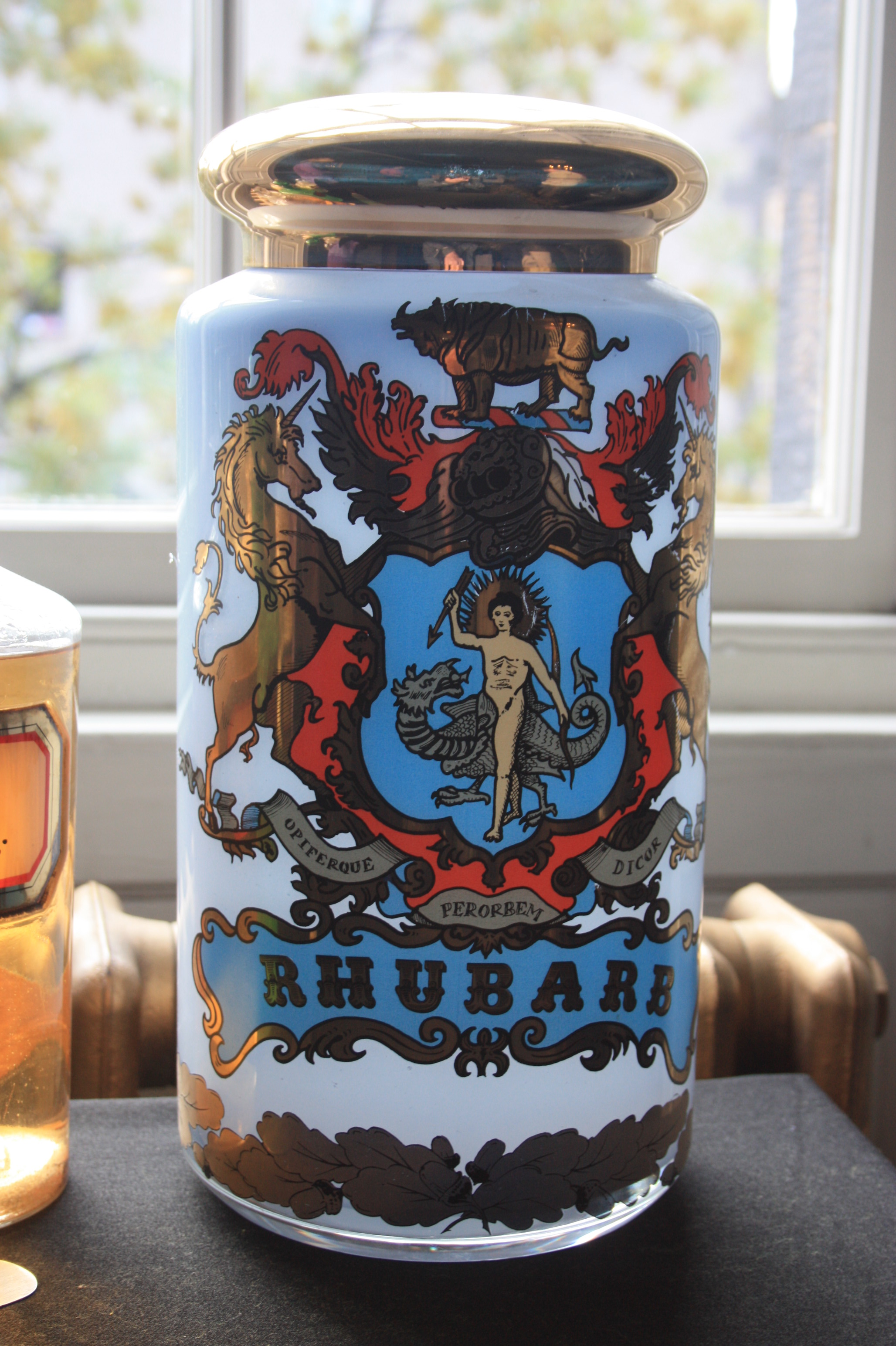
A 19th-century apothecary jar for rhubarb

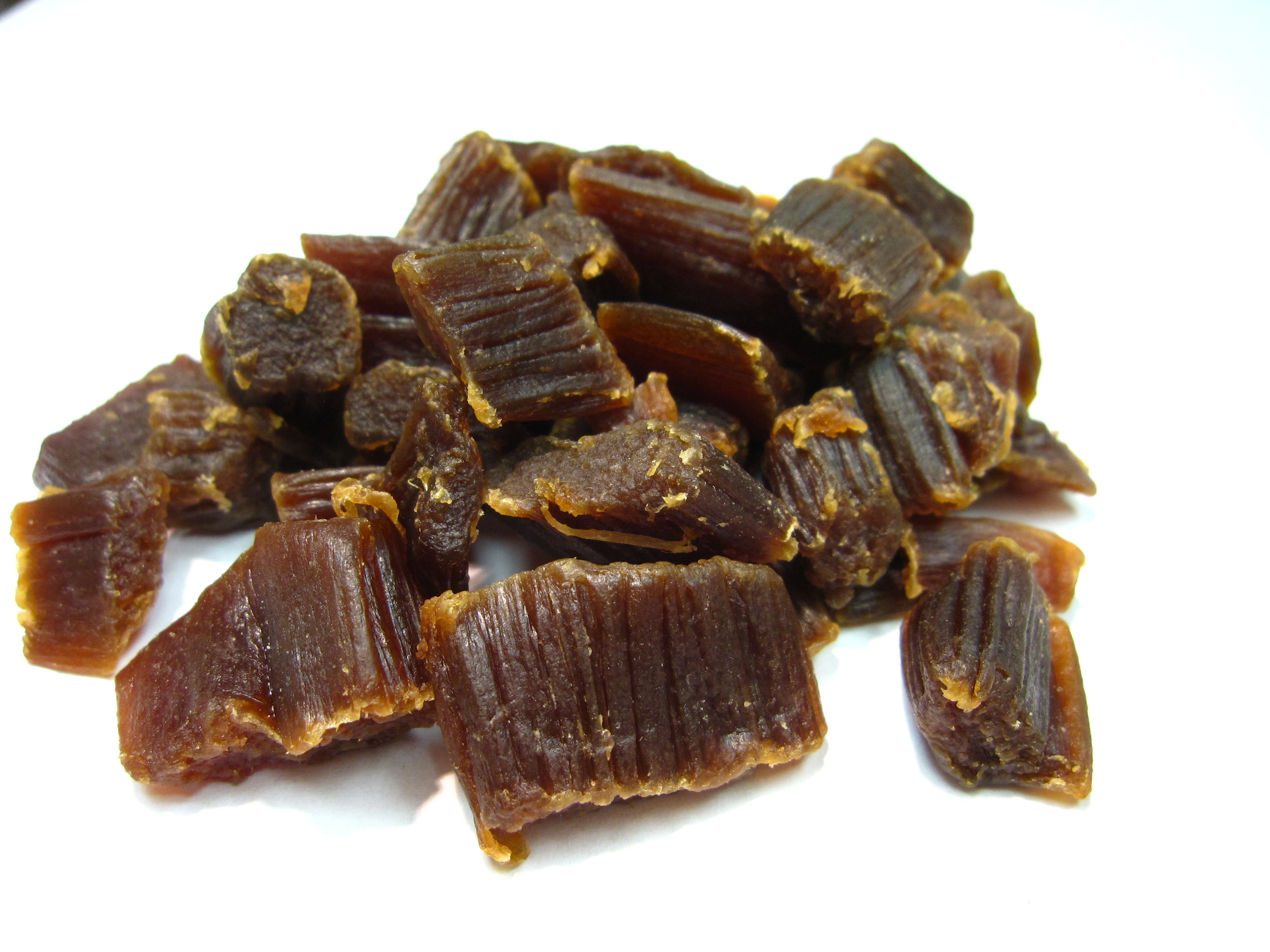
Dried strawberry-flavoured rhubarb

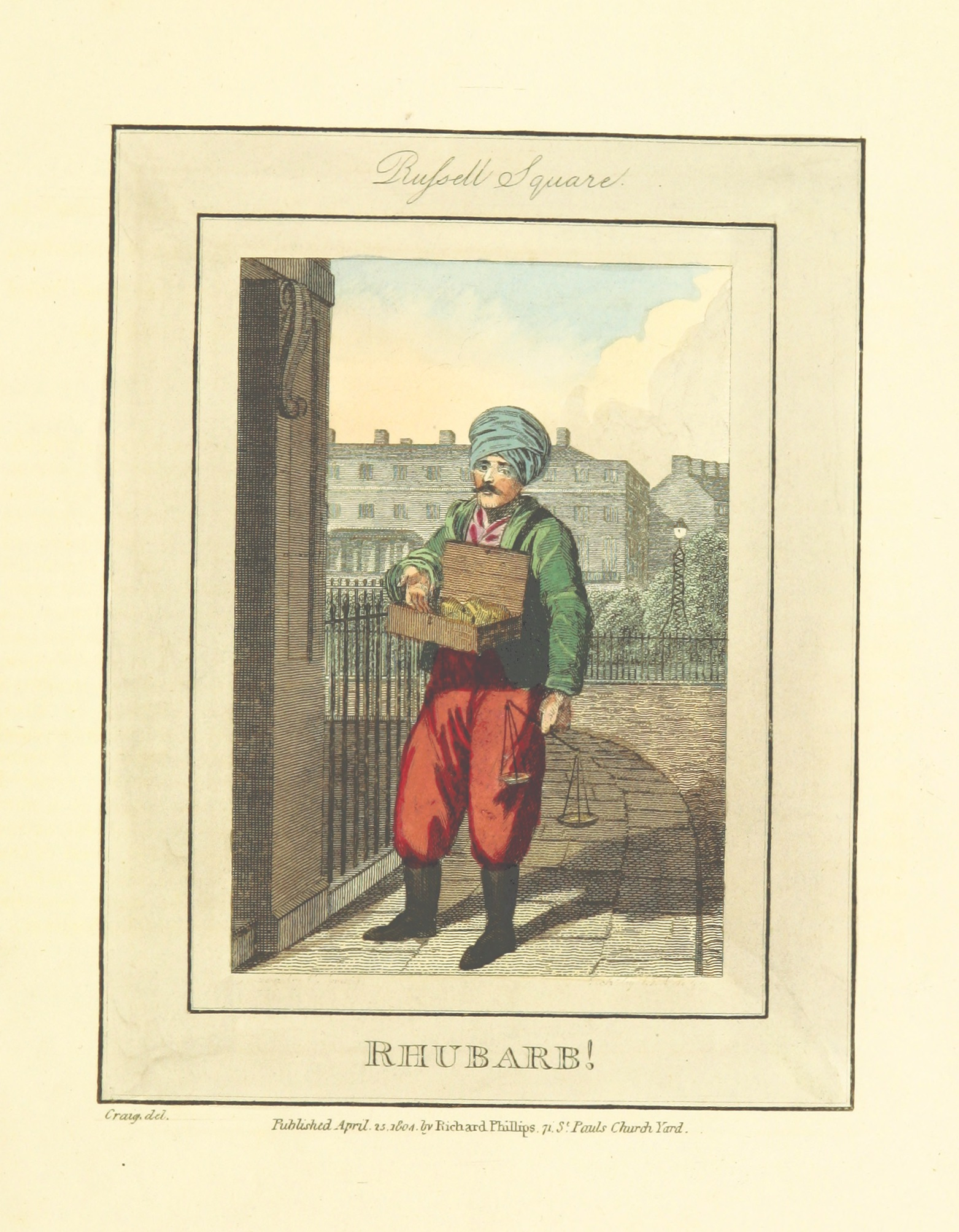
1804 illustration of a rhubarb seller in London

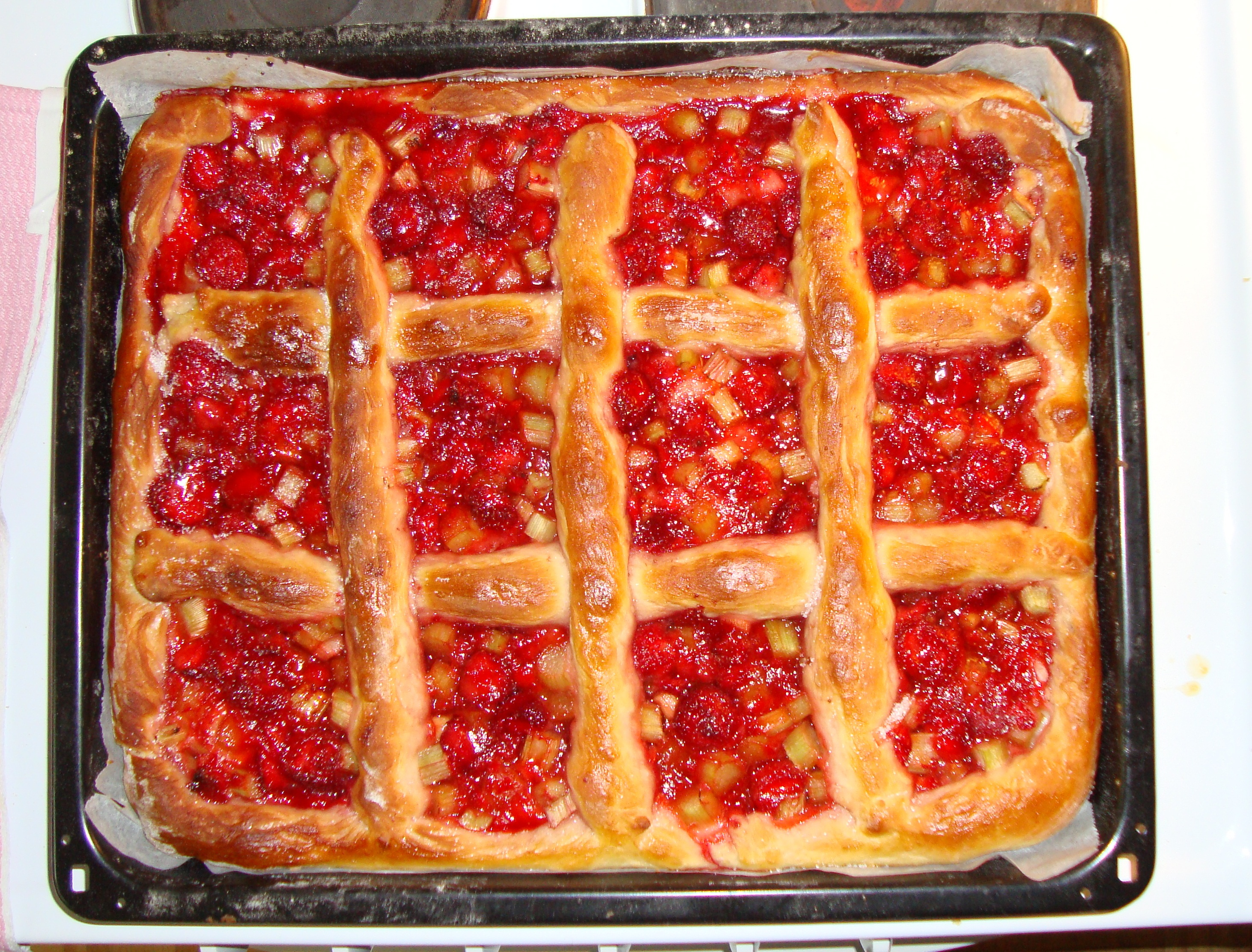
Old-fashioned strawberry-rhubarb pie
