= Rhubarb forcer =

Agricultural tool

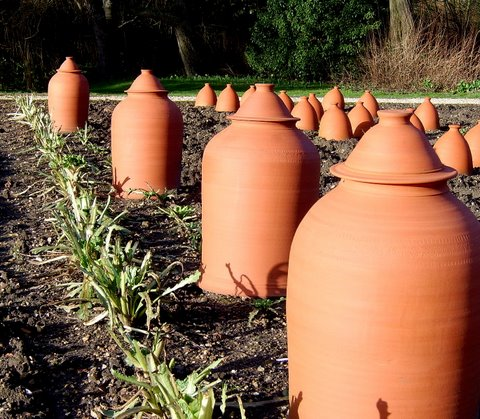
Rhubarb forcers in a restaurant vegetable garden

A rhubarb forcer is a bell-shaped pot with a lidded opening at the top, used to cover rhubarb to limit photosynthesis. It encourages the plant to grow early in the season and to produce blanched stems that are sweeter and more tender than usual.

== Use ==
A rhubarb forcer is traditionally made of terracotta, but it can be as simple as an upside-down plastic bucket. It is around 18 inches (46 cm) high and 14 inches (36 cm) wide without the lid.

It is placed over a two- to three-year-old rhubarb crown during winter or early spring. Once a shoot appears, the lid is taken off, causing the plant to grow towards the light.

== History ==
The use of rhubarb forcers dates back to the early 1800s, when the forcing technique was developed in the United Kingdom. The Chelsea Physic Garden takes credit for the discovery, claiming that one of their gardeners found some rhubarb growing underneath a bucket and realized the potential of the technique.

Eventually, rhubarb forcing was implemented in an area of West Yorkshire known as the Rhubarb Triangle. Today, farmers there use sheds, rather than individual pots, to block the sunlight from their rhubarb plants.
