= Rhubarb Triangle =

Rhubarb-producing area in England

Coordinates: 53°44′N 1°30′W

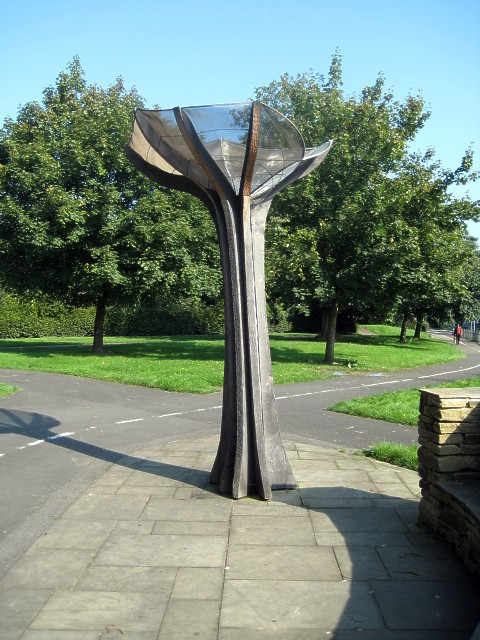
Rhubarb sculpture in Wakefield

The Rhubarb Triangle is a 9-square-mile (23 km^{2}) area of West Yorkshire, England famous for producing early forced rhubarb. It is delineated by Wakefield, Morley, and Rothwell, and it includes the villages of Carlton, East Ardsley, Kirkhamgate, Lofthouse, and Stanley. In 2010, Yorkshire Forced Rhubarb was awarded Protected Designation of Origin (PDO) status by the European Commission's Protected Food Name scheme.

== Background ==
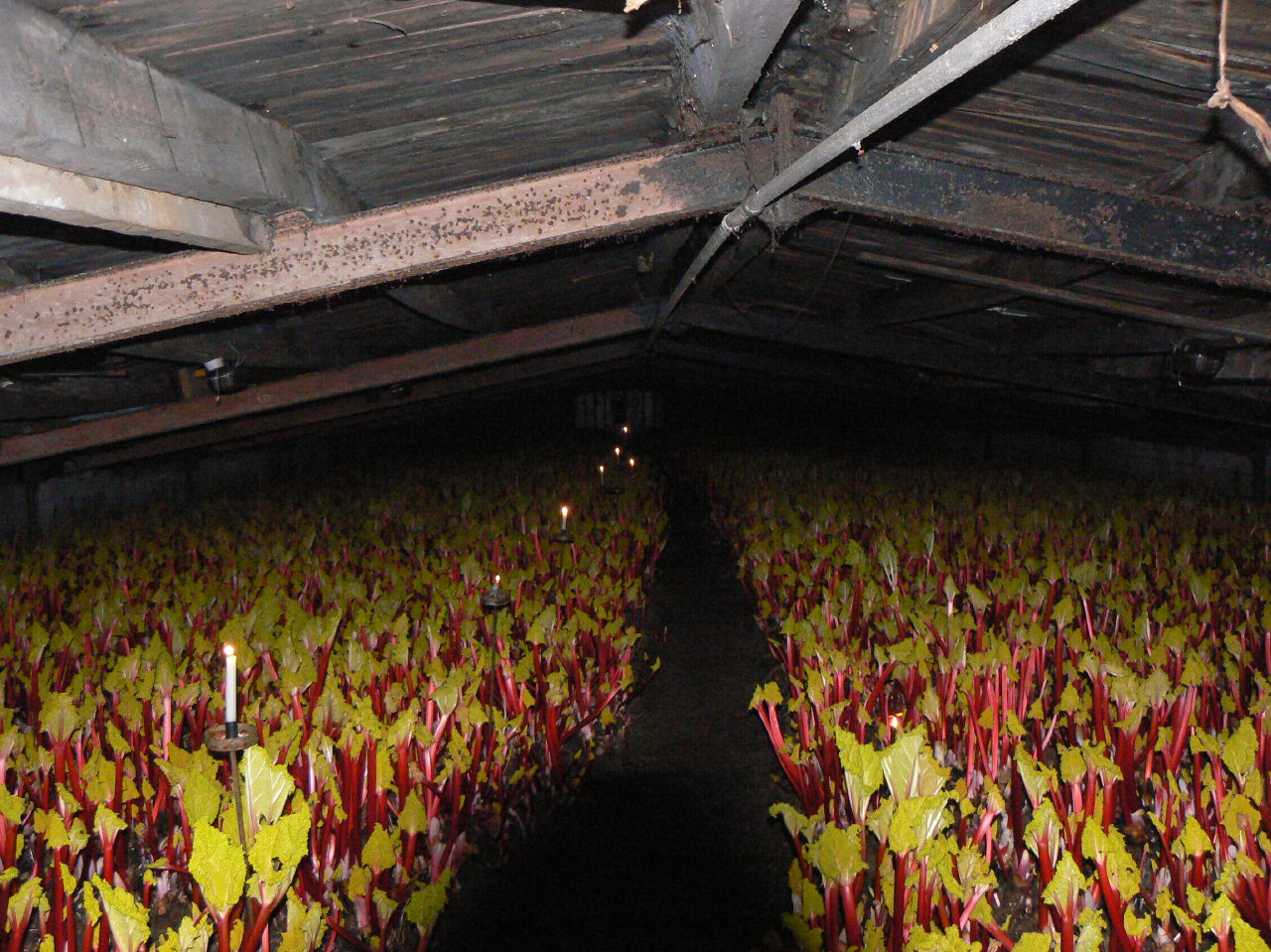
Inside a rhubarb shed in the Rhubarb Triangle

Rhubarb (Rheum × hybridum) is a plant native to Siberia. Its name derives from the Latin expression Rheum barbarum, the barbarian from the banks of the River Rha (Volga). Rhubarb thrives in the wet cold winters and long hot summers in Yorkshire.

In the practice of rhubarb forcing, plants spend two years in the fields without being harvested. The plants store energy from the sun in their roots as carbohydrates. In November, the roots are subjected to frost and then moved into sheds, where they are kept in complete darkness. The sheds are long low buildings which are heated, originally with coal, which was plentiful and relatively cheap in the area, but more recently by diesel. In the sheds, the plants begin to grow in the warmth, and the stored carbohydrate in the roots is transformed into glucose. The rhubarb is harvested near the end of winter. Traditionally, pickers pull the stalks in candlelight, as any exposure to strong light stops the growth. By the end of March, the harvest is complete. The root stock is totally exhausted and used for compost.

Its glucose gives the forced rhubarb a sour-sweet flavour. Forced rhubarb grown in the sheds is more tender than that grown outdoors in summer. Without daylight, the rhubarb leaves are a green-yellow colour, and the stalks, measuring around 2 feet (61 cm), are crimson in colour with a smooth texture.

== History ==
The cultivation method for forced rhubarb was developed in the early 1800s. Growing and forcing rhubarb was originally done by many hundreds of small farmers, smallholders and market gardeners. The fields were fertilised with large quantities of horse manure and 'night soil' from the nearby urban areas and woollen waste from "mungo and shoddy" mills. In later years, some growers expanded, eventually owning many thousands of roots and extensive forcing sheds.

In the late 19th century, early forced rhubarb was sent to Spitalfields and Covent Garden markets in London in time for Christmas, and to Paris for the French market. A special express train carrying rhubarb was run by the Great Northern Railway Company from Ardsley station every weekday night during the forced rhubarb season from Christmas until Easter. Up to 200 tons of rhubarb sent by up to 200 growers was carried daily at the peak of production before 1939.

At one time, West Yorkshire produced 90% of the world's winter forced rhubarb. The rhubarb-growing region measured about 30 square miles (78 km^{2}) between Leeds, Bradford and Wakefield.

Rhubarb became less popular after the Second World War, when more exotic fruits became more available. In 1962, a rail strike caused the rhubarb growers to look for alternative transport, and the rhubarb express service ended shortly after.

The Oxford English Dictionary dates the name "rhubarb triangle" to a 1965 textbook. The name was also mentioned in the Guardian newspaper in 1986.

== EU recognition ==
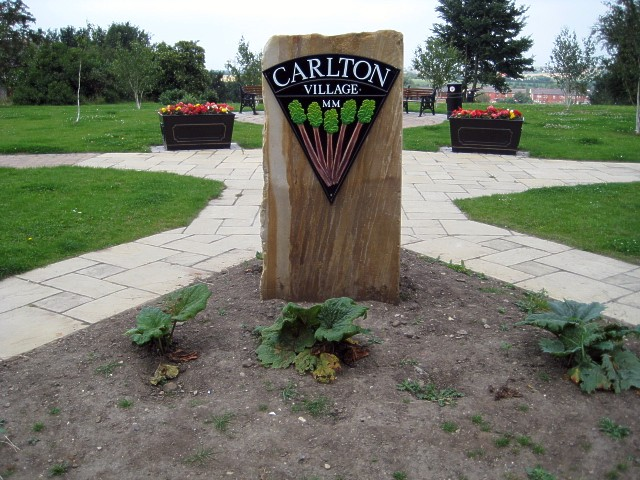
Carlton village sign celebrates its link with rhubarb

The European Commission's Protected Food Name scheme promotes regional traditional specialties such as Stilton cheese, champagne and Parma ham. It provides legal backing against products made outside the designated regions using the same names.

Twelve farmers who farm within the Rhubarb Triangle applied to have the name "Yorkshire forced rhubarb" legally protected by this scheme. Their campaign was aided by the Department for Environment, Food and Rural Affairs (Defra) and Leeds Central MP Hilary Benn. In 2010, Yorkshire Forced Rhubarb was awarded Protected Designation of Origin (PDO) status.

The Rhubarb Triangle's geographical area in EU law is "from Ackworth Moor Top north along the A628 to Featherstone and Pontefract. Then on to the A656 through Castleford. It then goes west along the A63 past Garforth and West Garforth. Head north passing Whitkirk, Manston and on towards the A6120 by Scholes. Follow the A6120 west, round to pass Farsley which then leads south west via the A647 onto the A6177. Pass Dudley Hill to pick up the M606 south. At junction 26 take the M62 south to junction 25 head east along A644 toward Dewsbury, passing Mirfield, to pick up the A638 towards Wakefield. At Wakefield take the A638 south to Ackworth Moor top."

== Legacy ==
Wakefield Council holds an annual Rhubarb Festival in February, celebrating the area's links and promoting the surviving rhubarb industry. A Farmers' Market, cookery demonstrations, walks and tours of the forcing sheds are among the attractions.

Rhubarb growing and the rhubarb trains are featured in Wakefield Museum. In 2005, Wakefield council erected a sculpture depicting a rhubarb plant in Holmfield Park Wakefield. In 2016, the Hepworth Wakefield exhibited photographs by Martin Parr, including a series about the Rhubarb Triangle.

In Frances Brody's 2019 novel The Body on the Train (Piatkus: ISBN 978-0-349-42306-7), a murdered man's body is found on a rhubarb train from Ardsley, on its arrival at King's Cross. The book's cover illustration features boxes of rhubarb on a platform beside a train.

== See also ==
- Rhubarb forcer
