= Catechin-7-O-glucoside =

Names
- IUPAC name (2S,4S,5S)-2-[[(2R,3S)-2-(3,4-Dihydroxyphenyl)-3,5-dihydroxy-3,4-dihydro-2H-chromen-7-yl]oxy]-6-(hydroxymethyl)oxane-3,4,5-triol
- Other names (2R,3S)-Catechin-7-O-β-D-glucopyranoside; Catechin 7-O-β-glucopyranoside (+)-Catechin 7-O-β-glucoside (+)-Catechin 7-O-beta-D-glucopyranoside; Catechin 7-glucoside C7G; CA-G

Identifiers
CAS Number	65597-47-9
3D model (JSmol)	Interactive image
ChemSpider	8965102
PubChem CID	10789789
- InChI: InChI=1S/C21H24O11/c22-7-16-17(27)18(28)19(29)21(32-16)30-9-4-12(24)10-6-14(26)20(31-15(10)5-9)8-1-2-11(23)13(25)3-8/h1-5,14,16-29H,6-7H2/t14-,16+,17+,18-,19+,20+,21+/m0/s1 Key: VLFIBROLAXKPQK-DPRDWZRASA-N; InChI=1/C21H24O11/c22-7-16-17(27)18(28)19(29)21(32-16)30-9-4-12(24)10-6-14(26)20(31-15(10)5-9)8-1-2-11(23)13(25)3-8/h1-5,14,16-29H,6-7H2/t14-,16+,17+,18-,19+,20+,21+/m0/s1 Key: VLFIBROLAXKPQK-DPRDWZRABG
- SMILES: O(c2cc3O[C@H](c1ccc(O)c(O)c1)[C@@H](O)Cc3c(O)c2)[C@@H]4O[C@@H]([C@@H](O)[C@H](O)[C@H]4O)CO

Properties
Chemical formula	C_{21}H_{24}O_{11}
Molar mass	452.412 g·mol^{−1}
- Except where otherwise noted, data are given for materials in their standard state (at 25 °C [77 °F], 100 kPa). Infobox references

Catechin-7-O-glucoside is a flavan-3-ol glycoside formed from catechin.

== Natural occurrences ==
Catechin-7-O-glucoside can be isolated from the hemolymph of the European pine sawfly (Neodiprion sertifer). It also occurs in relatively large quantities in cowpea (Vigna unguiculata) as the dominant flavan-3-ol monomer, and actually accounts for up to 70% of cowpea proanthocyanidins (tannins).

It can also be produced by biotransformation of (+)-catechin by cultured cells of Eucalyptus perriniana.

=== Presence in natural traditional drugs ===
Catechin-7-O-glucoside can be found in paeoniae radix, the crude drug made from the roots of Chinese peony (Paeonia lactiflora), in red knotweed (Bistorta macrophylla, also known as Polygonum macrophyllum), in the stem barks of the Nepali hog plum (Choerospondias axillaris), in the Korean plum yew (Cephalotaxus koreana) and in Huanarpo Macho (Jatropha macrantha). (−)-Catechin 7-O-β-D-glucopyranoside is found in the bark of Rhaphiolepis umbellata.

=== Presence in food ===
It is found in buckwheat groats, in the red bean (the seed of Vigna umbellata, formerly known as Phaseolus calcaratus), in barley (Hordeum vulgare L.) and malt. (−)-Catechin 7-O-β-D-glucopyranoside is found in rhubarb.

== Health effects ==
This compound has an antioxidant activity leading to a cytoprotective effect.
