= Catechin-5-O-glucoside =

Names
- IUPAC name (2S,3R,4S,5S,6R)-2-{[(2R,3S)-2-(3,4-Dihydroxyphenyl)-3,7-dihydroxydihydro-2H-1-benzopyran-5-yl]oxy}-6-(hydroxymethyl)oxane-3,4,5-triol
- Other names Catechin 5-O-beta-D-glucopyranoside; C5G

Identifiers
| 3D model (JSmol) | Interactive image |
| ChemSpider | 8519294 |
| PubChem CID | 44257081 |
- InChI: InChI=1S/C21H24O11/c22-7-16-17(27)18(28)19(29)21(32-16)31-15-5-9(23)4-14-10(15)6-13(26)20(30-14)8-1-2-11(24)12(25)3-8/h1-5,13,16-29H,6-7H2/t13-,16-,17-,18+,19-,20-,21-/m1/s1 Key: ZESJTWVSXGZYTD-NJOLZHPTSA-N
- SMILES: OC[C@H]1O[C@@H](OC2=C3C[C@H](O)[C@H](OC3=CC(O)=C2)C2=CC=C(O)C(O)=C2)[C@H](O)[C@@H](O)[C@@H]1O

Properties
| Chemical formula | C_{21}H_{24}O_{11} |
| Molar mass | 452.412 g·mol^{−1} |
- Except where otherwise noted, data are given for materials in their standard state (at 25 °C [77 °F], 100 kPa). Infobox references

Catechin 5-O-glucoside is a flavanol glucoside. It can be found in rhubarb and in the bark of Rhaphiolepis umbellata. It can also be formed from (+)-catechin by plant-cultured cells of Eucalyptus perriniana.
