= Anthraquinones =

Type of compounds

For the parent molecule 9,10-anthraquinone, see anthraquinone

Structure proposed for the pigment carmine.

Anthraquinones (also known as anthraquinonoids) are a class of naturally occurring phenolic compounds based on the 9,10-anthraquinone skeleton. They are widely used industrially and occur naturally.

== History and early preparations ==
Alizarin

The name "anthraquinone" was first used by German chemists Carl Graebe and Carl Theodore Liebermann in a 1868 publication describing the chemical synthesis of the red dye alizarin from anthracene, which is a component of coal tar. This discovery led to the industrial production of alizarin and the impetus for further research on anthraquinone chemistry. Many anthraquinones are prepared by the diacylation of arenes with phthalic anhydride. For example, 2-chloroanthraquinone is prepared in this way from chlorobenzene.

== Occurrence in plants ==
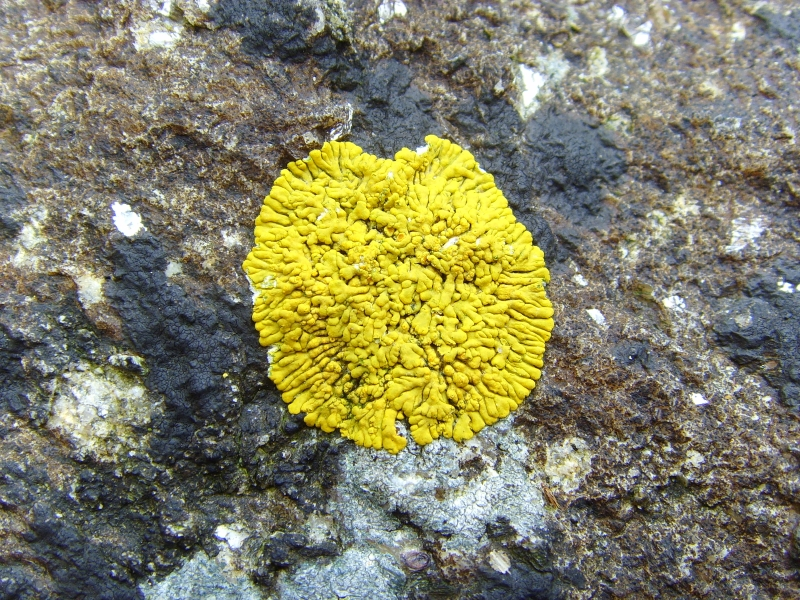
The yellow color of certain lichens, particularly in the family Teloschistaceae (here Variospora thallincola), is due to the presence of anthraquinones.

Natural pigments that are derivatives of anthraquinone are found, inter alia, in aloe latex, senna, rhubarb, and cascara buckthorn, fungi, lichens, and some insects. A type II polyketide synthase is responsible for anthraquinone biosynthesis in the bacterium Photorhabdus luminescens. Chorismate, formed by isochorismate synthase in the shikimate pathway, is a precursor of anthraquinones in Morinda citrifolia. Tests for anthraquinones in natural extracts have been established.

- Senna glycosides from the senna.
- Frangulin in Frangula alnus.
- Aloe-emodin in aloe resin.
- Carmine, a bright-red pigment derived from insects.
- Hypericin and fagopyrin are naphthodianthrones, anthraquinone-derivatives.

== Applications ==
=== Digester additive in papermaking ===
9,10-Anthraquinone is used as a digester additive in production of paper pulp by alkaline processes, like the kraft, the alkaline sulfite or the Soda-AQ processes. The anthraquinone is a redox catalyst. The reaction mechanism may involve single electron transfer (SET). The anthraquinone oxidizes the reducing end of polysaccharides in the pulp, i.e., cellulose and hemicellulose, and thereby protecting it from alkaline degradation (peeling). The anthraquinone is reduced to 9,10-dihydroxyanthracene which then can react with lignin. The lignin is degraded and becomes more watersoluble and thereby more easy to wash away from the pulp, while the anthraquinone is regenerated. This process gives an increase in yield of pulp, typically 1–3% and a reduction in kappa number.

=== In the production of hydrogen peroxide ===
A large industrial application of anthraquinones is for the production of hydrogen peroxide. 2-Ethyl-9,10-anthraquinone or a related alkyl derivative is used, rather than anthraquinone itself.

Catalytic cycle for the anthraquinone process to produce hydrogen peroxide.

Millions of tons of hydrogen peroxide are manufactured by the anthraquinone process.

=== Pulping ===
Sodium 2-anthraquinonesulfonate (AMS) is a water-soluble anthraquinone derivative that was the first anthraquinone derivative discovered to have a catalytic effect in the alkaline pulping processes.

=== Dyestuff precursor ===
The 9,10-anthraquinone skeleton occurs in many dyes, such as alizarin. Important derivatives of 9,10-anthraquinone are 1-nitroanthraquinone, anthraquinone-1-sulfonic acid, and the dinitroanthraquinone.

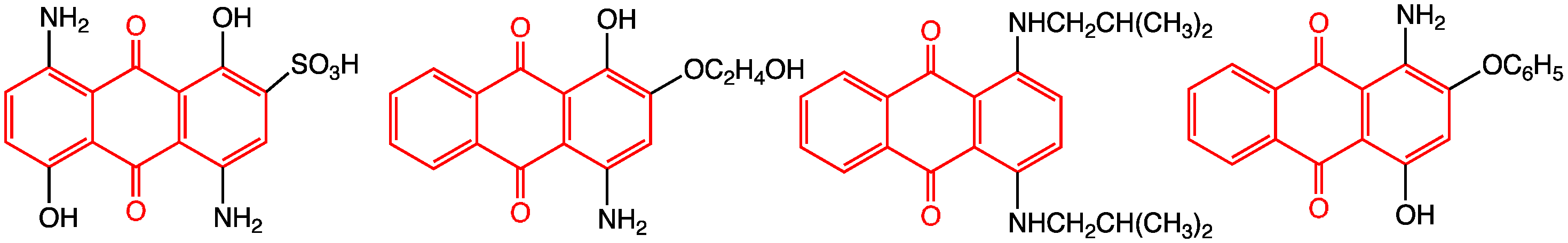
Selection of anthraquinone dyes. From the left: C.I.Acid Blue 43 an "acid dye" for wool (also called "Acilan Saphirol SE"), C.I. Vat Violet 1, which is applied by transfer printing using sublimation, a blue colorant commonly used in gasoline, and C.I. Disperse Red 60.

=== Medicine ===
Derivatives of 9,10-anthraquinone include drugs such as the anthracenediones and the anthracycline family of chemotherapy drugs. The latter drugs are derived from the bacterium Streptomyces peucetius, discovered in a soil sample near the Adriatic Sea. Drugs in the anthraquinone family include the prototypical daunorubicin, doxorubicin, mitoxantrone, losoxantrone, and pixantrone. Most of these drugs, with the notable exception of pixantrone, are extremely cardiotoxic, causing irreversible cardiomyopathy, which can limit their practical usefulness in cancer treatment.

The anthracenediones also include

- Antimalarials such as rufigallol
- DNA dyes / nuclear counterstains such as DRAQ5, DRAQ7 and CyTRAK Orange for flow cytometry and fluorescence microscopy.
- Anthraquinone derivatives: rhein, emodin, aloe emodin, parietin (physcion), and chrysophanol extracted from Cassia occidentalis are toxic and known to cause hepatomyoencephalopathy in children.

Aloe emodin

Daunorubicin

Mitoxantrone

Pixantrone

Dantron, emodin, and aloe emodin, and some of the senna glycosides have laxative effects. Prolonged use and abuse leads to melanosis coli.

=== Flow batteries ===
Soluble anthraquinones such as 9,10-anthraquinone-2,7-disulfonic acid are used as reactants in redox flow batteries, which provide electrical energy storage.
