= C14H7ClO2 =

The molecular formula C_{14}H_{7}ClO_{2} (molar mass: 242.66 g/mol) may refer to:

- Chloroanthraquinones
  - 1-Chloroanthraquinone
  - 2-Chloroanthraquinone
