= C14H9NO2 =

The molecular formula C_{14}H_{9}NO_{2} (molar mass: 223.231 g/mol) may refer to:

- Aminoanthraquinones
  - 1-Aminoanthraquinone
  - 2-Aminoanthraquinone
- Bentranil
