= C14H10O2 =

The molecular formula C_{14}H_{10}O_{2} (molar mass: 210.23 g/mol, exact mass: 210.0681 u) may refer to:

- Benzil
- 9,10-Dihydroxyanthracene
