= Anthraquinone-1-sulfonic acid =

Names
- Other names 1-Anthraquinonesulfonic acid, α-Anthraquinonesulfonic acid

Identifiers
CAS Number	82-49-5
3D model (JSmol)	Interactive image
ChemSpider	6457
ECHA InfoCard	100.001.298
EC Number	201-427-7
PubChem CID	6713
UNII	9FW580K11J
CompTox Dashboard (EPA)	DTXSID8058877
- InChI: InChI=1S/C14H8O5S/c15-13-8-4-1-2-5-9(8)14(16)12-10(13)6-3-7-11(12)20(17,18)19/h1-7H,(H,17,18,19) Key: JAJIPIAHCFBEPI-UHFFFAOYSA-N
- SMILES: C1=CC=C2C(=C1)C(=O)C3=C(C2=O)C(=CC=C3)S(=O)(=O)O

Properties
Chemical formula	C_{14}H_{8}O_{5}S
Molar mass	288.27 g·mol^{−1}
Appearance	yellow solid
Melting point	475–480 °C (887–896 °F; 748–753 K)
- Except where otherwise noted, data are given for materials in their standard state (at 25 °C [77 °F], 100 kPa). Infobox references

Anthraquinone-1-sulfonic acid is an organic compound with the formula C_{14}H_{7}O_{2}SO_{3}H. It is one of two of monosulfonated anthraquinone isomers. The compound is prepared by mercury-catalyzed reaction of anthraquinone with oleum. It undergoes chlorination (the Fischer reaction) to give 1-chloroanthraquinone. Its potassium salt is called "Diament salt".

The two isomers of anthraquinone monosulfonic acid

It is a precursor to several dyes.

== Analysis ==
The pervasive use of sulfonated dyes has led to the development of analytical methods.
