= Streptomyces spinoverrucosus =

Scientific classification
- Domain: Bacteria
- Kingdom: Bacillati
- Phylum: Actinomycetota
- Class: Actinomycetes
- Order: Streptomycetales
- Family: Streptomycetaceae
- Genus: Streptomyces
- Species: S. spinoverrucosus

Binomial name
- Streptomyces spinoverrucosus Diab and Al-Gounaim 1982

Type strain
- 163MA, ATCC 33692, Diab 163 MA, DSM 41648, IFO 14228, IFO 14250, JCM 5077, KCC S-1077, KCCS-1077, LMG 20321, MS, MS 1488, NBRC 14228, NBRC 14250, NCIB 11666, NCIMB 11666, NRRL B-16932

Species of bacterium

Streptomyces spinoverrucosus is a bacterium species from the genus of Streptomyces which has been isolated from air in Kuwait. Streptomyces spinoverrucosus produces salinazinone A, salinazinone B, galvaquinone A, galvaquinone B, galvaquinone C, spithioneine A, spithioneine B and anthraquinones.

== See also ==
- List of Streptomyces species
