= Fischer reaction =

In organic chemistry, the Fischer reaction is the conversion of an aryl sulfonic acid to an aryl chloride using chlorine:

ArSO_{3}H + Cl_{2} → ArCl + ClSO_{3}H

The method was once used extensively in the preparation of chlorinated anthraquinones such as 1-chloroanthraquinone and 2-anthraquinones. 1,5-Dichloroanthraquinone forms from the corresponding disulfonic acid. Illustrating some scope for this reaction, 1-chloroanthraquinone-2-carboxylic acid forms from the sulfonic-carboxylic acid.

Chlorine can be generated in situ from sodium chlorate and hydrochloric acid:

NaClO_{3} + 6 HCl → 3 Cl_{2} + NaCl + 3 H_{2}O

The acidity of this mixture means that sodium sulfonate salts can be used in situ, since they are readily protonated.
