= Hydroxylation of estradiol =

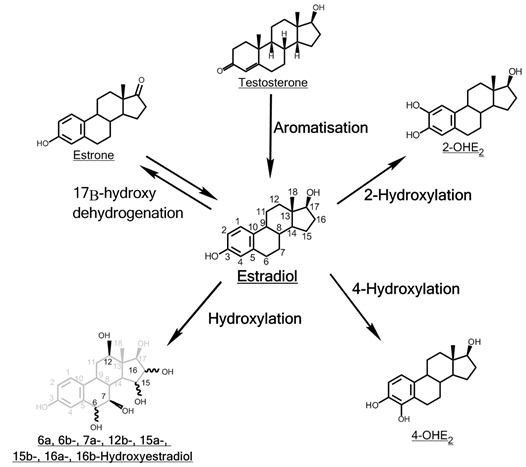
Major routes of metabolism of estradiol, showing hydroxylation.

The hydroxylation of estradiol is one of the major routes of metabolism of the estrogen steroid hormone estradiol. It is hydroxylated into the catechol estrogens 2-hydroxyestradiol and 4-hydroxyestradiol and into estriol (16α-hydroxyestradiol), reactions which are catalyzed by cytochrome P450 enzymes predominantly in the liver, but also in various other tissues.

== 2-Hydroxylation ==
Addition of a hydroxyl group at C2 represents the major hepatic pathway for estradiol metabolism, as mediated by CYP1A2, CYP2C8, CYP2C9, and CYP3A4. Extrahepatic 2-hydroxylation is chiefly mediated by CYP1A1 and CYP3A4.

2-Hydroxyestradiol (2-OHE_{2}) can experience three metabolic fates: methylation to yield 2-meOHE_{2}, oxidation to form quinones, or dehydrogenation to yield 2-OHE_{1}.

2-OHE_{2} can bind to estrogen receptors but with markedly lower affinity. This metabolite has several physiological consequences: the ability to influence intracellular signalling, adenohypophyseal hormone secretion, radical and quinone formation, and inhibition of tumor formation. Weak carcinogenic activity has been shown, likely due to radical formation and induction of single-strand DNA breaks.

Inactivation of 2-OHE_{2} is catalysed by catechol-O-methyltransferase (COMT), with COMT exhibiting a faster rate for the methylation of 2-OHE_{2} versus 4-OH-E_{2}. COMT, a blood-borne enzyme, mediates the most common form of 2- or 4-hydroxyestradiol inactivation, in addition to glucuronidation and sulfation. However, this inactivation can allow for the accumulation of 4-OHE_{2}, as 2-OHE_{2} inhibits 4-OHE_{2} methylation by COMT, but 4-OHE_{2} does not inhibit 2-OH-E_{2} methylation in return.

Antitumor activity of 2-meOE_{2} is thought to be mediated by antiproliferative and antimetastatic effects. Inhibition of cellular proliferation and metastasis appears to be via induction of caspase-8, followed by caspase-3 and eventually DNA fragmentation. Induction of apoptosis by 2-meOE_{2} may be p53 dependent or independent. 2-meOE_{2} has also been found to inhibit aromatase activity, thereby lowering the in situ synthesis of E_{2} in cancer tissue. 2-meOE_{2} has a higher binding affinity for sex hormone-binding globulin (SHBG) than E_{2} and 2-OH-E_{2} and has no affinity for the estrogen receptor.

2-meOE_{2} is also a potent inhibitor of angiogenesis in tumor tissues. Administration of this estradiol metabolite prevents vascular smooth muscle growth. This inhibition of angiogenesis is eliminated by co-administration with cytochrome P450 and COMT inhibitors, thereby confirming the involvement of cytochrome P450 enzymes in the blockade of tumor blood supply.

Further antitumor activity of 2-meOE_{2} has been identified through immunomodulation. The cytokines IL-6 and TNFα, as well the prostaglandin PGE_{2}, are capable of stimulating aromatase activity. Since macrophages and lymphocytes are present in breast tissue, this provides a concerning means of upregulating in situ estradiol biosynthesis. 2-meOE_{2} appeared to be able to halve the basal aromatase activity in mammary fibroblasts, possibly through destabilisation of the microtubules that mediate translocation of the cytokine receptors to the plasma membrane. Inhibition of cytokine receptor synthesis and blockade of the autocrine and paracrine actions of cytokines and PGE_{2} were also observed.

== 4-Hydroxylation ==
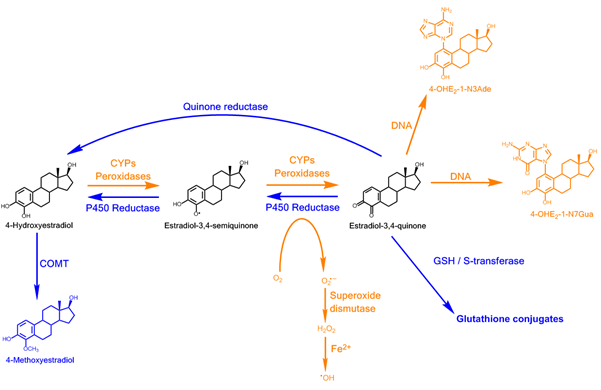
CYP-mediated metabolism of 4-OH-E_{2}. Carcinogenic changes are shown in orange. Protective changes are show in blue. Note that this scheme is identical to that for 2-OH-E_{2}, with the hydroxyl, methoxy and quinone groups occurring at C-2 instead of C-4.

The enzyme most responsible for estradiol 4-hydroxylation is CYP1B1. In humans, CYP1B1 mRNA and protein exhibit constitutive expression in the lung and kidney, as well as estrogen-regulated tissues such as breast, ovary and uterus. Whereas 4-hydroxylation constitutes the minor pathway in the liver, the greater proportion of CYP1B1 expression in extrahepatic tissues shifts the balance in favor of 4-OH-E_{2} formation. 4-OH-E_{2} is thought to be the most carcinogenic of all the estradiol metabolites, especially considering that CYP1B1 exhibits overexpression in breast cancer tumors.

4-OH-E_{2}, like 2-OH-E_{2}, can be physiologically active as well as tumorigenic. 4-OH-E_{2} is capable of binding ER with a reduced dissociation rate and prolonged activation, thereby inducing cellular growth and proliferation, adenohypophyseal hormone secretion, and prostaglandin production.

Das et al. implicated 4-OH-E_{2} in the induction of estrogen-responsive genes, a response that exhibited partial or no abrogation by coadministration with an antiestrogen, providing evidence for the ability of 4-OH-E_{2} to carry out genetic upregulation via a pathway independent of ER signalling. Effects independent of ER binding include breakage of single-stranded DNA, especially when interacting synergistically with nitric oxide in human breast cancer cells and the production of quinones and free radicals.

CYP1B1 can be induced by E_{2}. ERα, after binding to estradiol, interacts with the CYP1B1 ERE to stimulate CYP1B1 expression. Thus, although E_{2} causes genetic changes conducive to its own inactivation, the decrease in estrogenic activity yields a toxicologically active metabolite that constitutes an additional pathway of estradiol-dependent carcinogenesis.

4-OH-E_{2} shares the metabolic scheme of 2-OH-E_{2}: methylation to 4-methoxyestradiol (4-meOE_{2}), oxidation to quinones, or dehydrogenation to 4-OH-E_{1}. Conjugation by the ubiquitously present COMT represents the most common extrahepatic pathway of 4-OH-E_{2} inactivation. However, if estrogen homeostasis is imbalanced by an increase in CYP1B1 and a decrease in COMT, a greater degree of genotoxic quinone formation from 4-OH-E_{2} will occur. 4-OHE_{2} can be oxidized by microsomal CYPs or peroxidases to yield estradiol-3,4-semiquinone. This semiquinone can undergo redox cycling with oxygen to form estradiol-3,4-quinone (E_{2}-3,4-Q) and superoxide. E_{2}-3,4-Q can be converted back to 4-OHE_{2} in a single step by quinone reductase, or in two sequential steps catalysed by P450 reductase via the semiquinone intermediate. GSH / S-transferase activity can abrogate E_{2}-3,4-Q levels via formation of glutathione conjugates.

E_{2}-3,4-Q is a potent nucleophile, and will readily react with electrophilic DNA. This yields the formation of the DNA adducts 4-OHE_{2}-1-N7Gua and 4-OHE_{2}-1-N3Ade via a Michael addition. Destabilization of the glycosyl bond between the nitrogenous base and ribose sugar creates apurinic sites as the unstable adducts are lost from DNA. 4-OHE_{2}-1-N7Gua has a relatively slow depurination half-life of approx. 3 hours, allowing enough time for base excision repair mechanisms to correct the change. However, 4-OHE_{2}-1-N3Ade exhibits instantaneous depurination, leading to error-prone repair and the induction of mutations. Indeed, E_{2}-3,4-Q has been shown to cause A-to-G mutations in the gene coding for H¬-ras, ras being vital to the correct regulation of the cellular response to growth factors. Though 2- and 4-OHE_{2} have similar redox potentials and thus similar redox cycling activity, the greater carcinogenic capacity of 4-OHE_{2} can be attributed to its increased reactivity with DNA. Another harmful effect of estrogen redox cycling is the production of superoxide and hydroxyl radicals. P450 reductase catalysis produces superoxide radicals, which can, in the presence of superoxide dismutase and Fe^{3+}, form highly reactive hydroxyl radicals capable of damaging virtually all macromolecules.

== 16α-Hydroxylation ==
Through the action of CYP1A1, CYP1A2, CYP2C8, and the CYP3A isoforms, 16α-hydroxyestradiol (16α-OHE_{2}), also known as estriol, is produced in abundance during pregnancy. 16α-OHE_{2} can be dehydrogenated to 16α-hydroxyestrone (16α-OHE_{1}), a metabolite that has been shown to bind covalently to the estrogen receptor via Schiff base formation. This covalent linkage occurs between the steroid carbonyl and the ε-amino group of lysine. In theory, 16α-OHE_{1} could also bind DNA, although this has not been observed. 16α-OHE_{2} is a potent ER agonist, capable of levels of cellular proliferation stimulation that near those obtained with E_{2}. Though studies in hamster kidney tumor models showed weak carcinogenicity, the carcinogenic potential of 16α-OHE_{2} in humans remains unknown.

== Other hydroxylations ==
The function of the remainder of the hydroxylated E_{2} metabolites (6α-, 6β-, 7α-, 12β-, 15α-, 15β-, and 16β-OHE_{2}) remain to be elucidated. Some of these metabolites, such as 15α-OHE_{2}, are excreted in relatively large amounts in pregnant women, possibly serving as an indicator of good fetal health.
