= 9,10-Dihydroxyanthracene =

Names
- Preferred IUPAC name Anthracene-9,10-diol

Identifiers
CAS Number	4981-66-2
3D model (JSmol)	Interactive image
ChemSpider	19827
KEGG	C16206
PubChem CID	21082
UNII	ETK5C5EZG6
CompTox Dashboard (EPA)	DTXSID4063664
- InChI: InChI=1S/C14H10O2/c15-13-9-5-1-2-6-10(9)14(16)12-8-4-3-7-11(12)13/h1-8,15-16H Key: PCFMUWBCZZUMRX-UHFFFAOYSA-N; InChI=1/C14H10O2/c15-13-9-5-1-2-6-10(9)14(16)12-8-4-3-7-11(12)13/h1-8,15-16H Key: PCFMUWBCZZUMRX-UHFFFAOYAS
- SMILES: Oc2c1c(cccc1)c(O)c3c2cccc3

Properties
Chemical formula	C_{14}H_{10}O_{2}
Molar mass	210.232 g·mol^{−1}
- Except where otherwise noted, data are given for materials in their standard state (at 25 °C [77 °F], 100 kPa). verify (what is ?) Infobox references

9,10-Dihydroxyanthracene is an organic compound with the formula C_{14}H_{10}O_{2}. It is the hydroquinone form of 9,10-anthraquinone (AQ). It formed when AQ is hydrogenated. It is easily dissolved in alkaline solutions and is often called soluble anthraquinone (SAQ).

In the anthraquinone process, hydrogen peroxide is manufactured as one of the products in the oxygen-mediated oxidation of a substituted 9,10-dihydroxyanthracene to its corresponding anthraquinone, such as 2-ethylanthraquinone.

== See also ==
- Sodium 2-anthraquinonesulfonate, a water-soluble anthraquinone derivative
