= C20H24N2 =

The molecular formula C_{20}H_{24}N_{2} (molar mass: 292.42 g/mol, exact mass: 292.1939 u) may refer to:

- Dimetindene
- Enprazepine
- Glyoxal-bis(mesitylimine)
