= Chloroanthraquinone =

Chloroanthraquinone may refer to:

- 1-Chloroanthraquinone
- 2-Chloroanthraquinone
