= Aloe emodin =

Chemical compound

Clinical data
- Other names: Rhabarberone
- Routes of administration: Oral
- ATC code: None

Identifiers
- IUPAC name: 1,8-Dihydroxy-3-(hydroxymethyl)-9,10-anthracenedione
- CAS Number: 481-72-1
- PubChem CID: 10207
- ChemSpider: 9792
- UNII: C8IYT9CR7C
- KEGG: C10294
- ChEBI: CHEBI:2607
- ChEMBL: ChEMBL40275
- CompTox Dashboard (EPA): DTXSID2030695
- ECHA InfoCard: 100.006.884

Chemical and physical data
- Formula: C_{15}H_{10}O_{5}
- Molar mass: 270.240 g·mol^{−1}
- 3D model (JSmol): Interactive image
- Melting point: 223 to 224 °C (433 to 435 °F) Sublimes in CO_{2} stream
- SMILES: O=C2c1cccc(O)c1C(=O)c3c2cc(cc3O)CO
- InChI: InChI=1S/C15H10O5/c16-6-7-4-9-13(11(18)5-7)15(20)12-8(14(9)19)2-1-3-10(12)17/h1-5,16-18H,6H2; Key:YDQWDHRMZQUTBA-UHFFFAOYSA-N

Aloe emodin (1,8-dihydroxy-3-(hydroxymethyl)anthraquinone) is an anthraquinone and an isomer of emodin present in aloe latex, an exudate from the aloe plant. It has a strong stimulant-laxative action. Aloe emodin is not carcinogenic when applied to the skin, although it may increase the carcinogenicity of some kinds of radiation.

Aloe emodin is found in the gel, sap or leaves of aloe vera, the socotrine aloe, and Zanzibar aloes, the bark of Frangula (Rhamnus frangula) and cascara sagrada (Rhamnus purshiana), the leaves of Senna (Cassia angustifolia), and the rhizome of rhubarb (Rheum rhaponticum). Aloe-emodin has not been found in Natal aloes.

== See also ==
- Emodin
