= Acute HME syndrome =

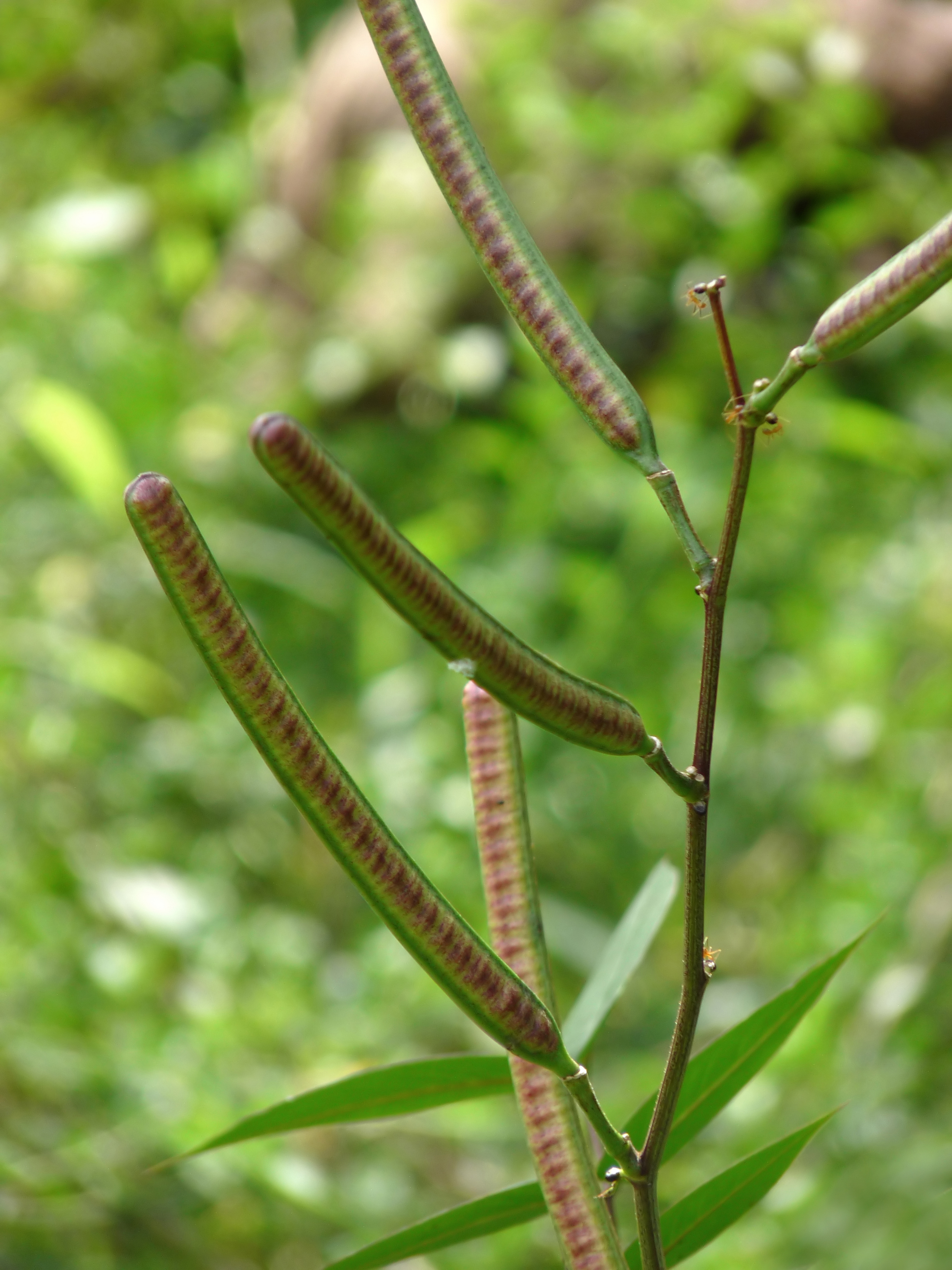
- Ripe pods of Cassia occidentalis plant

Acute hepatomyoencephalopathy (HME) syndrome is the name given to a multi-system disease affecting the liver, muscle and brain which is now known to be caused by phytotoxins. After extensive investigation the culprit has been found to be the beans of a common herb in India, Cassia occidentalis. In many districts of western Uttar Pradesh, Uttarakhand, Odisha and Haryana, India, outbreaks of an acute "encephalopathy" syndrome, dubbed as a "mysterious disease", have been an annual feature for many years. At least 500-700 young previously healthy children had been losing their lives every year in this region. The disease affected rural young children during the winter months of September to December, with fatality rates around 75-80%. It was first assumed it to be a kind of viral encephalitis. Many national investigating agencies failed to diagnose the entity for many years.

== Mechanism ==
The acute severe C. occidentalis poisoning in children affects multiple systems. Functional and biochemical evidences to show toxic effect on the brain, liver and striated muscles. Pathologically there is acute onset massive zonal necrosis of liver and histopathology evidence of acute muscle fibre degeneration. The degenerative changes in the brain are mild, but brain oedema is severe and is believed to be the immediate cause of death.

A team of researchers from IITR, Lucknow, conducted detailed animal and toxicological studies to conclusively demonstrate that the toxin involved in these outbreaks was present in the pods (seeds) of the Cassia occidentalis weed [8-12]. GC-MS analysis of various fractions of methanol extracts from Cassia occidentalis seeds revealed the presence of five anthraquinones (AQs): physcion, emodin, rhein, aloe-emodin, and chrysophanol. Interestingly, these AQs were detected in serum and urine samples from the affected cases and Cassia occidentalis-exposed rats. Cytotoxicity testing of these AQs in rat primary hepatocytes and HepG2 cells showed that rhein is the most toxic compound, followed by emodin, aloe-emodin, physcion, and chrysophanol. It was also demonstrated that 100 nM cyclosporine A was the most effective among various protective agents at preventing apoptosis in hepatocytes [13].

== Treatment ==
No specific treatment is available as yet. Treatment is mainly symptomatic, may require intensive care management but the outcome is uniformly poor and unpredictable if a full-blown picture of acute HME has appeared.

== History ==
A team of investigators led by a local pediatrician Dr Vipin Mohan Vashishtha investigated this epidemic in Bijnor district, one of the affected districts of western Uttar Pradesh, and published their findings as three papers in national peer-reviewed journals. A six-member panel led by virologist Dr Jacob John from Vellore's Christian Medical College & Hospital was constituted by the Odisha state government to investigate the deaths of approximately 100 children in Malkangiri district since September 2015. The deaths were suspected to have occurred due to Japanese encephalitis. In its interim report, the panel indicated that anthraquinone, a toxin found in the 'bada chakunda' plant (Cassia occidentalis), was identified in the urine of five deceased children, indicating that some of them might have died of encephalopathy caused by consumption of the plant. After four years, it was concluded that the disease was not encephalitis but a fatal multi-system disease affecting liver, muscle and brain, called "acute hepatomyoencephalopathy (HME) syndrome" and induced by a phytotoxin.

=== Criticism of the Cassia occidentalis poisoning theory ===
Local tribals in Malkangiri have argued that chakunda seeds have been eaten by local tribes for a very long time and never found to be lethal. The tribal people also use the root, seeds and leaf of the plant as a traditional medicine for many common ailments. This is a possible reason why chakunda seeds have been used to adulterate pulses which are sold to tribal people by unscrupulous traders.
