= 2-Aminoanthraquinone =

Identifiers
CAS Number	17-79-3
3D model (JSmol)	Interactive image
ChEBI	CHEBI:34258
ChEMBL	ChEMBL84685
ChemSpider	8038
ECHA InfoCard	100.003.827
EC Number	204-208-4
KEGG	C14444
PubChem CID	8341
UNII	65Z03V2Z09
CompTox Dashboard (EPA)	DTXSID6020068
- InChI: InChI=1S/C14H9NO2/c15-8-5-6-11-12(7-8)14(17)10-4-2-1-3-9(10)13(11)16/h1-7H,15H2 Key: XOGPDSATLSAZEK-UHFFFAOYSA-N
- SMILES: C1=CC=C2C(=C1)C(=O)C3=C(C2=O)C=C(C=C3)N

Properties
Chemical formula	C_{14}H_{9}NO_{2}
Molar mass	223.231 g·mol^{−1}
Appearance	white solid
Melting point	302–303 °C (576–577 °F; 575–576 K)

Hazards
- GHS labelling
Pictograms	(GHS08: Health hazard)
Signal word	Warning
Hazard statements	H351
Precautionary statements	P203, P280, P318, P405, P501
- Except where otherwise noted, data are given for materials in their standard state (at 25 °C [77 °F], 100 kPa). Infobox references

2-Aminoanthraquinone is an organic compound with the formula C_{14}H_{9}O_{2}N. It is one of two of monoaminoanthraquinone isomers. The compound is prepared from 2-chloroanthraquinone by treatment with ammonia. A number of other routes have been described, e.g. using nitrobenzene in the diacylation.

The compound exhibits extensive reactivity, e.g. diazotization.

It is a precursor to indanthrone, a commercial blue dye.

== Safety ==
Like many aromatic amines, the potential carcinogenicity of 2-aminoanthraquinone has been scrutinized.
