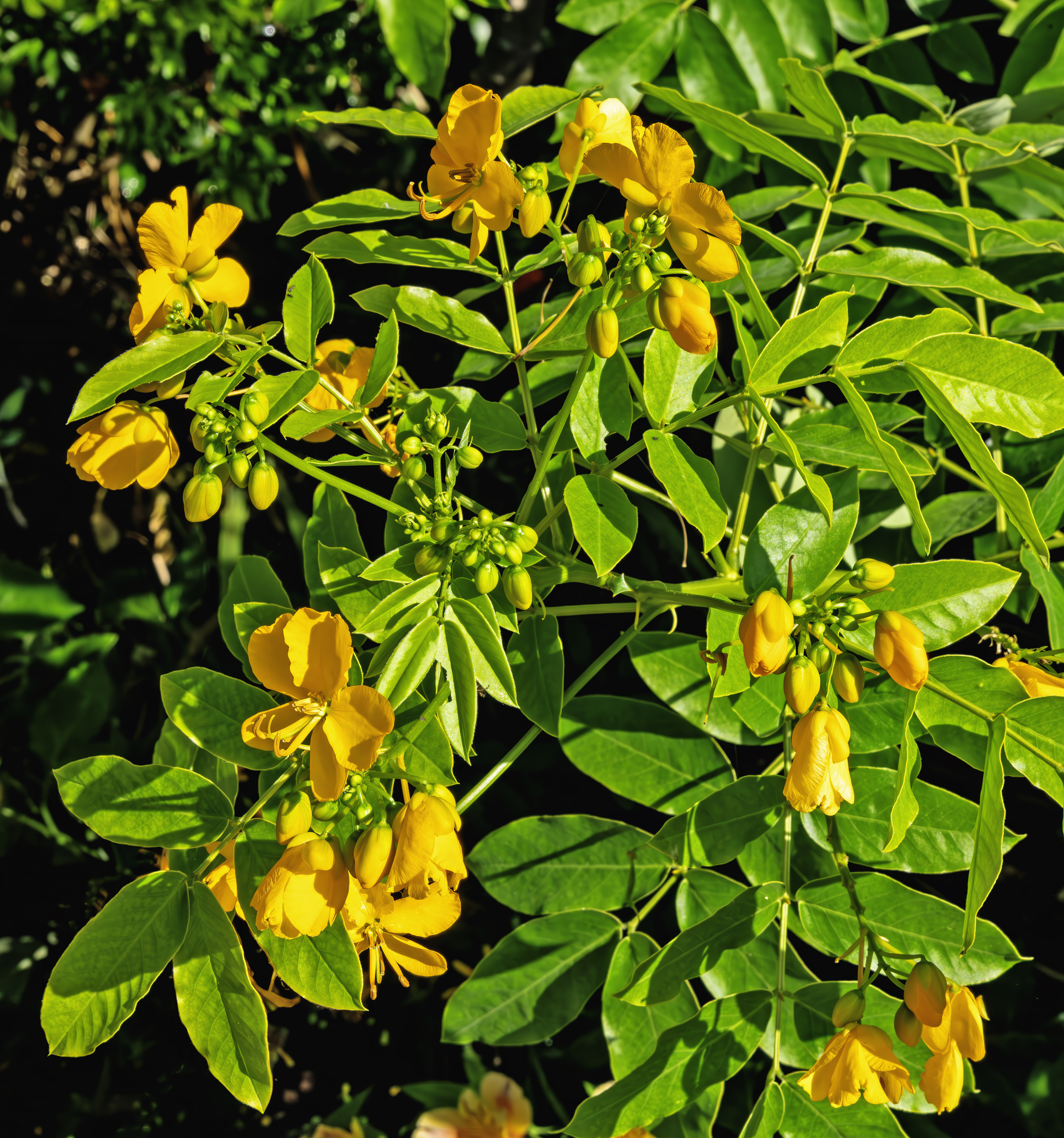
- Habit

Conservation status
- Least Concern (IUCN 3.1)

Scientific classification
- Kingdom: Plantae
- Clade: Tracheophytes
- Clade: Angiosperms
- Clade: Eudicots
- Clade: Rosids
- Order: Fabales
- Family: Fabaceae
- Subfamily: Caesalpinioideae
- Genus: Senna
- Species: S. occidentalis

Binomial name
- Senna occidentalis (L.) Link

Synonyms
- List: Cassia occidentalis L.; Ditremexa occidentalis (L.) Britton & Rose; Cassia caroliniana Walter; Cassia ciliata Raf.; Cassia falcata L.); Cassia foetida Willemet nom. illeg.; Cassia glaucescens Hoffmanns.; Cassia macradenia Collad.; Cassia obliquifolia Schrank; Cassia occidentalis var. aristata Collad.; Cassia occidentalis var. glabra Vogel nom. illeg.; Cassia papulosa Hoffmanns.; Cassia planisiliqua L.; Cassia plumieri DC.; Diallobus falcatus (L.) Raf.; Ditremexa caroliniana (Walter) Raf.; Ditremexa fetida Raf.; Psilorhegma planisiliqua (L.) Britton & Rose; Senna andhrica P.V.Ramana, J.Swamy & M.Ahmed.; Senna occidentalis var. andhrica (P.V.Ramana, J.Swamy & M.Ahmed.) K.W.Jiang; Senna orientalis Walp.

= Senna occidentalis =

Species of plant

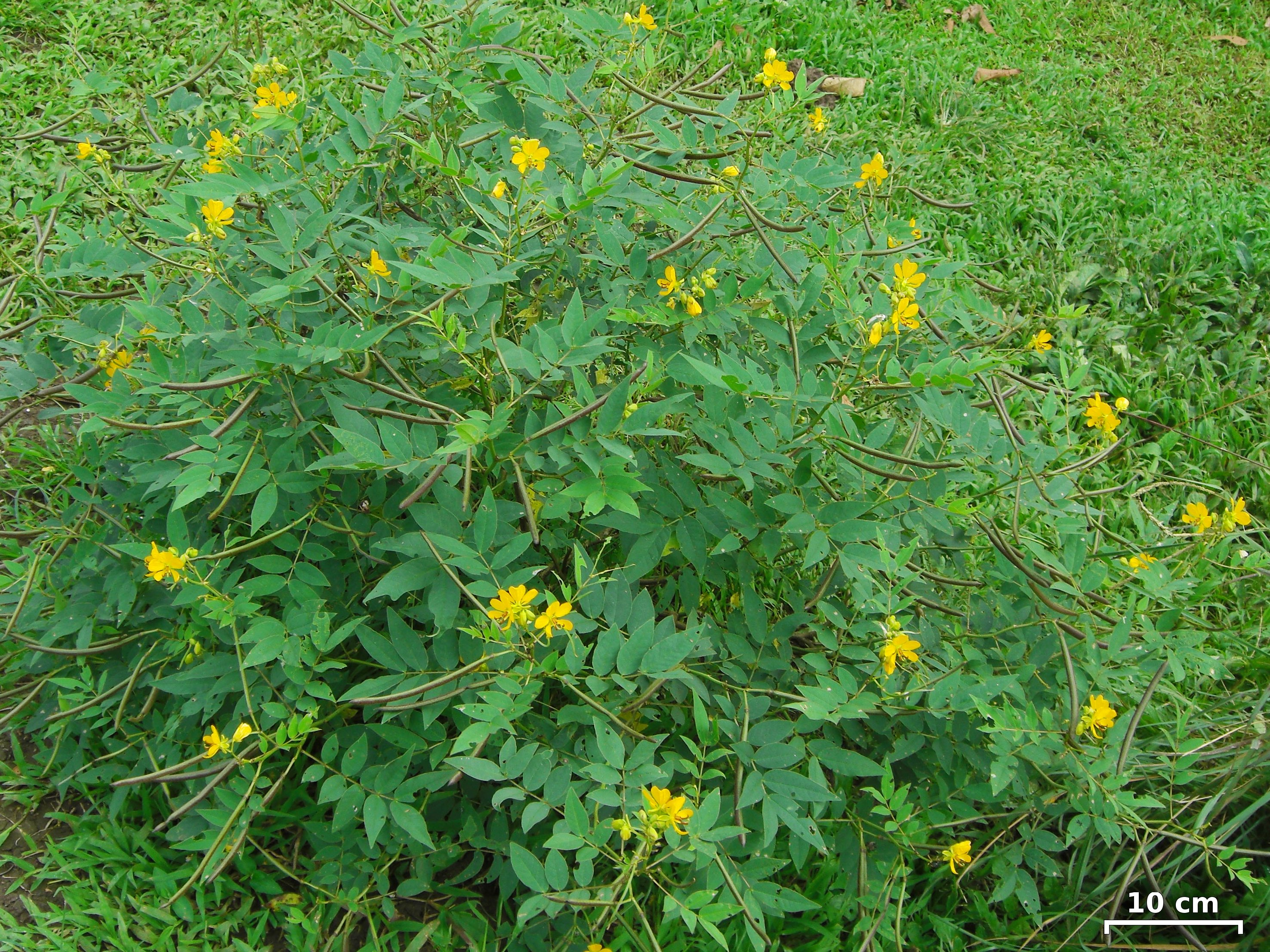
Habit in the Galápagos Islands

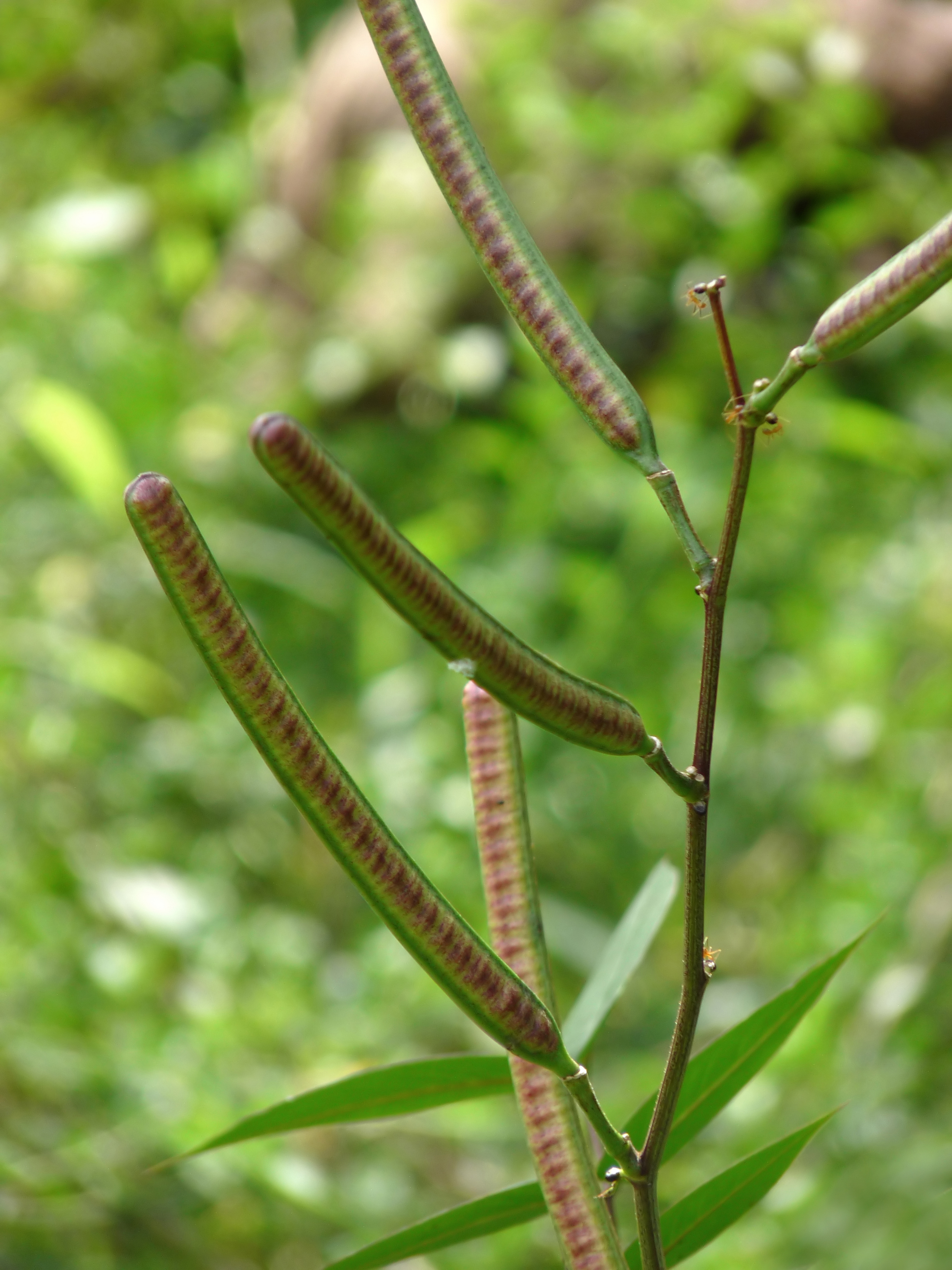
Pods

Senna occidentalis, commonly known as coffee senna, styptic weed, or septicweed, is a species of flowering plant in the family Fabaceae and is native to the southern United States of America, Mexico and South America. It is a shrub with pinnate leaves, with three to seven pairs of broadly elliptic to egg-shaped leaflets, and yellow flowers arranged in groups of two to four, with six fertile stamens in each flower. It is an aggressive, pantropical weed.

== Description ==
Senna occidentalis is a foetid shrub that typically grows to a height of 1–2 m (3 ft 3 in – 6 ft 7 in) and has softly-hairy branches and stems. Its leaves are pinnate, 150–170 mm (5.9–6.7 in) long on a petiole 20–40 mm (0.79–1.57 in) long, with three to seven pairs of broadly elliptic to egg-shaped leaflets 50–70 mm (2.0–2.8 in) long and 30–40 mm (1.2–1.6 in) wide, spaced 15–30 mm (0.59–1.18 in) apart. There is a sessile glands near the base of the petiole.

The flowers are yellow and arranged on the ends of branchlets and in upper leaf axils in groups of two to four on a peduncle 2–5 mm (0.079–0.197 in) long, each flower on a pedicel 10–15 mm (0.39–0.59 in) long. The petals are up to 10 mm (0.39 in) long and there are six fertile stamens, the anthers varying in length from 4 to 6 mm (0.16 to 0.24 in) long, and four staminodes. Flowering occurs all year, and the fruit is a cylindrical pod 120–180 mm (4.7–7.1 in) long, about 3 mm (0.12 in) wide and slightly curved.

== Taxonomy ==
This species was first formally described in 1753 by Carl Linnaeus who gave it the name Cassia occidentalis in Species Plantarum from specimens collected in Jamaica. In 1829, Link transferred the species to the genus Senna as S. occidentalis in his Handbuch zur Erkennung der nutzbarsten und am häufigsten vorkommenden Gewachse. The specific epithet (occidentalis) means "western".

== Distribution and habitat ==
Coffee senna is native to the southern United States of America, Mexico and South America, but is an aggressive, pantropical weed. In Australia it is widespread but scattered in the north of Western Australia, the Northern Territory, South Australia, Queensland and New South Wales.

== Toxicity ==
Senna occidentalis seeds contain anthraquinones (AQs) such as Rhein, Emodin, Aloe-emodin, Chrysophanol, and Physcion, which have been linked to hepatomyoencephalopathy in children. The cytotoxicity of these AQs correlates with their binding affinity to serum albumin, with Rhein showing the highest toxicity and binding affinity. The plant is reported to be poisonous to cattle, because it contains a known toxic derivative of anthraquinone called emodin, and the seeds contain chrysarobin (1,8-dihydroxy-3-methyl-9-anthrone) and N-methylmorpholine. The plant also has some poisonous characteristics to humans if enough of it is taken. Emodin and Aloe-emodin exhibited strong binding affinities to DNA, which is associated with their high cytotoxic potential. Rhein was found to oxidize glutathione (GSH) significantly, contributing to its toxic effects, while Physcion and Chrysophanol showed minimal interactions with DNA, correlating with their lower toxicity. This suggests that the toxicity of AQs from the seeds is significantly influenced by their interaction with proteins and DNA, leading to adverse health effects.

Despite the claims of being poisonous, the leaves of this plant, Dhiguthiyara in the Maldivian language, have been used in the diet of the Maldives for centuries in dishes such as mas huni and also as a medicinal plant.

Almost all parts (leaf, root, seeds) of the plant are used as food and medicine by tribal populations in India. However, consumption of Bana Chakunda seeds has been identified as a possible cause of death of tribal children due to acute Encephalopathy (see Acute HME syndrome). Once the plant was identified as the cause, the number of deaths plummeted.

The same thing happened in Rio Grande do Sul, Brazil, where 16 outbreaks were recorded. This was a record in comparison to the clinical study of 1979, at which eight calves died after contracting dyspnea, neutrophilia and tachycardia from consumption of the plant.
