= Pitrazepin =

Chemical compound

Clinical data
- Pregnancy category: ?
- Routes of administration: ?
- ATC code: none

Legal status
- Legal status: In general: uncontrolled

Identifiers
- IUPAC name: 3-(piperazin-1-yl)-9H-dibenzo[c,f][1,2,4]triazolo[4,3-a]azepine
- CAS Number: 90685-01-1
- PubChem CID: 146222
- ChemSpider: 128982
- UNII: 4KHA9U8INV
- CompTox Dashboard (EPA): DTXSID90238239

Chemical and physical data
- Formula: C_{19}H_{19}N_{5}
- Molar mass: 317.396 g·mol^{−1}
- 3D model (JSmol): Interactive image
- SMILES: n4nc(N1CCNCC1)n5c2ccccc2Cc3ccccc3c45

Pitrazepin is a competitive GABA_{A} and glycine receptor antagonist. It has been used to study insect and snail nervous systems in scientific research.

CNS Rev:

== See also ==
- Bicuculline
- Strychnine
