= Propazepine =

Names
- Preferred IUPAC name 3-(6,11-Dihydro-5H-dibenzo[b,e]azepin-5-yl)-N,N-dimethylpropan-1-amine
- Other names Prazepine, Proazepine

Identifiers
CAS Number	73-07-4
3D model (JSmol)	Interactive image
ChEMBL	ChEMBL2105257
ChemSpider	264414
PubChem CID	299322
UNII	72O4809PU1
CompTox Dashboard (EPA)	DTXSID00223272
- InChI: InChI=1S/C19H24N2/c1-20(2)12-7-13-21-15-18-10-4-3-8-16(18)14-17-9-5-6-11-19(17)21/h3-6,8-11H,7,12-15H2,1-2H3 Key: UKCVXGBHVGMFCN-UHFFFAOYSA-N
- SMILES: CN(C)CCCN1CC2=CC=CC=C2CC3=CC=CC=C31

Properties
Chemical formula	C_{19}H_{24}N_{2}
Molar mass	280.415 g·mol^{−1}
- Except where otherwise noted, data are given for materials in their standard state (at 25 °C [77 °F], 100 kPa). Infobox references

Propazepine is a tricyclic antidepressant (TCA). Propazepine is sometimes confused with imipramine, which has the central ring nitrogen in a different location. Prazepine is the International nonproprietary name of this compound. Prazepine is also reported to be one of the many synonyms of imipramine. Propazepine can be synthesized chemically. Propazepine appears to never have actually been used as a tricyclic antidepressant outside of initial medical tests; therefore, there is little information about it.
