= Bentranil =

Weed control herbicide

Names
- Preferred IUPAC name 2-Phenyl-4H-3,1-benzoxazin-4-one
- Other names: Linarotox; H-170

Identifiers
CAS Number	1022-46-4
3D model (JSmol)	Interactive image
ChEBI	CHEBI:145402
ChEMBL	ChEMBL24449
ChemSpider	13324
ECHA InfoCard	100.149.861
EC Number	620-965-7
PubChem CID	13926
UNII	F6R7D8UJO5
CompTox Dashboard (EPA)	DTXSID60144732
- InChI: InChI=1S/C14H9NO2/c16-14-11-8-4-5-9-12(11)15-13(17-14)10-6-2-1-3-7-10/h1-9H Key: HTTLBYITFHMYFK-UHFFFAOYSA-N
- SMILES: C1=CC=C(C=C1)C2=NC3=CC=CC=C3C(=O)O2

Properties
Chemical formula	C_{14}H_{9}NO_{2}
Molar mass	223.231 g·mol^{−1}
Appearance	White to almost white solid
Density	1.1814
Melting point	124 °C (255 °F; 397 K)
Boiling point	192 °C (378 °F; 465 K)
Solubility in water	5.5 mg/L
Solubility in toluene	Soluble

Hazards
- GHS labelling
Pictograms	(GHS07: Exclamation mark)
Signal word	Warning
Hazard statements	H315, H319, H335
Precautionary statements	P261, P264, P264+P265, P271, P280, P302+P352, P304+P340, P305+P351+P338, P319, P321, P332+P317, P337+P317, P362+P364, P403+P233, P405, P501
- Except where otherwise noted, data are given for materials in their standard state (at 25 °C [77 °F], 100 kPa). Infobox references

Bentranil is a postemergent herbicide used to control annual weeds in cereal crops, maize, and rice. 11,000 pounds (5,000 kg) of bentranil was used in the US in 1974. Bentranil has excellent selectivity on germinaceous crops, potatoes and soybeans, but was never commercialised due to the high doses needed to control broadleaf weeds.

Bentranil is synthesised from 2-iodobenzoic acid and benzonitrile.

== Medical potential ==
Bentranil derivates show promise as highly selective Cytochrome P450 inhibitors, which is desirable to prevent and treat cancer, as P450 is highly expressed in tumours and is implicated to drug resistance.

== Derivatives ==
Fluorobentranil (bentranil that has undergone fluorine substitution) showed good broad-leaf activity and selectivity on rice, cereals and maize. The 5-fluoro derivative showed triple the standard herbicidal activity. The fluorine's electronegativity strengthens binding to enzymes.

Chemical structure of fluorobentranil
