= Sodium 2-anthraquinonesulfonate =

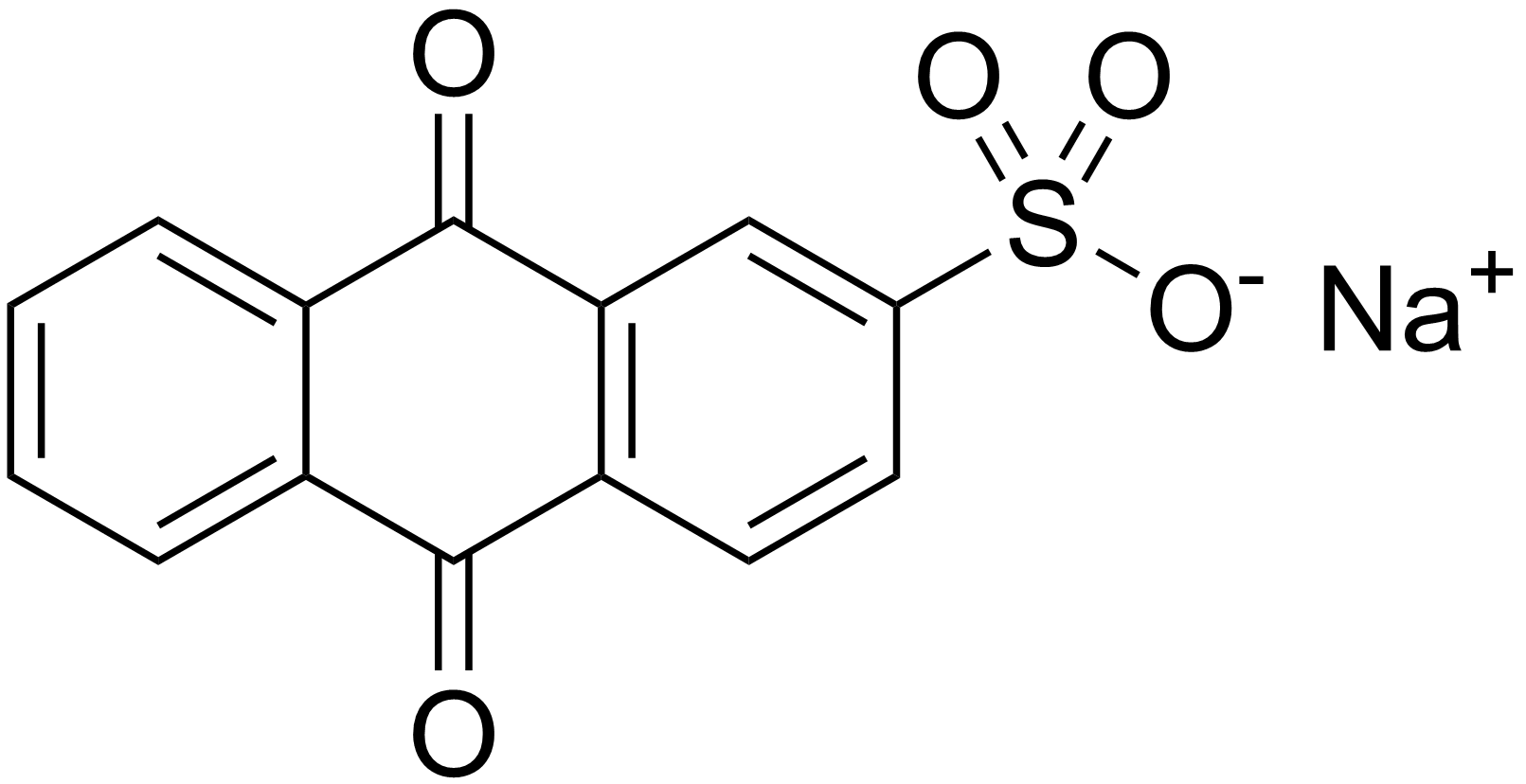

Names
- Preferred IUPAC name Sodium 9,10-dioxo-9,10-dihydroanthracene-2-sulfonate
- Other names Sodium 2-anthrachinonesulphonate; 2-Anthraquinone sodium sulfonate; Silver salt

Identifiers
CAS Number	131-08-8
3D model (JSmol)	Interactive image
ChemSpider	8080408
ECHA InfoCard	100.004.555
PubChem CID	9904754
UNII	511H72SDVX
CompTox Dashboard (EPA)	DTXSID4044535
- InChI: InChI=1S/C14H8O5S.Na/c15-13-9-3-1-2-4-10(9)14(16)12-7-8(20(17,18)19)5-6-11(12)13;/h1-7H,(H,17,18,19);/q;+1/p-1 Key: GGCZERPQGJTIQP-UHFFFAOYSA-M
- SMILES: O=C1C2=C(C=CC(S(=O)([O-])=O)=C2)C(C3=CC=CC=C31)=O.[Na+]

Properties
Chemical formula	C_{14}H_{7}NaO_{5}S
Molar mass	310.25 g·mol^{−1}
- Except where otherwise noted, data are given for materials in their standard state (at 25 °C [77 °F], 100 kPa). verify (what is ?) Infobox references

Sodium 2-anthraquinonesulfonate (AMS) is a water-soluble anthraquinone derivative. In the laboratory it can be prepared by sulfonation of anthraquinone.

== Digester additive in papermaking ==
AMS is used as a catalyst in the production of alkaline pulping in the soda process. It goes through a redox cycle similar to that of anthraquinone to give a catalytic effect. AMS was discovered as an efficient pulping catalyst before anthraquinone, but has a higher cost.
