= CYP1B1 =

Protein-coding gene in humans

Identifiers
- Aliases: CYP1B1, CP1B, CYPIB1, GLC3A, P4501B1, cytochrome P450 family 1 subfamily B member 1, ASGD6
- External IDs: OMIM: 601771; MGI: 88590; GeneCards: CYP1B1
Available structures
| PDB | Ortholog search: PDBe RCSB |
| PDB | List of PDB id codes 3PM0 |
Enzyme activity
| EC # | BRENDA | ExPASy | KEGG | MetaCyc |
|---|---|---|---|---|
| 1.14.14.1 | ↗ | ↗ | ↗ | ↗ |
| 4.2.1.152 | ↗ | ↗ | ↗ | ↗ |

Gene location (Human)
| Chr. | Chromosome 2 (human) |
| Band | 2p22.2 | Start | 38,066,973 bp |
| Band | 2p22.2 | End | 38,109,902 bp |

Gene location (Mouse)
| Chr. | Chromosome 17 (mouse) |
| Band | 17|17 E3 | Start | 80,008,966 bp |
| Band | 17|17 E3 | End | 80,022,490 bp |
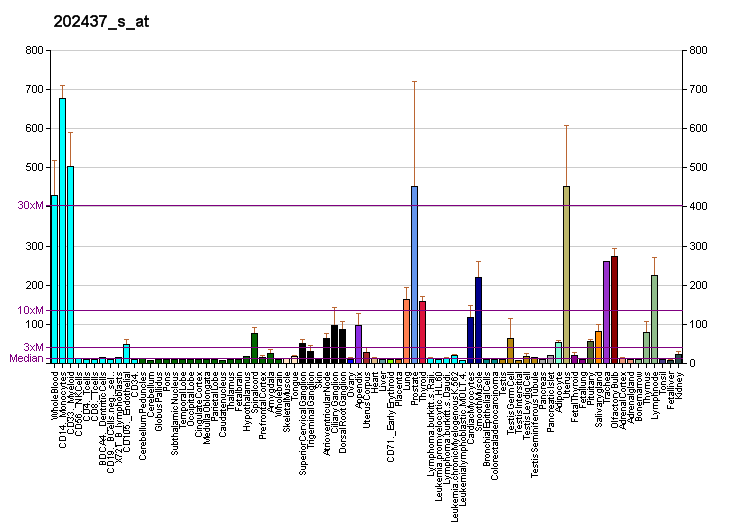

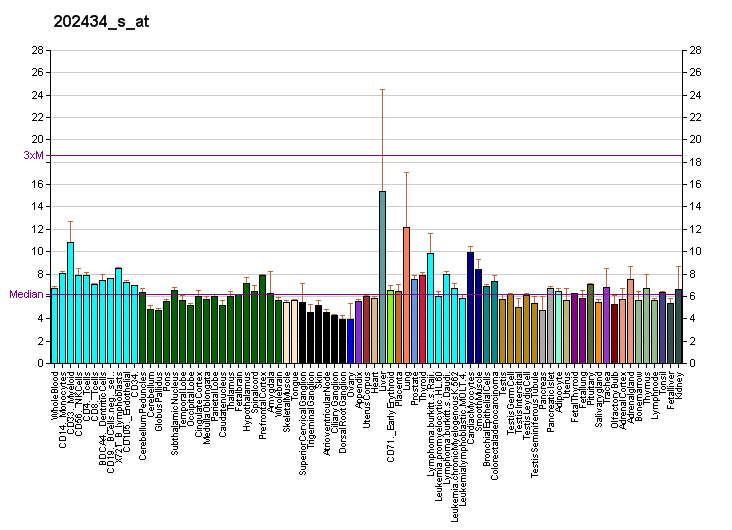

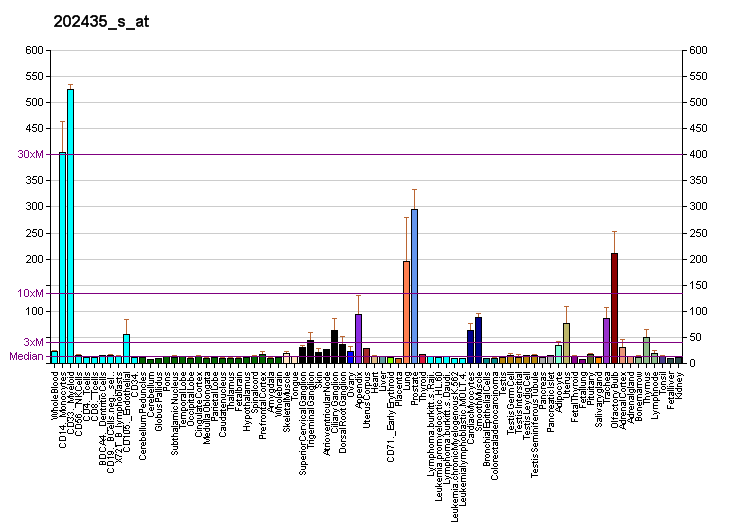
RNA expression pattern
| Bgee | Human / Mouse (ortholog); Top expressed in: pericardium; cartilage tissue; synovial joint; trigeminal ganglion; spinal ganglia; synovial membrane; tendon of biceps brachii; superficial temporal artery; hair follicle; urethra / Top expressed in: stroma of bone marrow; vestibular membrane of cochlear duct; renal corpuscle; cumulus cell; ciliary body; lactiferous gland; mesenteric lymph nodes; vas deferens; ankle joint; tunica media of zone of aorta; More reference expression data |
| BioGPS | More reference expression data |
Gene ontology
| Molecular function | iron ion binding; oxygen binding; metal ion binding; heme binding; oxidoreductase activity, acting on paired donors, with incorporation or reduction of molecular oxygen; oxidoreductase activity; aromatase activity; oxidoreductase activity, acting on paired donors, with incorporation or reduction of molecular oxygen, reduced flavin or flavoprotein as one donor, and incorporation of one atom of oxygen; monooxygenase activity |
| Cellular component | organelle membrane; endoplasmic reticulum membrane; intracellular membrane-bounded organelle; membrane; endoplasmic reticulum; mitochondrion |
| Biological process | toxin metabolic process; steroid metabolic process; retina vasculature development in camera-type eye; cellular response to organic cyclic compound; epoxygenase P450 pathway; endothelial cell-cell adhesion; omega-hydroxylase P450 pathway; angiogenesis; cellular aromatic compound metabolic process; sterol metabolic process; response to toxic substance; visual perception; blood vessel morphogenesis; trabecular meshwork development; negative regulation of NF-kappaB transcription factor activity; regulation of reactive oxygen species metabolic process; retinal metabolic process; endothelial cell migration; nitric oxide biosynthetic process; retinol metabolic process; cell adhesion; negative regulation of cell population proliferation; positive regulation of apoptotic process; positive regulation of receptor signaling pathway via JAK-STAT; negative regulation of cell adhesion mediated by integrin; xenobiotic metabolic process; cellular response to hydrogen peroxide; membrane lipid catabolic process; retinal blood vessel morphogenesis; positive regulation of angiogenesis; positive regulation of vascular endothelial growth factor production; intrinsic apoptotic signaling pathway in response to oxidative stress; arachidonic acid metabolic process; negative regulation of cell migration; estrogen metabolic process; collagen fibril organization |
Sources:Amigo / QuickGO
Orthologs
| Databases | NCBI: entry; OMA: entry |
| Species | Human | Mouse |
| Entrez | 1545 | 13078 |
| Ensembl | ENSG00000138061 | ENSMUSG00000024087 |
| UniProt | Q16678 | Q64429 |
| RefSeq (mRNA) | NM_000104 | NM_009994; NM_001364889 |
| RefSeq (protein) | NP_000095 | NP_034124; NP_001351818 |
| Location (UCSC) | Chr 2: 38.07 – 38.11 Mb | Chr 17: 80.01 – 80.02 Mb |
| PubMed search |
- Wikidata
| View/Edit Human | View/Edit Mouse |

Cytochrome P450 1B1 is an enzyme that in humans is encoded by the CYP1B1 gene.

== Function ==
CYP1B1 belongs to the cytochrome P450 superfamily of enzymes. The cytochrome P450 proteins are monooxygenases which catalyze many reactions involved in drug metabolism and synthesis of cholesterol, steroids, and other lipids. The enzyme encoded by this gene localizes to the endoplasmic reticulum (ER) and metabolizes procarcinogens such as polycyclic aromatic hydrocarbons and 17beta-estradiol.

Despite over 20 years of research on CYP1A1 and CYP1A2, CYP1B1 was not identified and sequenced until 1994. Nucleic and amino acid analysis showed approximately 40% identity with CYP1A1. Despite this similarity, these two enzymes have very different catalytic efficiencies and metabolites when incubated with common substrates, such as retinoic acid and arachidonic acid. Recently CYP1B1 has been shown to be physiologically important in fetal development, since mutations in CYP1B1 are linked with a form of primary congenital glaucoma.

CYP1A1 and CYP1B1 are regulated by the aryl hydrocarbon receptor, a ligand activated transcription factor. They are part of the Phase I reactions of drug metabolism.

== Clinical significance ==
Mutations in this gene have been associated with primary congenital glaucoma; therefore it is thought that the enzyme also metabolizes a signaling molecule involved in eye development, possibly a steroid.

P450 is highly expressed in tumours and implicated in drug resistance, and is a research target to combat cancer. Developed inhibitors include flavonoids, trans-stilbenes, quinazolines, and derivatives of bentranil, a herbicide.
