= Enprazepine =

Chemical compound

Clinical data
- ATC code: None

Identifiers
- IUPAC name: N,N-dimethyl-3-(11-methylidene-6,11-dihydro-5H-dibenzo[b,e]azepin-5-yl)propan-1-amine
- CAS Number: 47206-15-5
- PubChem CID: 208922
- ChemSpider: 181018
- UNII: L2H26JSV0I
- ChEMBL: ChEMBL2106212
- CompTox Dashboard (EPA): DTXSID00866128

Chemical and physical data
- Formula: C_{20}H_{24}N_{2}
- Molar mass: 292.426 g·mol^{−1}
- 3D model (JSmol): Interactive image
- SMILES: c3cc2c(/C(c1c(cccc1)CN2CCCN(C)C)=C)cc3

Enprazepine is a tricyclic antidepressant (TCA) that was never marketed.

== See also ==
- Tricyclic antidepressant
