= 2-Ethylanthraquinone =

Intermediate Chemical in H2O2 Synthesis

- Structural formula of 2-Ethylanthraquinone

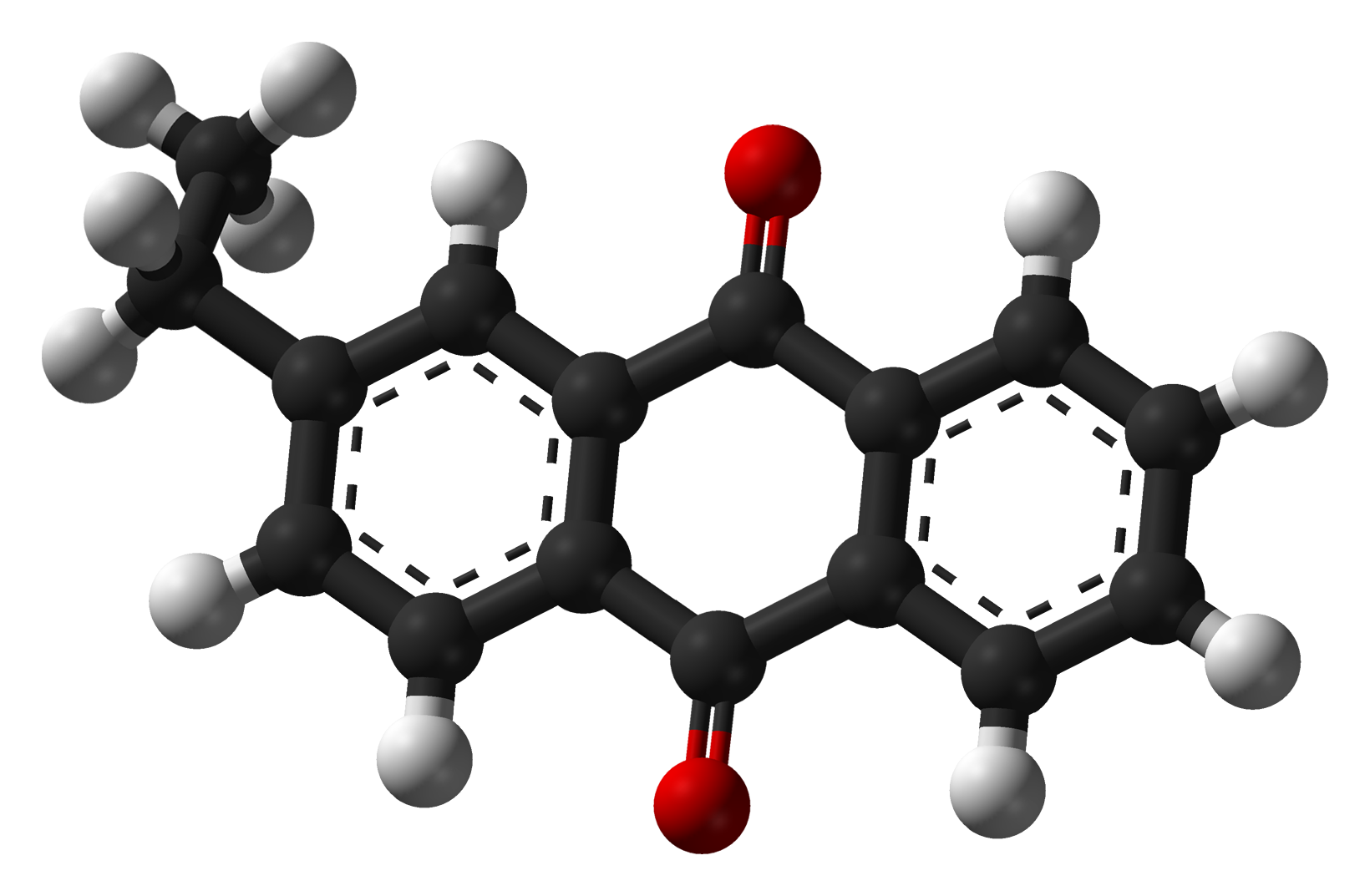
- Ball-and-stick model

Names
- Preferred IUPAC name 2-Ethylanthracene-9,10-dione
- Other names 2-Ethyl-9,10-anthracenedione

Identifiers
CAS Number	84-51-5
3D model (JSmol)	Interactive image
ChEMBL	ChEMBL42355
ChemSpider	6514
ECHA InfoCard	100.001.396
EC Number	201-535-4
PubChem CID	6772
UNII	59YJ81QZKD
CompTox Dashboard (EPA)	DTXSID5044994
- InChI: InChI=1S/C16H12O2/c1-2-10-7-8-13-14(9-10)16(18)12-6-4-3-5-11(12)15(13)17/h3-9H,2H2,1H3 Key: SJEBAWHUJDUKQK-UHFFFAOYSA-N; InChI=1/C16H12O2/c1-2-10-7-8-13-14(9-10)16(18)12-6-4-3-5-11(12)15(13)17/h3-9H,2H2,1H3 Key: SJEBAWHUJDUKQK-UHFFFAOYAW
- SMILES: O=C2c1c(cccc1)C(=O)c3c2ccc(c3)CC

Properties
Chemical formula	C_{16}H_{12}O_{2}
Molar mass	236.27 g/mol
Appearance	white to yellowish crystals or powder
Density	1.231g/cm3
Melting point	105 °C (221 °F; 378 K)
Boiling point	415.4 @ 760mmHg

Hazards
- GHS labelling
Pictograms	(GHS08: Health hazard) (GHS09: Environmental hazard)
Signal word	Danger
Hazard statements	H350, H373, H410
Precautionary statements	P201, P202, P260, P273, P281, P308+P313, P314, P391, P405, P501
Flash point	155.4 °C (311.7 °F; 428.5 K)
- Except where otherwise noted, data are given for materials in their standard state (at 25 °C [77 °F], 100 kPa). verify (what is ?) Infobox references

2-Ethylanthraquinone is an organic compound that is a derivative of anthraquinone. This pale yellow solid is used in the industrial production of hydrogen peroxide (H_{2}O_{2}).

== Production ==
2-Ethylanthraquinone is prepared from the reaction of phthalic anhydride and ethylbenzene:

C_{6}H_{4}(CO)_{2}O + C_{6}H_{5}Et → C_{6}H_{4}(CO)_{2}C_{6}H_{3}Et + H_{2}O.

Both phthalic anhydride and ethylbenzene are readily available, being otherwise used in the large-scale production of plastics.

== Uses ==
Hydrogen peroxide is produced industrially by the anthraquinone process which involves using 2-alkyl-9,10-anthraquinones for hydrogenation. Many derivatives of anthraquinone are used but 2-ethylanthraquinone is common because of its high selectivity. The hydrogenation of the unsubstituted ring can reach 90% selectivity by using 2-ethylanthraquinone. Hydrogenation follows the Riedl-Pfleiderer, or autoxidation, process:

The Riedl-Pfleiderer process.

The hydrogenation of 2-ethylanthraquinone is catalyzed by palladium. Hydrogenation produces both 2-ethylanthrahydroquinone and tetrahydroanthraquinone. The tetrahydro derivative of 2-alkylanthraquinone is easily hydrogenated but is more difficult to oxidize. The formation of the tetrahydro derivative can be suppressed through the selection of catalysts, solvents, and reaction conditions. Some suggested solvent mixtures are polyalkylated benzenes and alkyl phosphates or tetraalkyl ureas, trimethylbenzenes and alkylcyclohexanol esters, and methylnaphthalene and nonyl alcohols.
