= 1-Chloroanthraquinone =

Names
- Other names α-chloroanthraquinone, 1-Chloro-9,10-anthracenedione

Identifiers
CAS Number	82-44-0
3D model (JSmol)	Interactive image
ChEMBL	ChEMBL3560876
ChemSpider	6453
ECHA InfoCard	100.001.293
EC Number	201-421-4
PubChem CID	6709
UNII	96S5SQV15V
CompTox Dashboard (EPA)	DTXSID7052571
- InChI: InChI=1S/C14H7ClO2/c15-11-7-3-6-10-12(11)14(17)9-5-2-1-4-8(9)13(10)16/h1-7H Key: BOCJQSFSGAZAPQ-UHFFFAOYSA-N
- SMILES: C1=CC=C2C(=C1)C(=O)C3=C(C2=O)C(=CC=C3)Cl

Properties
Chemical formula	C_{14}H_{7}ClO_{2}
Molar mass	242.66 g·mol^{−1}
Appearance	yellow solid
Melting point	162 °C (324 °F; 435 K)

Hazards
- GHS labelling
Pictograms	(GHS07: Exclamation mark)
Signal word	Warning
Hazard statements	H315, H319, H335
Precautionary statements	P261, P264, P264+P265, P271, P280, P302+P352, P304+P340, P305+P351+P338, P319, P321, P332+P317, P337+P317, P362+P364, P403+P233, P405, P501
- Except where otherwise noted, data are given for materials in their standard state (at 25 °C [77 °F], 100 kPa). Infobox references

1-Chloroanthraquinone is an organic compound with the formula C_{14}H_{7}O_{2}Cl. It is one of two of monochlorinated anthraquinone isomers. The compound is prepared by direct chlorination of anthraquinone. It can also be prepared by chlorination of anthraquinone-1-sulfonic acid, sometimes called the Fischer reaction.

Heating 1-chloroanthraquinone with benzamide gives 1-benzoylaminoanthraquinone.
