= Anthraquinone process =

Process for the production of hydrogen peroxide

The anthraquinone process, also called the Riedl–Pfleiderer process, is a process for the production of hydrogen peroxide, which was developed by IG Farben in the 1940s. The industrial production of hydrogen peroxide is based on the reduction of oxygen, as in the direct synthesis from the elements. Instead of hydrogen itself, however, a 2-alkyl-anthrahydroquinone, which is generated before from the corresponding 2-alkyl-anthraquinone by catalytic hydrogenation with palladium is used. Oxygen and the organic phase react under formation of the anthraquinone and hydrogen peroxide. Among other alkyl groups (R) ethyl- and tert-butyl- are used, e.g., 2-ethylanthraquinone.

The hydrogen peroxide is then extracted with water and in a second step separated by fractional distillation from the water. The hydrogen peroxide accumulates as sump product. The anthraquinone acts as a catalyst, the overall reaction equation is therefore:

H_{2} + O_{2} → H_{2}O_{2}

If ozone is used instead of oxygen, dihydrogen trioxide can be produced by this method.
