= Anthraquinone =

Yellow chemical compound: building block of many dyes

9,10-Anthraquinone

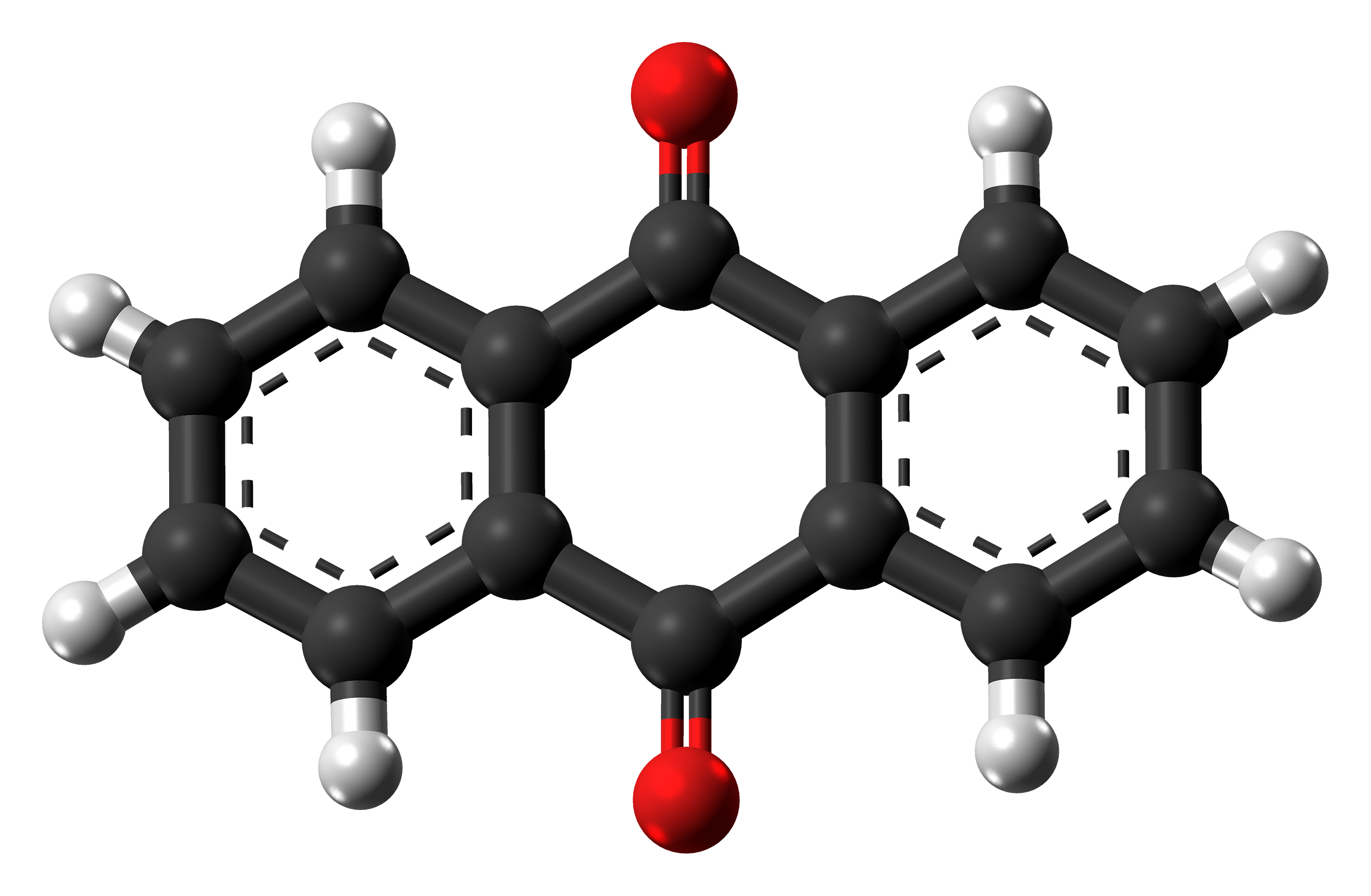

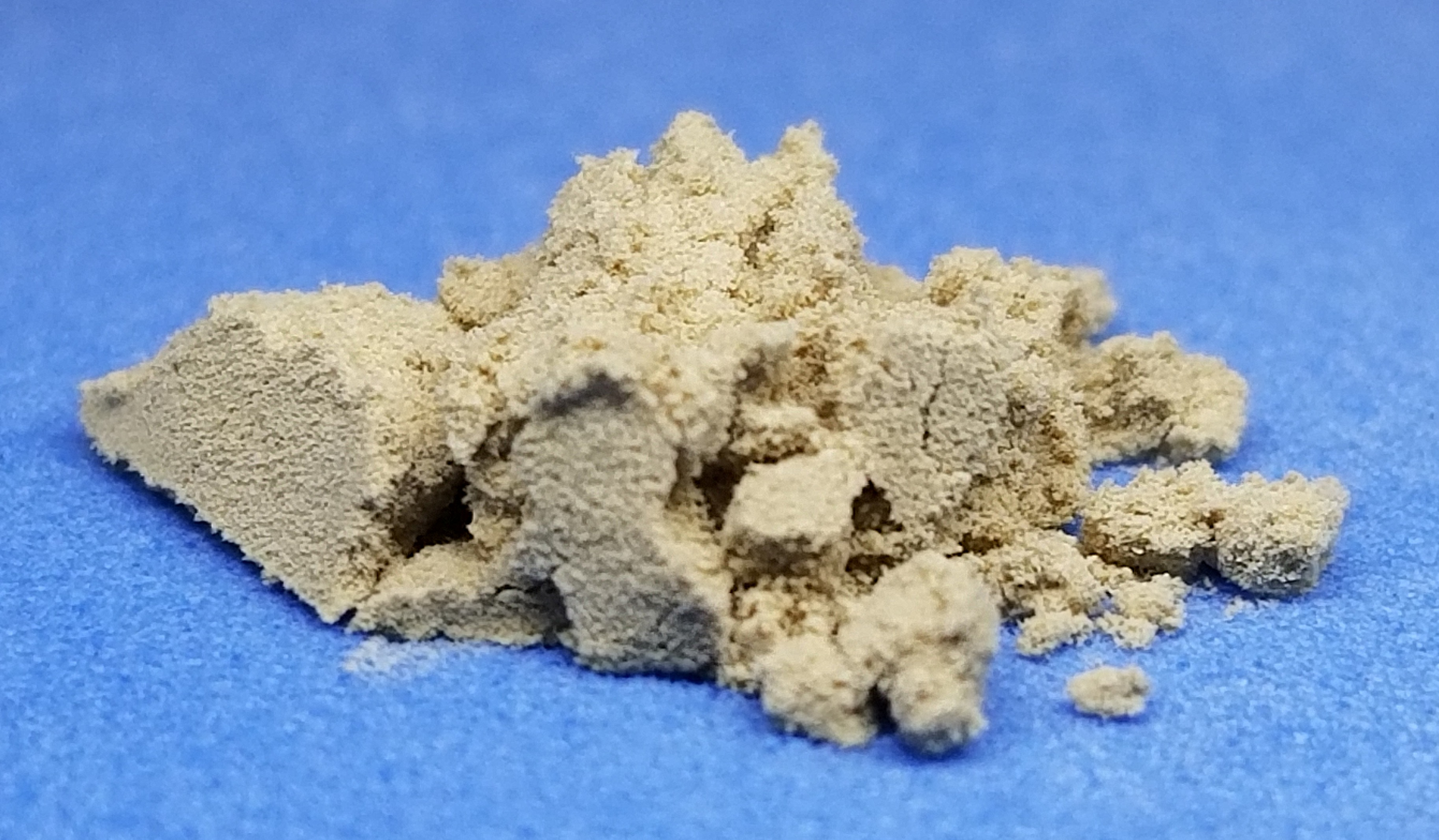

Names
- Preferred IUPAC name Anthracene-9,10-dione
- Other names: Anthraquinone; 9,10-Anthracenedione; Anthradione; 9,10-Anthrachinon; Anthracene-9,10-quinone; 9,10-Dihydro-9,10-dioxoanthracene; Hoelite; Morkit; Corbit

Identifiers
CAS Number	84-65-1
3D model (JSmol)	Interactive image
Beilstein Reference	390030
ChEBI	CHEBI:40448
ChEMBL	ChEMBL55659
ChemSpider	6522
ECHA InfoCard	100.001.408
EC Number	201-549-0
Gmelin Reference	102870
KEGG	C16207
PubChem CID	6780
RTECS number	CB4725000
UNII	030MS0JBDO
UN number	3143
CompTox Dashboard (EPA)	DTXSID3020095
- InChI: InChI=1S/C14H8O2/c15-13-9-5-1-2-6-10(9)14(16)12-8-4-3-7-11(12)13/h1-8H Key: RZVHIXYEVGDQDX-UHFFFAOYSA-N
- SMILES: O=C1c2ccccc2C(=O)c3ccccc13

Properties
Chemical formula	C_{14}H_{8}O_{2}
Molar mass	208.216 g·mol^{−1}
Appearance	Yellow solid
Density	1.438 g/cm^{3}
Melting point	284.8 °C (544.6 °F; 558.0 K)
Boiling point	377 °C (711 °F; 650 K)
Solubility in water	Insoluble

Hazards
- Occupational safety and health (OHS/OSH)
Main hazards	possible carcinogen
- GHS labelling
Pictograms	(GHS08: Health hazard)
Signal word	Danger
Hazard statements	H350
Precautionary statements	P201, P202, P281, P308+P313, P405, P501
Flash point	185 °C (365 °F; 458 K)

Related compounds
Related compounds	quinone, anthracene
- Except where otherwise noted, data are given for materials in their standard state (at 25 °C [77 °F], 100 kPa). verify (what is ?) Infobox references

Anthraquinone, also called anthracenedione or dioxoanthracene, is an aromatic organic compound with formula C_{14}H_{8}O_{2}. Several isomers exist but these terms usually refer to 9,10-anthraquinone (IUPAC: 9,10-dioxoanthracene) wherein the keto groups are located on the central ring. It is used as a digester additive to wood pulp for papermaking. Many anthraquinone derivatives are generated by organisms or synthesised industrially for use as dyes, pharmaceuticals, and catalysts. Anthraquinone is a yellow, highly crystalline solid, poorly soluble in water but soluble in hot organic solvents. It is almost completely insoluble in ethanol near room temperature but 2.25 g will dissolve in 100 g of boiling ethanol. It is found in nature as the rare mineral hoelite.

== Synthesis ==
There are several current industrial methods to produce 9,10-anthraquinone:

1. The oxidation of anthracene. Chromium(VI) is the typical oxidant.
2. The Friedel–Crafts reaction of benzene and phthalic anhydride in presence of AlCl_{3}. o-Benzoylbenzoic acid is an intermediate. This reaction is useful for producing substituted anthraquinones.
3. The Diels-Alder reaction of naphthoquinone and butadiene followed by oxidative dehydrogenation.
4. The acid-catalyzed dimerization of styrene to give a 1,3-diphenylbutene, which then can be transformed to the anthraquinone. This process was pioneered by BASF.

It also arises via the Rickert–Alder reaction, a retro-Diels–Alder reaction.

== Reactions ==
Hydrogenation gives dihydroanthraquinone (anthrahydroquinone). Reduction with copper gives anthrone. Sulfonation with oleum gives anthroquinone-1-sulfonic acid, which reacts with sodium chlorate to give 1-chloroanthraquinone.

== Applications ==
Anthraquinone itself has few direct applications except as a precursor to some dyes. It has been used as a bird repellant on seeds, and as a gas generator in satellite balloons. It has also been mixed with lanolin and used as a wool spray to protect sheep flocks against kea attacks in New Zealand. Anthraquinone is utilized in the production of hydrogen peroxide via the Riedl–Pfleiderer process. Anthraquinone derivatives are considered more useful.

Anthraquinone has application in the synthesis of danitracen.

The Schmidt reaction on anthraquinone gives the lactam, 5H-Dibenz[b,e]azepine-6,11-dione [1143-50-6]. The relevance of this is that it has application in the synthesis of prazepine, enprazepine, epinastine, pitrazepin, perlapine, elantrine, BRN 0492972 [971-97-1] & BRN 0489793 [69352-71-2].

== Other isomers ==
Several other isomers of anthraquinone exist, including the 1,2-, 1,4-, and 2,6-anthraquinones. They are of minor importance compared to 9,10-anthraquinone.

== Safety ==
Anthraquinone has no recorded LD_{50}, probably because it is so insoluble in water.

In terms of metabolism of substituted anthraquinones, the enzyme encoded by the gene UGT1A8 has glucuronidase activity with many substrates including anthraquinones.

== See also ==
- Benzoquinone
- Naphthoquinone
- Parietin
- 2-Ethylanthraquinone
