= 2-Chloroanthraquinone =

Names
- Other names β-chloroanthraquinone, 2-Chloro-9,10-anthracenedione

Identifiers
CAS Number	131-09-9
3D model (JSmol)	Interactive image
ChEMBL	ChEMBL3186676
ChemSpider	8235
ECHA InfoCard	100.004.556
EC Number	205-010-0
PubChem CID	8553
UNII	5ZD4DU5A9G
CompTox Dashboard (EPA)	DTXSID7049213
- InChI: InChI=1S/C14H7ClO2/c15-8-5-6-11-12(7-8)14(17)10-4-2-1-3-9(10)13(11)16/h1-7H Key: FPKCTSIVDAWGFA-UHFFFAOYSA-N
- SMILES: C1=CC=C2C(=C1)C(=O)C3=C(C2=O)C=C(C=C3)Cl

Properties
Chemical formula	C_{14}H_{7}ClO_{2}
Molar mass	242.66 g·mol^{−1}
Appearance	yellow solid
Melting point	210 °C (410 °F; 483 K)

Hazards
- GHS labelling
Pictograms	(GHS07: Exclamation mark)
Signal word	Warning
Hazard statements	H315, H319, H335
Precautionary statements	P261, P262, P264, P264+P265, P270, P271, P273, P280, P301+P317, P302+P352, P304+P340, P305+P351+P338, P316, P317, P319, P321, P330, P332+P317, P337+P317, P361+P364, P362+P364, P391, P403+P233, P405, P501
- Except where otherwise noted, data are given for materials in their standard state (at 25 °C [77 °F], 100 kPa). Infobox references

2-Chloroanthraquinone is an organic compound with the formula C_{14}H_{7}O_{2}Cl. It is one of two of monochlorinated anthraquinone isomers. The compound is prepared by diacylation of chlorobenzene with phthalic anhydride, a standard route to anthraquinones. Heating 2-chloroanthraquinone under pressure with ammonia gives 2-aminoanthraquinone, which in turn is a precursor to indanthrone, a commercial blue dye.
